= Glossary of economics =

This glossary of economics is a list of definitions containing terms and concepts used in economics, its sub-disciplines, and related fields.

== A ==
absolute advantage

The ability of a party (whether an individual, firm, or country) to produce a greater quantity of a good, product, or service than competitors using the same amount of resources.
absorption
The total demand for all final marketed goods and services by all economic agents resident in an economy, regardless of the origin of the goods and services themselves
abandonment of the gold standard
The decision by a government to abandon a monetary system in which the standard economic unit of account is based on a fixed quantity of gold.
accelerator effect
A positive effect on private fixed investment because of the growth of the market economy. Rising GDP usually implies that profit expectations and business confidence rise, encouraging businesses to build more factories and other buildings and to install more machinery.
adaptive expectations
A hypothetical process by which people form expectations about what will happen in the future based on what has happened in the past.
AD–AS model
A macroeconomic model that explains price level and output through the relationship of downward-sloping aggregate demand (AD) and upward-sloping aggregate supply (AS).
AD–IA model
A macroeconomic model that explains inflation and output through the relationship of downward-sloping aggregate demand (AD) and horizontal inflation adjustment (IA). The monetary policy rule (MPR) is assumed, which is that the central bank increases interest rates in response to increase in inflation and vice versa.
adverse selection
A market situation where buyers and sellers have different information, and participants with key information participate selectively in trades at the expense of other parties.
advertising elasticity of demand (AED)

Measures the sensitivity of a good's demand to a change in advertising.
agflation

An increase in the price of food and industrial agricultural crops when compared to the general rise in prices.
aggregate demand (AD)

The total demand for goods and services in an economy. It specifies the amounts of goods and services that will be purchased at all possible price levels. Aggregate demand can also be interpreted as the demand for the gross domestic product of a country. It is often called effective demand, though this term also has a distinct meaning.
aggregate supply (AS)

The total supply of goods and services in an economy.
aggregation problem
The difficult problem of finding a valid way to treat an empirical or theoretical aggregate as if it reacted like a less-aggregated measure, say, about behavior of an individual agent as described in general microeconomic theory.
agent
An actor or, more specifically, a decision maker in a model of some aspect of the economy.
agricultural economics
An applied field of economics concerned with the application of economic theory in optimizing the production and distribution of food.
AK model
A macroeconomic model that explains output through the relationship of total factor productivity and capital. It assumes that there is no diminishing return of capital.
Alchian–Allen effect

When the prices of two substitute goods, such as high and low grades of the same product, are both increased by a fixed per-unit amount, consumption will shift toward the higher-grade product. This is because the added per-unit amount decreases the relative price of the higher-grade product.
Allais paradox
A choice problem showing an inconsistency of actual observed choices with the independence axiom of expected utility theory.
allocative efficiency
A state of the economy in which production represents consumer preferences; in particular, every good or service is produced up to the point where the last unit provides a marginal benefit to consumers equal to the marginal cost of producing. In the single-price model, at the point of allocative efficiency, price is equal to marginal cost.
alternative minimum tax (AMT)
A tax imposed by the U.S. federal government in addition to the regular income tax for certain individuals, estates, and trusts. High-income taxpayers must calculate and pay the greater of the AMT or regular tax.
ambiguity aversion

Any preference for known risks over unknown risks.
American school

A school of thought based around industry protection, government investment in infrastructure, and a national bank.
Amoroso–Robinson relation
An equation that describes the relation between price, marginal revenue, and price elasticity of demand.
ancient economic thought
The economic ideas proposed by ancient thinkers, in the history of economic thought.
Anglo-Saxon model
A school of thought based around low levels of regulation and taxation, minimal public services, strong private property rights, contract enforcement, overall ease of doing business, and low barriers to free trade.
annual effective discount rate (AER)
The amount of interest paid or earned as a percentage of the balance at the end of the annual period.
anti-rival good
The opposite of a rival good. The more people share an anti-rival good, the more utility each person receives.
antitrust law

Any law that promotes or seeks to maintain market competition by regulating anti-competitive conduct by companies. Competition law is implemented through public and private enforcement. It is also known as "antitrust law" in the United States for historical reasons and as "anti-monopoly law" in China and Russia.
applied economics
The application of economic theory and econometrics in specific settings. As one of the two sets of fields of economics (the other being the core), it is typically characterized by the application of the core, i.e. economic theory and econometrics, to address practical issues in a range of fields.
appropriate technology
A movement (and its manifestations) encompassing technological choice and application that is small-scale, decentralized, labor-intensive, energy-efficient, environmentally sound, and locally autonomous.
arbitrage
The practice of taking advantage of a price difference between two or more markets by striking a combination of matching deals that capitalize upon the imbalance, with the profit being the difference between the market prices.
Arrow–Debreu model

A model that suggests there must be a set of prices such that aggregate supplies will equal aggregate demands for every commodity in the economy, given certain assumptions. It can be used to prove the existence of general equilibrium (or Walrasian equilibrium) of an economy.
Arrow-Debreu security

A contract that agrees to pay one unit of a numeraire (a currency or a commodity) if a particular state occurs at a particular time in the future and pays zero numeraire in all the other states.
Arrow information paradox (AIP)

A problem faced by companies when considering the transfer of intellectual property. A company may wish to sell some information, but it cannot fully describe the capabilities of the information without effectively transferring the information for free.
Arrow's impossibility theorem

When voters have three or more distinct options, no ranked voting electoral system can convert the ranked preferences of individuals into a community-wide (complete and transitive) ranking while also meeting the specified set of criteria: unrestricted domain, non-dictatorship, Pareto efficiency, and independence of irrelevant alternatives.
Associate's Degree
An academic program taken at the undergraduate level and after secondary school, which is considered a two-year degree and can be obtained from a community college, junior college, or some four-year universities.
Atkinson–Stiglitz theorem
Where the utility function is separable between labor and all commodities, no indirect taxes need be employed.
Aumann's agreement theorem
If the probabilistic beliefs of agents who share a common prior and update their probabilistic beliefs by Bayes' rule, regarding a fixed event, are common knowledge then these probabilities must coincide. Thus, agents cannot have common knowledge of a disagreement over the posterior probability of a given event.
austerity
A set of political-economic policies that aim to reduce government budget deficits through spending cuts, tax increases, or a combination of both.
Austrian School
A heterodox school of economic thought that is based on methodological individualism—the concept that social phenomena result from the motivations and actions of individuals.
autarky
The characteristic of being self-sufficient; the term is usually applied to political states or their economic systems. Autarky is possible when an entity can survive or continue its activities without external assistance or international trade. If a self-sufficient economy also deliberately refuses all trade with the outside world, then it is called a closed economy.
automatic stabilizer
A feature of the structure of modern government budgets, particularly income taxes and welfare spending, that acts to damp out fluctuations in real GDP.
autonomous consumption

The consumption expenditure that occurs when income levels are zero. Such consumption is considered autonomous of income only when expenditure on these consumables does not vary with changes in income; generally, it may be required to fund necessities and debt obligations. If income levels are actually zero, this consumption counts as dissaving, because it is financed by borrowing or using up savings.
average cost

A quantity equal to the total cost divided by the number of goods produced (the output quantity, Q). It is also equal to the sum of variable costs (total variable costs divided by Q) plus average fixed costs (total fixed costs divided by Q).
average fixed cost
The fixed costs (FC) of production divided by the quantity (Q) of output produced. Fixed costs are those costs that must be incurred in fixed quantity regardless of the level of output produced.
average variable cost
A firm's variable costs (labour, electricity, etc.) divided by the quantity of output produced. Variable costs are those costs which vary with the output.
average tax rate
The ratio of the total amount of taxes paid to the total tax base (taxable income or spending), expressed as a percentage.

== B ==
Backus–Kehoe–Kydland puzzle

The observation that consumption is much less correlated across countries than output. According to theory we should observe that consumption is much more correlated across countries than output in an Arrow–Debreu economy.
Backus–Smith puzzle

The observation that the correlations between consumption and real exchange rates are zero or negative. This is contrary to economic theory which predicts that with full risk sharing, relative consumption should be perfectly correlated with the real exchange rate.
backward advantage

The advantage that a still-developing country has because it can take advantage of the technology/industry gap with a developed country by implementing a new technology or venturing into an industry that is new to its economy but mature in the developed country.
backward disadvantage

The fact that it is easier for late-development countries to imitate technologies, but more difficult to imitate the system, because the reform will offend vested interests.
backward induction
The process of reasoning backward in time, from the end of a problem or situation, to determine a sequence of optimal actions. It proceeds by first considering the last time a decision might be made and choosing what to do in any situation at that time. Using this information, one can then determine what to do at the second-to-last time of decision. This process continues backward until one has determined the best action for every possible situation (i.e. for every possible information set) at every point in time.
balance of payments

A record or summary of all economic transactions between the residents of a country and the rest of the world in a particular period of time (e.g. over a quarter of a year or, more commonly, over a year). These transactions are made by individuals, firms and government bodies. Thus the balance of payments includes all external visible and non-visible transactions of a country.
balance of trade

The difference between the monetary value of a nation's exports and imports over a certain period. Sometimes a distinction is made between a balance of trade for goods versus one for services. "Balance of trade" can be a misleading term because trade measures a flow of exports and imports over a given period of time, rather than a balance of exports and imports at a given point in time. Also, balance of trade does not necessarily imply that exports and imports are "in balance" with each other or anything else.
balanced budget
A budget in which revenues equal expenditures. Thus, neither a budget deficit nor a budget surplus exists (the accounts "balance"). The term may also refer more generally to a budget that has no budget deficit but could possibly have a budget surplus. A cyclically balanced budget is a budget that is not necessarily balanced year-to-year, but is balanced over the economic cycle, running a surplus in boom years and running a deficit in lean years, with these offsetting over time.
bank
A financial institution that accepts deposits from the public and creates credit. Lending activities can be performed either directly or indirectly through capital markets. Due to their importance in the financial stability of a country, banks are highly regulated in most countries. Most nations have institutionalized a system known as fractional reserve banking, under which banks hold liquid assets equal to only a portion of their current liabilities. In addition to other regulations intended to ensure liquidity, banks are generally subject to minimum capital requirements based on an international set of capital standards, known as the Basel Accords.
bank rate

The rate of interest which a central bank charges on its loans and advances to a commercial bank.
bankruptcy
The inability to pay debt due to loss of income, increased spending, or an unforeseen financial crisis.
bargaining model of war
A method of representing the potential gains and losses and ultimate outcome of war between two actors as a bargaining interaction.
barriers to entry
In theories of competition in economics, a cost that must be incurred by a new entrant into a market that incumbents do not have or have not had to incur. Because barriers to entry protect incumbent firms and restrict competition in a market, they can contribute to distortionary prices and are therefore most important when discussing antitrust policy. Barriers to entry often cause or aid the existence of monopolies or give companies market power.
barter

In trade, a system of exchange in which participants in a transaction directly exchange goods or services for other goods or services without using a medium of exchange, such as money. Economists distinguish barter from gift economies in many ways; barter, for example, features immediate reciprocal exchange that is not delayed in time. Barter usually takes place on a bilateral basis, but may be multilateral (i.e. mediated through a trade exchange). In most developed countries, barter usually only exists parallel to monetary systems to a very limited extent. Market actors use barter as a replacement for money as the method of exchange in times of monetary crisis, such as when currency becomes unstable (e.g. by hyperinflation or a deflationary spiral) or simply unavailable for conducting commerce.
base erosion and profit shifting (BEPS)
Corporate tax planning strategies used by multinationals to "shift" profits from higher-tax jurisdictions to lower-tax jurisdictions or no-tax locations.
Baxter-Stockman neutrality of exchange rate regime puzzle

The unexpectedly weak relationship between the exchange rate and any other macroeconomic variable.
Beckstrom's law
"The value of a network equals the net value added to each user's transactions conducted through that network, summed over all users."
behavioral economics
The branch of economics that studies the effects of psychological, cognitive, emotional, cultural and social factors on the economic decisions of individuals and institutions and how those decisions vary from those implied by classical theory.
Bellman equation
The dynamic programming equation associated with discrete-time optimization problems. It writes the "value" of a decision problem at a certain point in time in terms of the payoff from some initial choices and the "value" of the remaining decision problem that results from those initial choices.
bequest motive
Seeks to provide an economic justification for the phenomenon of intergenerational transfers of wealth; in other words, to explain why people leave money behind when they die.
Bertrand competition
A model of competition that describes interactions among producers that set prices and their consumers that choose quantities at the prices set.
Bertrand–Edgeworth model
A microeconomic model of price-setting oligopoly which studies what happens when there is a homogeneous product (i.e. consumers want to buy from the cheapest seller) where there is a limit to the output of firms which they are willing and able to sell at a particular price. This differs from the Bertrand competition model where it is assumed that firms are willing and able to meet all demand. The limit to output can be considered a physical capacity constraint which is the same at all prices (as in Edgeworth's work) or to vary with price under other assumptions.
Bertrand paradox
A situation in which two players (firms) reach a state of Nash equilibrium where both firms charge a price equal to marginal cost.
biflation

A state of the economy in which the processes of inflation and deflation occur simultaneously in different parts of the economy.
big push model
A concept in development economics or welfare economics that emphasizes that a firm's decision whether to industrialize or not depends on its expectation of what other firms will do. It assumes economies of scale and oligopolistic market structure and explains when industrialization would happen.
Birmingham school
A school of thought based around opposing the gold standard, advocating for expansionary monetary policy, and belief in underconsumption.
Bishop–Cannings theorem
A theorem in evolutionary game theory that states that (i) all members of a mixed evolutionarily stable strategy have the same payoff, and (ii) that none of these can also be a pure ESS.
Black–Scholes model

A mathematical model for the dynamics of a financial market containing derivative investment instruments. From the partial differential equation in the model, known as the Black–Scholes equation, one can deduce the Black–Scholes formula, which gives a theoretical estimate of the price of European-style options and shows that the option has a unique price regardless of the risk of the security and its expected return (instead replacing the security's expected return with the risk-neutral rate). The formula led to a boom in options trading and provided mathematical legitimacy to the activities of the Chicago Board Options Exchange and other options markets around the world. It is widely used, although often with adjustments and corrections, by options market participants.
board of governors
The main governing body that directs the operations of the United States Federal Reserve System. Its seven members supervise the 12 Federal Reserve Districts.
bond
In finance, an instrument of indebtedness of the bond issuer to the holders. The most common types of bonds include municipal bonds and corporate bonds. The bond is a debt security, under which the issuer owes the holders a debt and (depending on the terms of the bond) is obliged to pay them interest (the coupon) or to repay the principal at a later date, termed the maturity date. Interest is usually payable at fixed intervals (semiannual, annual, or sometimes monthly). Very often the bond is negotiable, that is, the ownership of the instrument can be transferred in the secondary market. This means that once the transfer agents at the bank medallion stamp the bond, it is highly liquid on the secondary market.
Bondareva–Shapley theorem
Describes a necessary and sufficient condition for the non-emptiness of the core of a cooperative game in characteristic function form.
boots theory

Purchasing cheap, low-quality goods may become more expensive in the long run because they must be replaced more frequently. For example, purchasing expensive, high-quality boots may be cheaper over a long time because cheaper boots would quickly wear out and require replacement.
borrower
See debtor.
bounded rationality
The idea that rationality is limited when individuals make decisions, and under these limitations, rational individuals will select a decision that is satisfactory rather than optimal.
Braess's paradox
The observation that adding one or more roads to a road network can slow down overall traffic flow through it.
Brander–Spencer model
An economic model in international trade that illustrates a situation where a government can subsidize domestic firms to help them in their competition against foreign producers and in doing so enhances national welfare.
break-even

The point at which total cost and total revenue are equal, i.e. "even". There is no net loss or gain, and one has "broken even", though opportunity costs have been paid and capital has received the risk-adjusted, expected return. In short, all costs that must be paid are paid, and there is neither profit nor loss.
Bretton Woods system
A monetary system which established the rules for commercial and financial relations among the United States, Canada, Western Europe, Australia, and Japan after the 1944 Bretton Woods Agreement. The Bretton Woods system was the first example of a fully negotiated monetary order intended to govern monetary relations among independent states. The chief features were an obligation for each country to adopt a monetary policy that maintained its external exchange rates within 1 percent by tying its currency to gold and the ability of the IMF to bridge temporary imbalances of payments; there was also a need to address the lack of cooperation among other countries and to prevent competitive devaluation of the currencies.
budget
The itemization of an individual's or firm's total income and total expenses for a set period of time, usually a month or a year.
budget deficit

The amount by which spending exceeds revenue over a particular period of time; it is the opposite of budget surplus. The term may be applied to the budget of a government, private company, or individual.
budget set

The set of all possible consumption bundles that an individual can afford, given the prices of goods and the individual's income level. The budget set is bounded above by the budget line. Graphically speaking, all the consumption bundles that lie inside and on the budget constraint form the budget set. By most definitions, budget sets must be compact and convex.
budget share Engel curve
Describes how the proportion of household income spent on a good or service varies with income.
budget surplus
A budget's revenues in excess of its expenditures.
buffer stock scheme

An attempt to use commodity storage for the purposes of stabilising prices in an entire economy or an individual (commodity) market. Specifically, commodities are bought when a surplus exists in the economy, stored, and are then sold from these stores when economic shortages in the economy occur.
bullionism
An economic theory that defines wealth by the amount of precious metals owned.
business cycle

The downward and upward movement of gross domestic product (GDP) around its long-term growth trend. The length of a business cycle is the period of time containing a single boom and contraction in sequence. These fluctuations typically involve shifts over time between periods of relatively rapid economic growth (expansions or booms) and periods of relative stagnation or decline (contractions or recessions).
business economics
A branch of applied economics which uses economic theory and quantitative methods to analyze business enterprises and the factors contributing to the diversity of organizational structures and the relationships of firms with labour, capital and product markets.
business sector

The part of the economy made up by companies. It is generally considered a subset of the domestic economy, excluding the economic activities of general government, of private households, and of non-profit organizations serving individuals.

== C ==
Cambridge capital controversy

A dispute between proponents of two differing theoretical and mathematical positions in economics concerning the nature and role of capital goods and a critique of the neoclassical vision of aggregate production and distribution.
Cambridge equation
Relates money demand, price level, and real national income in the Cambridge quantity theory of money.
cameralism
A German science of public administration in the 18th and early 19th centuries that aimed at strong management of a centralized economy for the benefit mainly of the state.
cap and trade (CAT)
A market-based approach to limiting negative externalities (for example, pollution) by providing economic incentives for reducing the production of said negative externalities. A central authority or governmental body allocates or sells a limited number (a "cap") of permits that allow the creation of a specific negative externality over a set time period. Permit owners are then allowed to sell these permits to others.
capacity utilization
The extent to which an enterprise or a nation uses its installed productive capacity. It is the relationship between output that is produced with the installed equipment and the potential output which could be produced with it if capacity was fully used.
capital
Any asset that can enhance one's power to perform economically useful work. Capital goods, real capital, or capital assets are already-produced, durable goods or any non-financial asset that is used in production of goods or services. Capital is distinct from land (or non-renewable resources) in that capital can be increased by human labor. At any given moment in time, total physical capital may be referred to as the capital stock (which is not to be confused with the capital stock of a business entity).
capital account

Reflects net change in ownership of national assets. A surplus in the capital account means money is flowing into the country, and the inbound flows effectively represent borrowings or sales of assets. A deficit in the capital account means money is flowing out of the country, and it suggests the nation is increasing its ownership of foreign assets.
capital accumulation
Any net addition to existing wealth and/or a redistribution of wealth. Capital accumulation is the dynamic that motivates the pursuit of profit, involving the investment of money or any financial asset with the goal of increasing the initial monetary value of said asset as a financial return.
capital cost
A fixed, one-time expense incurred on the purchase of land, buildings, construction, and equipment used in the production of goods or in the rendering of services. In other words, it is the total cost needed to bring a project to a commercially operable status. Whether a particular cost is capital or not depends on many factors, such as accounting, tax laws, and materiality.
capital flight
Occurs when money or assets rapidly flow out of a country due to an event of economic consequence. Such events may include an increase in taxes on capital or capital holders or the government of the country defaulting on its debt that disturbs investors and causes them to lower their valuation of the assets in that country or otherwise to lose confidence in its economic strength.
capital formation
Any method for increasing the amount of capital owned or under one's control, or any method in using or mobilizing capital resources for investment purposes. Capital formation also sometimes refers to a specific statistical concept, also known as net investment, which measures the net additions to the (physical) capital stock of a country (or an economic sector) in an accounting interval. Capital formation is also sometimes a modern general term for capital accumulation, referring to the total "stock of capital" that has been formed, or to the growth of this total capital stock.
capital gain
The profit earned on the sale of an asset which has increased in value over the holding period. An asset may include tangible property, a car, a business, or intangible property such as shares.
capital good
A durable good that is used in the production of goods or services. Capital goods are one of the three types of producer goods, the other two being land and labour, which are also known collectively as primary factors of production. This classification originated with classical economics and has remained the dominant method for classification.
capital intensity
The amount of fixed or real capital present in relation to other factors of production, especially labor. At the level of either a production process or the aggregate economy, it may be estimated by the capital to labor ratio, such as from the points along a capital/labor isoquant.
capitalism
An economic system based on the private ownership of the means of production and their operation for profit. Central characteristics of capitalism include capital accumulation, competitive markets, price systems, private property, property rights recognition, voluntary exchange, and wage labor.
cartel
Any group of firms that colludes and acts as a single coordinated whole to restrict output and drive up prices.
cash
Money in the physical form of currency, such as banknotes and coins.
cash crop
A cash crop, also called profit crop, is an agricultural crop which is grown to sell for profit. It is typically purchased by parties separate from a farm.
central bank

An institution that manages the currency, money supply, and interest rates of an entire state or nation. Central banks also usually oversee the commercial banking system of their respective countries. In contrast to a commercial bank, a central bank possesses a monopoly on increasing the monetary base in the state, and usually also prints the national currency, which usually serves as the state's legal tender. Central banks also act as a "lender of last resort" to the banking sector during times of financial crisis. Most central banks usually also have supervisory and regulatory powers to ensure the solvency of member institutions, prevent bank runs, and prevent reckless or fraudulent behavior by member banks.
Certificate of Deposit (CD or COD)
A savings instrument that usually earns more interest than a savings account but is bound by limits set within a contract.
ceteris paribus
A phrase or clause often loosely translated as "holding all else constant." It does not imply that no other things will in fact change; rather, it isolates the effect of one particular change.
charitable giving
A gift of cash or property made to a nonprofit organization to help it accomplish its goals, for which the donor receives nothing of value in return. In the U.S. however, some charitable giving is tax deductible.
chartalism
A heterodox theory of money that argues that money originated historically with states' attempts to direct economic activity rather than as a spontaneous solution to the problems with barter or as a means with which to tokenize debt, and that fiat currency has value in exchange because of sovereign power to levy taxes on economic activity payable in the currency they issue.
check (money)
A check is a written, dated, and signed draft that directs a bank to pay a specific sum of money to the bearer. The person or entity writing the check is known as the payor or drawer, while the person to whom the check is written is the payee.
Chicago school
A neoclassical school of thought once based around rational expectations, monetarism, and free market supremacy.
Choice (CD or COD)
Making a decision when facing multiple possible options.
choice modelling
A method of modelling the decision process of an individual or segment via revealed or stated preferences.
circular flow of income

A model of the economy in which the major exchanges are represented as flows of money, goods and services, etc. between economic agents. The flows of money and goods exchanged in a closed circuit correspond in value, but run in the opposite direction. The circular flow analysis is the basis of national accounts and hence of macroeconomics.
circulation
The continuous movement of goods, services, and money within an economy.
citizen's dividend
A proposed set of regular payments to all citizens from revenue raised by leasing or taxing the monopoly of valuable land and other natural resources. It is based on the Georgist principle that the natural world is the common property of all people.
classical economics

A school of thought in economics that flourished, primarily in Britain, in the late 18th and early-to-mid 19th century. Its main thinkers are held to be Adam Smith, Jean-Baptiste Say, David Ricardo, Thomas Robert Malthus, and John Stuart Mill. These economists produced a theory of market economies as largely self-regulating systems, governed by natural laws of production and exchange (famously captured by Adam Smith's metaphor of the invisible hand).
classical general equilibrium model
A model that aims to describe the economy by aggregating the behavior of individuals and firms. Note that the classical general equilibrium model is unrelated to classical economics, and was instead developed within neoclassical economics beginning in the late 19th century.
club good

A good that is excludable but non-rivalrous, at least until reaching a point where congestion occurs.
Coase conjecture
A model in which a monopolist must sell its product at a low price because it is effectively in competition with itself over multiple periods. It is assumed that the monopolist sells a durable good to a market where resale is impossible, faces an infinite time horizon, faces consumers who have different valuations, and does not know individuals' valuations.
Coase theorem
States that if the provision of a good or service results in an externality and trade in that good or service is possible, then bargaining will lead to a Pareto efficient outcome regardless of the initial allocation of property. This requires sufficiently low transaction costs in the bargaining and exchange process.
cobweb model

A model which describes cyclical supply and demand in a market where the amount produced must be chosen before prices are observed. Producers' expectations about prices are assumed to be based on observations of previous prices. It explains why prices may be subjected to periodic fluctuations in certain types of markets.
collateral loan
Also known as a secured loan, it is a loan where the borrower pledges an asset to a financial institution to access funds. The asset, called collateral, protects the lender from possible defaulting as they would take ownership in case of default.
collective action
Any action taken together by a group of people whose goal is to enhance their condition and achieve a common objective.
collective action problem

A situation in which all individuals would be better off cooperating but fail to do so because of conflicting interests between individuals that discourage joint action.
collusion
A deceitful agreement or secret cooperation between two or more parties to limit open competition by deceiving, misleading or defrauding others of their legal right.
command economy
An economy in which the government directs all economic activity.
commerce
Relates to "the exchange of goods and services, especially on a large scale". It includes legal, economic, political, social, cultural and technological systems that operate in a country or in international trade.
commercial agriculture
It is a type of agriculture, both of crop plants and of animals, with higher levels of input and output per unit of agricultural land area.
commodity
An economic good or service that has full or substantial fungibility: that is, the market treats instances of the good as equivalent or nearly so with no regard to who produced them.
communism
An ideology centered around common ownership of the means of production, distribution, and exchange that allocates products to everyone in the society based on need.
comparative advantage

The ability to produce most efficiently given all of the other products that could be produced.
compensating differential

The additional amount of income that a given worker must be offered to motivate them to accept a given undesirable job, relative to other jobs that worker could perform.
Competition (CD or COD)
The presence in a market of independent buyers and sellers competing with one another and the freedom of buyers and sellers to enter and leave the market.
competition law

Any law that promotes or seeks to maintain market competition by regulating anti-competitive conduct by companies.
competitive market
A market in which many sellers compete against each other to attract customers. Each seller has an incentive to sell at the lowest price possible to attract customers, so prices tend to be driven so low that the sellers can just barely make a profit.
complementary goods
Goods that are bought and used together.
complex multiplier
The multiplier by which a change in autonomous expenditure changes the equilibrium income in an economy.
compound interest
The addition of interest to the principal sum of a loan or deposit; it is often interpreted as "interest on interest". Compound interest is the result of reinvesting interest, rather than paying it out, so that interest in the next period is then earned on the principal sum plus any previously accumulated interest. Contrast simple interest.
computable general equilibrium (CGE)

A class of economic models that use actual economic data to estimate how an economy might react to changes in policy, technology, or other external factors.
computational economics
A research discipline at the interface of economics, computer science, and management science which encompasses computational modeling of economic systems, whether agent-based, general-equilibrium, macroeconomic, or rational-expectations, computational econometrics and statistics, computational finance, computational tools for the design of automated internet markets, programming tools specifically designed for computational economics, and pedagogical tools for the teaching of computational economics.
concentration ratio
The sum of the percentage market shares of (a pre-specified number of) the largest firms in an industry, which is used to quantify market concentration in an industry.
conspicuous consumption
The consumer practice of buying and using goods of a higher quality, price, or in greater quantity than practical.
conspicuous compassion
The ostentatious use of charity meant to enhance the reputation and social prestige of the donor.
consumer
A member of a household that spends on goods and services.
consumer choice
A theory of microeconomics that relates preferences to consumption expenditures and to consumer demand curves. It analyzes how consumers maximize the desirability of their consumption as measured by their preferences subject to limitations on their expenditures, by maximizing utility subject to a consumer budget constraint.
consumer confidence
An economic indicator that measures the degree of optimism that consumers feel about the overall state of the economy and their personal financial situation.
consumer credit
A loan afforded to a consumer for the payment of goods and services which they will have to repay to the lender over time usually plus interest.
consumer price index (CPI)
Measures changes in the price level of market basket of consumer goods and services purchased by households. The CPI is a statistical estimate constructed using the prices of a sample of representative items whose prices are collected periodically. Sub-indices and sub-sub-indices are computed for different categories and sub-categories of goods and services, being combined to produce the overall index with weights reflecting their shares in the total of the consumer expenditures covered by the index. It is one of several price indices calculated by most national statistical agencies. The annual percentage change in a CPI is used as a measure of inflation. A CPI can be used to index (i.e. adjust for the effect of inflation) the real value of wages, salaries, and pensions; to regulate prices; and to deflate monetary magnitudes to show changes in real values. In most countries, the CPI, along with the population census, is one of the most closely watched national economic statistics.
consumer surplus
the difference between the maximum price a consumer is willing to pay and the actual price they do pay. If a consumer is willing to pay more for a unit of a good than the current asking price, they are getting more benefit from the purchased product than they would if the price was their maximum willingness to pay. They are receiving the same benefit, the obtainment of the good, with a smaller cost as they are spending less than they would if they were charged their maximum willingness to pay.
consumerism
Economic policies which emphasize consumption.
consumption
According to mainstream economists, only the final purchase of goods and services by individuals constitutes consumption, while other types of expenditure—in particular, fixed investment, intermediate consumption, and government spending—are placed in separate categories (see consumer choice). Other economists define consumption much more broadly, as the aggregate of all economic activity that does not entail the design, production and marketing of goods and services (e.g. the selection, adoption, use, disposal and recycling of goods and services).
consumption function
A mathematical function which describes a relationship between consumption and disposable income. The concept is believed to have been introduced into macroeconomics by John Maynard Keynes in 1936, who used it to develop the notion of a government spending multiplier.
contract curve
In microeconomics, the contract curve is the set of points representing final allocations of two goods between two people that could occur as a result of mutually beneficial trading between those people given their initial allocations of the goods. All the points on this locus are Pareto efficient allocations, meaning that from any one of these points there is no reallocation that could make one of the people more satisfied with his or her allocation without making the other person less satisfied. The contract curve is the subset of the Pareto efficient points that could be reached by trading from the people's initial holdings of the two goods.
contract theory
The study of how economic actors can and do construct contractual arrangements, generally in the presence of asymmetric information. Because of its connections with both agency and incentives, contract theory is often categorized within a field known as law and economics.
convergence

The hypothesis that poorer economies' per capita incomes will tend to grow at faster rates than richer economies.
convexity
In the Arrow–Debreu model of general economic equilibrium, agents have convex budget sets and convex preferences: at equilibrium prices, the budget hyperplane supports the best attainable indifference curve. The profit function is the convex conjugate of the cost function. Convex analysis is the standard tool for analyzing textbook economics. Non‑convex phenomena in economics have been studied with nonsmooth analysis, which generalizes convex analysis.
coordination good
A good created by the coordination of people within civil society. Coordination goods are non-rivalrous, but may be partially excludable through the means of withholding cooperation from a non-cooperative state.
corporate tax

A type of direct tax levied on the income or capital of corporations and other similar legal entities.
corporation
A type of business organization owned by many people but treated by law as though it were an individual person; it can own property, pay taxes, make contracts, and contribute to political causes.
cost
1. The value of money that is used up to produce a good or deliver a service, and hence is no longer available for further use. In business, the cost may be one of acquisition, in which case the amount of money expended to acquire a good or service is counted as the cost; in this case, money is the input that is gone to acquire the thing. This acquisition cost may be the sum of the cost of production as incurred by the original producer and of further costs of transaction as incurred by the acquirer over and above the price paid to the producer. Usually, the price designated by the producer also includes a mark-up for profit over the cost of production.
2. More generally, a performance metric that is totaling up as a result of a process or as a differential for the result of a decision. Hence cost is the metric used in the standard modeling paradigm applied to economic processes. Costs (pl.) are often further described based on their timing or their applicability.
cost curve
A graph of the costs of production as a function of total quantity produced. In a free market economy, productively efficient firms optimize their production process by minimizing cost consistent with each possible level of production, and the result is a cost curve; and profit maximizing firms use cost curves to decide output quantities. There are various types of cost curves, all related to each other, including total and average cost curves; marginal ("for each additional unit") cost curves, which are equal to the differential of the total cost curves; and variable cost curves. Some are applicable to the short run, others to the long run.
cost of living
The cost of maintaining a certain standard of living. Changes in the cost of living over time are often operationalized in a cost-of-living index. Cost of living calculations are also used to compare the cost of maintaining a certain standard of living in different geographic areas. Differences in cost of living between locations can also be measured in terms of purchasing power parity rates.
cost overrun

A situation involving unexpected incurred costs. A cost overrun occurs when an underestimation of the actual cost during budgeting results in costs that are in excess of budgeted amounts.
cost the limit of price
A maxim indicating a (prescriptive) version of the labor theory of value. It suggests that the price of a good should be equal to its cost, implying that profit, rent, and interest could be considered unjust economic arrangements.
Cournot competition
A model used to describe an industry structure in which companies compete on the amount of output they will produce, which they decide on independently of each other and at the same time.
cost-benefit analysis (CBA)

A systematic approach to estimating the strengths and weaknesses of alternative options (for example in transactions, activities, or functional business requirements). It is often used to determine the option or options that provide the best approach to achieve benefits while preserving savings. Cost-benefit analysis may be used to compare potential (or completed) courses of actions, or estimate (or evaluate) the value against costs of a single decision, project, or policy. Common areas of application include commercial transactions, functional business decisions, policy decisions (especially government policy), and project investments.
cost-of-production theory of value
The theory that the price of an object or condition is determined by the sum of the cost of the resources that went into producing it. The cost can comprise any of the factors of production (including labor, capital, or land) as well as taxation.
cost-push inflation
A purported type of inflation caused by increases in the cost of important goods or services where no suitable alternative is available. As businesses face higher prices for underlying inputs, they are forced to increase prices of their outputs.
credit bureau
An agency that tracks the credit, employment, and housing history of consumers and assigns them a credit score.
credit card
A payment card issued to users (cardholders) to enable the cardholder to pay a merchant for goods and services based on the cardholder's promise to the card issuer to pay them at a later time for the cost of the good or service plus other agreed-upon fees and charges. The card issuer (usually a bank) creates a revolving account and grants a line of credit to the cardholder, from which the cardholder can borrow money for payment to a merchant or as a cash advance.
credit score
A numerical value assigned to a person's potential ability to repay debt. A good credit score in the United States is approximately 700.
credit rating
An evaluation of the credit risk of a prospective debtor (an individual, business, company, or government), predicting their ability to pay back the debt, and an implicit forecast of the likelihood of the debtor defaulting on the debt. Credit rating represents an evaluation of a credit rating agency of the qualitative and quantitative information for the prospective debtor, including information provided by the prospective debtor and other non-public information obtained by the credit rating agency's analysts. A subset of credit rating called credit reporting or credit score is a numeric evaluation of an individual's credit worthiness, which is conducted by a credit bureau or consumer credit reporting agency.
credit union
A financial institution that is usually local and owned by its members.
creditor
A person or a firm that lends money to a borrower.
crisis theory
A set of theories concerning the causes and consequences of the tendency for the rate of profit to fall in a capitalist system.
criticism of capitalism
A critique of political economy that involves the rejection of, or dissatisfaction with the economic system of capitalism and its outcomes.
critique of work
cross elasticity of demand (XED)
Measures the sensitivity of a good's demand to the price of a different good.
crowding out
A phenomenon that occurs when increased government involvement in a sector of a market economy substantially affects the remainder of the market, either on the supply or demand side of the market.
crowding-in effect
An increase in private investment that results from government spending. It occurs because public investment makes the private sector more productive, as well as because government spending may have a stimulative effect on the economy.
cultural economics
The branch of economics that studies the relationship between culture and economic outcomes. Here, "culture" is defined by shared beliefs and preferences of respective groups. Programmatic issues include whether and how much culture matters to economic outcomes and what its relation is to institutions. As a growing field in behavioral economics, the role of culture in economic behavior is increasingly being demonstrated to cause significant differentials in decision-making and the management and valuation of assets.
currency
Money in any form when in actual use or circulation as a medium of exchange, especially circulating banknotes and coins. A more general definition is that a currency is a "system" of money (monetary units) in common use, especially within a particular nation.
current account
A country's current account is one of the two components of its balance of payments, the other being the capital account (also known as the financial account). The current account consists of the balance of trade, net primary income or factor income (earnings on foreign investments minus payments made to foreign investors) and net cash transfers, that have taken place over a given period of time. The current account balance is one of two major measures of a country's foreign trade (the other being the net capital outflow). A current account surplus indicates that the value of a country's net foreign assets (i.e. assets less liabilities) grew over the period in question, and a current account deficit indicates that it shrank. Both government and private payments are included in the calculation. It is called the current account because goods and services are generally consumed in the current period.
cyclical unemployment
Unemployment resulting from the business cycle. It is unpredictable.

== D ==
DAD–SAS model
A macroeconomic model based on the AD-AS model, but examining the relationship between inflation and income, rather than price level and income. DAD is short for Dynamic Aggregate Demand, and SAS is short for Surprise Aggregate Supply.
dead cat bounce

A small, brief recovery in the price of a declining asset.
deadweight loss

A loss of economic efficiency that occurs when the free-market equilibrium for a good or service is not achieved. Deadweight loss can be caused by monopoly pricing in the case of artificial scarcity, an externality, a tax or subsidy, or a compulsory price ceiling or price floor such as a minimum wage.
Debreu's representation theorems
A set of preference representation theorems proved by Gerard Debreu. They specify some conditions on the preference relation that guarantee the existence of a representing utility function.
debt
Total money owed.
debit card
A debit card is a payment card that allows you to make purchases and withdraw cash from your bank account. Debit cards are also known as "check cards." They look and work similarly to credit cards, but they use money that's already in your checking account instead of money you borrow.
debtor
An entity that owes a debt to another entity. The entity may be an individual, a firm, a government, a company, or another legal person. The counterparty to which the debt is owed is called a creditor. When the counterparty of the arrangement is a bank, the debtor is more often referred to as a borrower.
deficit spending

The amount by which spending exceeds revenue over a particular period of time; it is the opposite of budget surplus. The term may be applied to the budget of a government, private company, or individual.
deflation
A decrease in the general price level of goods and services. Deflation occurs when the inflation rate falls below 0% (a negative inflation rate); though inflation reduces the value of currency over time, deflation increases it. This allows more goods and services to be bought than before with the same amount of currency. Deflation is distinct from disinflation, which occurs when the inflation rate decreases but is still positive.
deflator
A value that allows data to be measured over time in terms of some base period, usually through a price index, to distinguish between changes in the money value of a gross national product (GNP) that come from a change in prices, and changes from a change in physical output. It is the measure of the price level for some quantity. A deflator serves as a price index in which the effects of inflation are nulled. It is the difference between real and nominal GDP.
deleveraging
A reduction in debt. At the micro-economic level, it is measured as the reduction of the leverage ratio, or the percentage of debt in the balance sheet of a single economic entity, such as a household or a firm. At the macro-economic level, it is usually measured as a decline of the total debt to GDP ratio in the national accounts.
demand
The whole range of quantities that a person or group with a given income and preferences demands at various prices.
demand curve
A line on a graph that represents how much of a good or service buyers are going to consume at various prices.
demand deposit
Demand deposits, bank money or scriptural money are funds held in demand deposit accounts in commercial banks. These account balances are usually considered money and form the greater part of the narrowly defined money supply of a country.
demand shock
A sudden event that increases or decreases demand for goods or services temporarily.
demand-pull inflation
A purported type of inflation caused by an increase in aggregate demand greater than the increase in aggregate supply. As real gross domestic product rises and unemployment falls, the economy moves along the Phillips curve and prices increase.
demographic economics

The application of economic analysis to demography, the study of human populations, including size, growth, density, distribution, and vital statistics.
dependent care plan
A pre-tax account used to pay for either child or adult care while a married couple works, looks for work, or studies.
depreciation
The gradual decrease in the economic value of the capital stock of a firm, nation, or other entity, either through physical depreciation, obsolescence, or changes in the demand for the services of the capital in question. If the capital stock is $K_t$ in one period $t$, gross (total) investment spending on newly produced capital is $I_t$ and depreciation is $D_t$, the capital stock in the next period, $K_{t+1}$, is $K_t + I_t - D_t$. The net increment to the capital stock is the difference between gross investment and depreciation, and is called net investment.
depression
A sustained, long-term decrease in economic activity in one or more economies. It is a more severe economic downturn than a recession, which is a slowdown in economic activity over the course of a normal business cycle.
deregulation
The process of removing or reducing economic regulations, or the total repeal of governmental regulation of the economy. It became common in advanced industrial economies in the 1970s and 1980s, as a result of new trends in economic thinking about the inefficiencies of government regulation, and the risk that regulatory agencies would be controlled by the regulated industry to its benefit, and thereby hurt consumers and the wider economy.
Diamond–Dybvig model
A model of bank runs and related financial crises. The model shows how banks' mix of illiquid assets (such as business or mortgage loans) and liquid liabilities (deposits which may be withdrawn at any time) may give rise to self-fulfilling panics among depositors.
differentiated Bertrand competition
A variation of Bertrand competition where each firm produces a somewhat differentiated product, and consequently faces a demand curve that is downward-sloping for all levels of the firm's price. This provides a solution to the Bertrand paradox (economics).
diminishing marginal utility
A situation where each additional, or marginal, unit of a good or service that is consumed brings less utility than the previous unit.
diminishing returns
The decrease in the marginal (incremental) output of a production process as the amount of a single factor of production is incrementally increased, while the amounts of all other factors of production stay constant. The law of diminishing returns states that in all productive processes, adding more of one factor of production while holding all others constant ("ceteris paribus"), will at some point yield lower incremental per-unit returns. It does not imply that adding more of a factor will decrease the total production, a condition known as negative returns, though in practice this is common.
discounting
A mechanism in which a debtor obtains the right to delay payments to a creditor, for a defined period of time, in exchange for a charge or fee. Essentially, the party that owes money in the present purchases the right to delay the payment until some future date.
discrete choice

A set of models that describe, explain, and predict choices between two or more discrete alternatives, such as entering or not entering the labor market, or choosing between modes of transport. These models examine situations in which the potential outcomes are discrete, such that the optimum is not characterized by standard first-order conditions.
discretionary income
Money available after one pays taxes and all other necessary expenses like housing and transportation.
disequilibrium macroeconomics

A tradition of research centered on the role of disequilibrium in economics.
disinflation
A decrease in the rate of inflation; a slowdown in the rate of increase of the general price level of goods and services in an economy's gross domestic product over time. It is the opposite of reflation. Disinflation is also distinct from deflation, which occurs when the inflation rate is negative.
dispersed knowledge
The notion that no single agent has information as to all of the factors which influence prices and production throughout the system.
disposable income
Money available after one pays taxes; income available for personal consumption and saving.
disposition effect
The tendency to sell an asset that has accumulated in value and resist selling an asset that has declined in value.
dissaving
Negative saving, which occurs when spending is greater than disposable income. This spending may be financed by already accumulated savings, such as money in a savings account, or it can be borrowed.
distribution
The way total economic output, income, or wealth is distributed among individuals or among the factors of production (such as labor, land, and capital). In general theory and the national income and product accounts, each unit of output corresponds to a unit of income.
dividends
Payments by a corporation of all or part of its profit to its stockholders (the corporate owners).
dividend imputation
A corporate tax system in which some or all of the tax paid by a company may be attributed, or imputed, to the shareholders by way of a tax credit to reduce the income tax payable on a distribution.
divorce
The dissolution of a marriage, which in many countries, is considered a contract of property which is shared among the spouses.
Dixit–Stiglitz model
A model of monopolistic competition which formalises consumers' preferences for product variety by using a CES function. In the model, variety preference is inherent within the assumption of monotonic preferences because a consumer with such preferences prefers to have an average of any two bundles of goods as opposed to extremes.
dollar auction
A non-zero sum sequential game that illustrates a paradox brought about by traditional rational choice theory in which players are compelled to make an ultimately irrational decision based completely on a sequence of apparently rational choices made throughout the game.
Domar serfdom model
A mid-to-late 20th century model that develops a hypothesis concerning the causes of agricultural slavery or serfdom in historical societies.
Dorfman-Steiner theorem

A theorem which specifies the optimal level of advertising that a firm should undertake.
double marginalization
A vertical externality that occurs when two firms with market power (i.e., not in a situation of perfect competition), at different vertical levels in the same supply chain, apply a mark-up to their prices. This is caused by the prospect of facing a steep demand curve slope, prompting the firm to mark-up the price beyond its marginal costs.
doughnut economics
A visual framework for sustainable development – shaped like a doughnut or lifebelt – combining the concept of planetary boundaries with the complementary concept of social boundaries. The name derives from the shape of the diagram, i.e. a disc with a hole in the middle.
Downs–Thomson paradox

A paradox that states that the equilibrium speed of car traffic on a road network is determined by the average door-to-door speed of equivalent journeys taken by public transport or the next best alternative. Although consistent with economic theory, it is a paradox in that it contradicts the common expectation that improvements in the road network will reduce traffic congestion.
dual-sector model

A model in developmental economics that explains the growth of a developing economy in terms of a labour transition between two sectors, the subsistence or traditional agricultural sector and the capitalist or modern industrial sector.
Duggan–Schwartz theorem
A result about voting systems designed to choose a nonempty set of winners from the preferences of certain individuals, where each individual ranks all candidates in order of preference.
duopoly
A situation in which there are exactly two suppliers for a particular good or service.
dynamic discrete choice

Models that simulate an agent's choices over discrete options that have future implications. Rather than assuming observed choices are the result of static utility maximization, observed choices in DDC models are assumed to result from an agent's maximization of the present value of utility, generalizing the utility theory upon which discrete choice models are based.
dynamic stochastic general equilibrium (DSGE)

A method in macroeconomics that attempts to explain economic phenomena, such as economic growth and business cycles, and the effects of economic policy, through econometric models based on applied general equilibrium theory and microeconomic principles.

== E ==
Easterlin paradox
A finding in happiness economics which states that at a point in time happiness varies directly with income both among and within nations, but over time happiness does not trend upward as income continues to grow: while people on higher incomes are typically happier than their lower-income counterparts at a given point in time, higher incomes don't produce greater happiness over time.
ecological model of competition
A reassessment of the nature of competition in the economy which models the economy on biology (growth, change, death, evolution, survival of the fittest, complex inter-relationships, non-linear relationships) rather than physics.
econometrics
The application of statistical methods to economic data to give empirical content to economic relationships. More precisely, it is "the quantitative analysis of actual economic phenomena based on the concurrent development of theory and observation, related by appropriate methods of inference".
economic base analysis
A theory that posits that activities in an area divide into two categories: basic and nonbasic. Basic industries are those exporting from the region and bringing wealth from outside, while nonbasic (or service) industries support basic industries.
economic calculation problem (ECP)
A criticism of using economic planning as a substitute for market-based allocation of the factors of production. It is argued that economy planning necessarily leads to an irrational and inefficient allocation of resources.
economic cost
The combination of losses of any goods that have a value attached to them by any one individual. Economic cost is used as means to compare the prudence of one course of action with that of another.
economic democracy

A socioeconomic philosophy that proposes to shift ownership and decision-making power from corporate shareholders and corporate managers (such as a board of directors) to a larger group of public stakeholders that includes workers, consumers, suppliers, communities and the broader public.
economic development
Broad improvement in the economic well-being or quality of life of a nation, region, or community, often but not necessarily as a consequence of economic growth.
economic efficiency
A variety of concepts which denote some situation where desired outputs (such as utility) are maximized given available inputs. This can include allocative efficiency, distributive efficiency, dynamic efficiency, financial market efficiency, Kaldor–Hicks efficiency, operational efficiency, Pareto efficiency, and productive efficiency.
economic equilibrium
A situation in which economic forces such as supply and demand are balanced and in which, in the absence of external influences, the values of economic variables do not change. For example, in the standard textbook model of perfect competition, equilibrium occurs at the point at which quantity demanded and quantity supplied are equal. Market equilibrium in this case is a condition in which a market price is established through competition such that the amount of goods or services sought by buyers is equal to the amount of goods or services produced by sellers. This price is often called the competitive price or market clearing price and will tend not to change unless demand or supply changes, and the quantity is called the "competitive quantity" or market clearing quantity. However, the concept of equilibrium in economics also applies to imperfectly competitive markets, where it takes the form of a Nash equilibrium.
economic growth
An increase in the inflation-adjusted market value of the goods and services produced by an economy over time. It is conventionally measured as the percent rate of increase in real gross domestic product, or real GDP.
economic indicator
Any measurable unit of the economy which helps economists assess the past or make predictions about the future, such as unemployment rate and gross domestic product.
economic interdependence
The existence of necessary relationships between different sectors of the economy and how the decisions and actions of one will impact the others.
economic methodology
The study of methods, especially the scientific method, in relation to economics, including principles underlying economic reasoning.
economic model
A theoretical construct representing an economic process by a set of variables and a set of logical and/or quantitative relationships between them. Economic models are usually simplified, often mathematical, frameworks designed to illustrate complex processes. Frequently, economic models posit structural parameters. A model may have various exogenous variables, and those variables may change to create various responses by economic variables. Methodological uses of models include investigation, theorizing, and fitting theories to the world.
economic rent

Any monies collected by a firm above and beyond what is required to keep an entrepreneur owner interested in continuing in business.
economic sector
A category of economic activity.
economic security

The condition of having stable income or other resources to support a standard of living now and in the foreseeable future. It includes probable continued solvency, predictability of the future cash flow of a person or other Economic Entity, such as a country, and employment security or job security.
economic shortage

A situation in which the demand for a particular good or service exceeds its supply within a particular market. A shortage is the opposite of a surplus.
economic surplus

A situation in which the supply of a good or service exceeds its demand within a particular market, often as a result of the current price being below the economic equilibrium.
economic system

A system of production, resource allocation, and distribution of goods and services within a society or a given geographic area. It includes the combination of the various institutions, agencies, entities, decision-making processes, and patterns of consumption that comprise the economic structure of a given community. As such, an economic system is a type of social system. The mode of production is a related concept. All economic systems have three basic questions to ask: what to produce, how to produce it, and in what quantities and who receives the output of production.
economics
The social science that studies the production, distribution, and consumption of goods and services within economies.
economies of agglomeration

The major subfield of urban economics which explains how urban agglomeration occurs in locations where cost savings can naturally arise. This term is most often discussed in terms of economic firm productivity. However, agglomeration effects also explain some social phenomenon, such as large proportions of the population being clustered in cities and major urban centres.
economies of scale
The cost advantages that enterprises obtain as a result of the increased efficiency offered by a certain scale of operation (typically measured by amount of output produced), with cost per unit of output decreasing with increasing scale. At the basis of economies of scale there may be technical, statistical, organizational, or related factors to the degree of market control.
economies of scope
The cost advantages that enterprises obtain as a result of the increased efficiency offered by variety rather than by volume, with cost per unit of output decreasing with increasing variety. In economics, "scope" is synonymous with broadening production through diversified products. For example, a gas station that sells gasoline can also sell soda, milk, baked goods, etc. through their customer service representatives, which may make the sale of gasoline more efficient.
economist
A practitioner in the discipline of economics.
economy
An area of the production, distribution, trade, and consumption of goods and services by different agents. In its broadest sense, an economy may be defined as "a social domain that emphasizes the practices, discourses, and material expressions associated with the production, use, and management of resources".
Edgeworth box

A graphical representation of a market with just two commodities, X and Y, and two consumers. The dimensions of the box are the total quantities Ω_{x} and Ω_{y} of the two goods.
Edgeworth paradox
A situation in which two players cannot reach a state of equilibrium with pure strategies, i.e. each charging a stable price. It was proposed to solve the Bertrand paradox.
Edgeworth's limit theorem
A theorem stating that the core of an economy shrinks to the set of Walrasian equilibria as the number of agents increases to infinity. That is, among all possible outcomes which may result from free market exchange or barter between groups of people, while the precise location of the final settlement (the ultimate division of goods) between the parties is not uniquely determined, as the number of traders increases, the set of all possible final settlements converges to the set of Walrasian equilibria.
effective demand (ED)
The demand for a product or service which occurs when purchasers are constrained in a different market.
efficiency dividend
An annual reduction in resources available to an organization. It is usually applied as a percentage of operational (running) costs.
efficiency wage

Originally referred to the wage per efficiency unit of labor. Marshallian efficiency wages are those calculated with efficiency or ability exerted being the unit of measure rather than time. Today, efficiency wage refers to the idea that higher wages may increase the efficiency of the workers by various channels, making it worthwhile for the employers to offer wages that exceed a market-clearing level.
efficient envy-free division

A division of resources among agents that is both Pareto efficient (PE) and envy-free (EF).
efficient market hypothesis (EMH)

A hypothesis that states that asset prices reflect all available information. A direct implication is that it is impossible to "beat the market" consistently on a risk-adjusted basis since market prices should only react to new information.
elastic demand
Demand that is sensitive to changes in price, such that changes in price have a relatively large effect on the quantity of the good demanded. Contrast inelastic demand.
elasticity
The measurement of the proportional change of an economic variable in response to a change in another. Colloquially, elasticity is often interpreted as how easy it is for a supplier or consumer to change their behavior and substitute another good, the strength of an incentive over choices per the relative opportunity cost.
elasticity of complementarity
Measures the sensitivity of relative factor prices to a change in relative inputs.
elasticity of intertemporal substitution (EIS)

Measures the sensitivity of the growth rate of consumption to the real interest rate.
elasticity of substitution
Measures the sensitivity of the relative use of two goods to a change in their relative prices.
electronic funds transfer (EFT)
The digital transfer of money from one bank account to another, usually through computer-based systems, without the involvement of bank staff.
Elliott wave principle

A form of technical analysis that financial traders use to analyze financial market cycles and forecast market trends by identifying extremes in investor psychology and price levels, such as highs and lows, by looking for patterns in prices.
Ellsberg paradox

A paradox in which people's decisions are inconsistent with subjective expected utility theory. It is generally taken to be evidence of ambiguity aversion, in which a person tends to prefer choices with quantifiable risks over those with unknown, incalculable risks.
employee benefits
Any forms of compensation to an employee in addition to wages or salary for example, parental leave and vacation pay.
endogenous growth theory
A theory that economic growth is primarily the result of endogenous and not external forces. Endogenous growth theory holds that investment in human capital, innovation, and knowledge are significant contributors to economic growth. The theory also focuses on positive externalities and spillover effects of a knowledge-based economy which will lead to economic development.
endogenous variable
A variable whose measure is determined by the model.
energy modeling
The process of building computer models of energy systems in order to analyze them.
Engel curve
Describes how household expenditure on a particular good or service varies with household income.
engineering economics
Previously known as engineering economy, is a subset of economics concerned with the use and "...application of economic principles" in the analysis of engineering decisions.
entrepreneurship
The efforts by a person, known as an entrepreneur, in organizing resources for the creation of something new or taking risks to create new innovations and production.
envelope theorem
A major result about the differentiability properties of the value function of a parameterized optimization problem. As we change parameters of the objective, the envelope theorem shows that, in a certain sense, changes in the decision variable(s) of the objective do not contribute to the change in the objective function.
environmental economics
A sub-field of economics concerned particularly with environmental issues.
equal opportunity
A state of fairness in which job applicants are treated similarly, unhampered by artificial barriers or prejudices or preferences, except when particular distinctions can be explicitly justified.
equilibrium
The point at which quantity demanded and quantity supplied are equal and both consumer and producer are satisfied.
equilibrium price
The market price at which both the supplier and consumer will trade and both are satisfied.
equity

The concept or idea of fairness in economics, particularly in regard to taxation or welfare economics. More specifically, it may refer to equal life chances regardless of identity, to provide all citizens with a basic and equal minimum of income, goods, and services or to increase funds and commitment for redistribution.
equity home bias puzzle
The fact that individuals and institutions in most countries hold only modest amounts of foreign equity, and tend to strongly favor company stock from their home nation. This finding is regarded as puzzling, since ample evidence shows equity portfolios obtain substantial benefits from diversification into global stocks.
equity premium puzzle
The inability of an important class of economic models to explain the average equity risk premium provided by a diversified portfolio of equities over that of government bonds, which has been observed for more than 100 years.
ergodicity economics
A research programme aimed at reworking the theoretical foundations of economics around the concept of ergodicity. The programme's main goal is to understand how traditional economic theory, framed in terms of the expectation values, changes when replacing expectation value with time averages.
Eurosclerosis
A pattern of high unemployment and slow job creation in Europe during the 1970s and 1980s that may have resulted from government over-regulation and overly generous social benefits policies.
excess burden of taxation
The economic loss that society suffers as a result of the distortions caused by taxes or subsidies.
excess supply

A situation in which the quantity of a good or service supplied is more than the quantity demanded, and the price is above the equilibrium level determined by supply and demand; that is, the quantity of the product that producers wish to sell exceeds the quantity that potential buyers are willing to buy at the prevailing price. It is the opposite of an economic shortage.
exchange rate
The rate at which one currency is exchanged for another. It is also commonly regarded as the value of one country's currency relative to another currency.
exchange rate regime
Any method a monetary authority of a country or currency union may use to manage the currency in relation to other currencies and the foreign exchange market.
exchange-traded fund
A group of securities that are traded in an exchange market.
excludability
The degree to which a good, service, or resource can be limited to only paying customers, or conversely, the degree to which a supplier, producer, or other managing body (e.g. a government) can prevent consumption of a good.
exogenous growth model
See Solow-Swan model.
exogenous variable
A variable whose measure is determined outside the model and is imposed on the model.
expected utility hypothesis
A foundational assumption in mathematical economics concerning decision making under uncertainty. It postulates that rational agents maximize utility, meaning the subjective desirability of their actions, choosing between risky prospects by comparing expected utility values (i.e. the weighted sum of adding the respective utility values of payoffs multiplied by their probabilities).
expeditionary economics
An emerging field of economic enquiry that focuses on the rebuilding and reconstructing of economies in post-conflict nations and providing support to disaster-struck nations. It focuses on the need for good economic planning on the part of developed nations to help prevent the creation of failed states. It also emphasizes the need for the structuring on new firms to rebuild national economies.
expenditure function
Any function which gives the minimum amount of money an individual needs to spend to achieve some level of utility, given a utility function and the prices of the available goods.
experimental economics
The application of experimental methods to study economic questions.
externality
A cost or benefit that falls not on the person(s) directly involved in an activity, but on others. Externalities can be positive or negative.
extreme poverty

The most severe type of poverty, defined by the United Nations as "a condition characterized by severe deprivation of basic human needs, including food, safe drinking water, sanitation facilities, health, shelter, education, and information. It depends not only on income but also on access to services".

== F ==
factors of production
Inputs (resources) used to create goods and services, including land, labor, capital, and entrepreneurship.
factor price
The unit cost of using a given factor of production such as labor or capital.
factor price equalization
factor income
The flow of income that is derived from one or more factors of production. For example, rent is the factor income derived from tenants using land, and the wages paid to an individual are a type of factor income generated from the individual's labor.
fair trade
fair trade debate
fascism
Faustmann's formula
federal funds rate target
Federal Open Market Committee (FOMC)
The twelve-member committee of the United States Federal Reserve that meets several times a year to decide the course of action that should be taken to control the money supply of the United States.
Federal Reserve System

The central bank of the United States, created by Congress in 1913 and charged with the duty of regulating the money supply and monitoring its member banks.
Fed model
Fei–Ranis model of economic growth
Feldman–Mahalanobis model
Feldstein–Horioka puzzle
feudalism
fiat money
final good
finance
The study of money and how it is used. Specifically, it deals with the questions of how an individual, company, or government acquires the money needed—called capital in the company context—and how they then spend or invest that money. Finance is often split into three areas: personal finance, corporate finance, and public finance. At the same time, finance is about the overall "system", i.e. the financial markets that allow the flow of money, via investments and other financial instruments, between and within these areas; this "flow" is facilitated by the financial services sector. A major focus within finance is thus investment management—called money management for individuals, and asset management for institutions—and finance then includes the associated activities of securities trading, investment banking, financial engineering, and risk management.
financial deepening
financial economics
financial institution
Any firm, such as a bank, that is in the business of holding money for those who save and lending money to those who need loans.
financial markets
Markets where people trade the property rights to assets (like real estate or stocks) or where savers lend money to borrowers.
financial planning
A series of steps used by a person or a firm to achieve a financial goal.
financial risk
The risk assumed by a saver or investor on future outcomes that involve financial losses and gains.
financial transaction
An agreement or communication carried out between a buyer and a seller to exchange an asset for payment.
financial transaction tax
fiscal conservatism
fiscal multiplier
The ratio of change in national income arising from a change in government spending.
fiscal policy
A government's policy on taxes and spending.
fiscal theory of the price level
Fisher equation
Fisher separation theorem
fixed costs
Costs that have to be paid even if a firm is not producing anything.
foreign exchange market

A global decentralized or over-the-counter market for the trading of currencies. This market determines the foreign exchange rate. It includes all aspects of buying, selling and exchanging currencies at current or determined prices. In terms of trading volume, it is by far the largest market in the world, followed by the credit market.
fractional-reserve banking
framing effect
free good
free market (enterprise)
An economic system in which the prices for goods and services are self-regulated by the open market and by consumers. In a free market, the laws and forces of supply and demand are free from any intervention by a government or other authority and from all forms of economic privilege, monopolies, and artificial scarcities. Proponents of the concept of the free market contrast it with a regulated market in which a government intervenes in supply and demand through various methods such as tariffs used to restrict trade and to protect the local economy. In an idealized free-market economy, prices for goods and services are set freely by the forces of supply and demand and are allowed to reach their point of equilibrium without intervention by government policy.
free-rider problem
free trade
Trade between countries that occurs with few or no trade barriers.
Freiburg school
freshwater economics
frictional unemployment
Unemployment that is a result of workers moving from one job to another, as opposed to structural unemployment.
Friedman rule
Friedman's k-percent rule
Frisch–Waugh–Lovell theorem
full employment
full employment output (Y*)
How much output is produced in the economy when full employment exists in the labor market.
full-reserve banking
functions of money
The four classic functions or uses of money as summarized by William Stanley Jevons in 1875: a medium of exchange, a common measure of value (or unit of account), a standard of value (or standard of deferred payment), and a store of value. This analysis later became a fundamental concept of macroeconomics. Most modern textbooks now list only three functions, that of medium of exchange, unit of account, and store of value, not considering a standard of deferred payment as a distinguished function, but rather subsuming it in the others.
fundamental theorems of asset pricing
fundamental theorems of welfare economics
future value

== G ==
gains from trade
Gale–Shapley algorithm
Galor–Zeira model
Gandhian economics
GDP deflator
general equilibrium theory
Georgism
Gerschenkron effect
Gibbard–Satterthwaite theorem
Gibbard's theorem
Gibrat's law
Gibson's paradox
Giffen good
gift economy
Gini coefficient
global labor arbitrage
gold standard
good
Goodhart's law
Goodwin model
Gorman polar form
Gossen's 1st law
Gossen's 2nd law
Gossen's 3rd law
government revenue
The total revenue received by all three levels of government (federal, state, and local) in the form of taxes and tariffs.
government spending
The total expenditure made by all three levels of government (federal, state, and local) for public services.
grand supercycle
great moderation
Green economy
Green paradox
Greenwood–Hercowitz–Huffman preferences
Gresham's law
Grinold and Kroner Model
Grosch's law
gross domestic product (GDP)
The value of all goods and services produced in the economy in a given period of time, usually a quarter or a year.
gross income
All sources of total income before any deductions or taxes are withdrawn.
gross national income (GNI)
gross private domestic investment
Grossman model of health demand
growth recession
A situation in which economic growth is slow but not low enough to be a recession, yet unemployment still increases.
guns versus butter model

== H ==
Happiness economics
Theoretical, qualitative and quantitative study of happiness and quality of life, including positive and negative affects, well-being, life satisfaction and related concepts.
Harrington paradox
Harris–Todaro model
Harrod–Domar model
Hauser's law
health economics
health insurance
A contracted program where the person insured receives payment for health services when needed in return for a monthly premium payment. Firms may offer some payment of premiums to their employees as part of a benefits package.
Heckscher–Ohlin model
Heckscher–Ohlin theorem
hedonic index
hedonic regression
Henry George theorem
Herfindahl–Hirschman index
heterodox economics
Any economic school of thought or theory that contrasts with mainstream economics.
Hicksian demand function
hiding hand principle
Hindu rate of growth
Hirschman cycle
historical school
history of economic thought
The study of the history of the philosophies of the different thinkers and theories in the subject known today as economics, from ancient economic thought to contemporary economic thought.
Hodrick–Prescott filter
Holmström's theorem
home bias in trade puzzle
home bias puzzle
homo economicus
Hotelling's law
Hotelling's lemma
hourglass economy
household
The sector of the economy which purchases goods from the product market and sells labor, land, and entrepreneurship ability to the factor market in the circular flow market.
housing starts
The number of new houses being built during a period of time.
Huff model
human capital
The knowledge and skills that people use to help them produce output.
human capital flight
humanistic economics
hyperinflation
Inflation which occurs at an extremely high rate, usually in excess of 20 or 30 per cent per month.

== I ==
Icarus paradox
immiserizing growth
implicit cost
import
import substitution industrialization
import quota
impossible trinity
imputation
Inada conditions
incentive
income
income distribution
income effect
The change in consumption resulting from a change in income.
income elasticity of demand (YED)
Measures the sensitivity of a good's demand to income.
Income tax
A tax levied on income, weather being on an individual or a business.
increasing returns
A situation where each additional amount of a resource used in a production process brings forth successively larger amounts of output.
indifference curve
Indigo Era
indirect inference
Individual Retirement Account (IRA)
A retirement (savings) instrument that allows a person to save money through time while deferring taxes on that income until retirement.
induced consumption
induced demand
industrial organization
industry
A sector of the economy in which different firms produce similar or identical goods or services.
inelastic demand
Demand that is not very sensitive to changes in price, such that changes in price have a relatively small effect on the quantity of the good demanded. Contrast elastic demand.
inferior good
inflation
When the overall level of prices in the economy is rising.
inflationism
inflation rate
A measure of how the overall level of prices in the economy changes over time. If the inflation rate is positive, prices are rising; if the inflation rate is negative, prices are falling.
inflation targeting
information asymmetry
information economics
input–output model
installment credit
A loan that offers a borrower a fixed, amount of money over a specified period of time. This way, the borrower knows upfront the number of monthly payments, or "installments," they will need to make and how much each monthly payment will be for the life of the loan.
institutional complementarity
institutional economics
An approach to economics which focuses on the roles of sociocultural evolution and institutions in shaping economic behavior.
insurance
A contracted agreement for an exchange of money for a guarantee of compensation at the time of a loss, damage, illness, or death.
insurance co-pay
A fixed amount paid by an insured individual for a healthcare service.
insurance deductible
The amount paid by the insured individual before any payment is made by the insurer.
insurance policy limit
The maximum or total amount an insurer will pay for losses or damages to assets or health services to people.
intensity of preference
interest
interest rate
The price you have to pay to borrow money.
interest rate parity
intermediate consumption
international economics
international futures
international trade
intertemporal choice
intertemporal equilibrium
intra-industry trade
inventory bounce
investment
Any increase in the economy's stock of capital.
investment fund
invisible hand
Adam Smith's famous idea that when constrained by competition, each firm's greed causes it to act in a socially optimal way, as if guided to do the right thing by an invisible hand.
IS–LM model
IS/MP model
isoquant

== J ==
Jaimovich–Rebelo preferences
JEL classification codes
Jevons paradox
Joan Robinson's growth model
job demands-resources model
job hunting
joint product pricing
Jones model
Juglar cycle
just price
A theory of ethics which attempts to set standards of fairness for economic transactions.

== K ==
Kaldor–Hicks efficiency
Kaldor's facts
Kaldor's growth laws
Kaldor's growth model
Keynes effect
Keynesian beauty contest
Keynesian cross
Keynesian economics

A diverse set of macroeconomic theories about how in the short run (and especially during recessions) economic output can be strongly influenced by the total amount of spending that occurs within an economy, known as aggregate demand. Keynesian economists generally argue that because aggregate demand is often unstable and behaves erratically, it does not necessarily or predictably equal the aggregate supply, which can cause market economies to experience inefficient macroeconomic outcomes in the form of recessions (when demand is low) and inflation (when demand is high), and that these outcomes can be mitigated by monetary policy actions by a central bank and fiscal policy actions by a government authority, which can help stabilize output over the business cycle.
Keynes–Ramsey rule
Keynes's theory of wages and prices
Khazzoom–Brookes postulate
King–Plosser–Rebelo preferences
Kitchin cycle
Kiyotaki–Moore model
Knightian uncertainty
A lack of any quantifiable knowledge about some possible occurrence, as opposed to the presence of quantifiable risk (e.g., that in statistical noise or a parameter's confidence interval). The concept acknowledges some fundamental degree of ignorance, a limit to knowledge, and an essential unpredictability of future events.
knowledge spillover
Kondratiev wave
Kraków school
Kuhn's theorem
Kuznets curve
Kuznets swing

== L ==
labor
People's physical and mental talents and efforts that are used to help produce goods and services. Wage earners usually get paid a set amount of money per hour.
labor economics
labor rights
labor theory of value
Laffer curve
laissez-faire
Lange model
Lausanne school
law of demand
An economic rule stating that quantity demanded and price move in opposite directions, i.e. as demand increases, price decreases, and vice versa.
law of diminishing marginal utility
An economic rule stating that the additional satisfaction a consumer gets from purchasing one more unit of a product will decrease with each additional unit purchased.
law of increasing costs
law of supply
leakage
leakage effect
leapfrogging
lease
Lehman wave
lemon market
lending
Leontief paradox
Leontief production function
Leontief utilities
leprechaun economics
Distortion of national accounts data by corporate tax schemes.
Lerman ratio
Lerner index
An index ranging from 0 to 1 that measures a firm's market power given the price it sets and its marginal cost.
Lerner paradox
Lerner symmetry theorem
Lewis–Mogridge position
liability
Financial responsibility for something.
liberal paradox
limit price
loan
local multiplier effect

The additional economic benefit accrued to a geographic area from money being spent in the local economy.
local tax
Any tax paid to a city or county, e.g. sales taxes, school taxes, or property taxes.
location model
long run
long-run shutdown condition
A situation where a firm's total revenues exceed its variable costs but are less than its total costs. The firm continues to operate until its fixed cost contracts expire.
long-term financing
LoopCo
loose money policy
A monetary policy that makes credit inexpensive and abundant, possibly leading to inflation.
Lorenz curve
loss aversion
Lucas critique
Lucas paradox
Lundberg lag
luxury good

== M ==
macroeconomic model
macroeconomic policy instruments
macroeconomic populism
macroeconomic regulation and control
macroeconomics
The study of the economy as a whole, concentrating on economy-wide factors such as interest rates, inflation, and unemployment. Macroeconomics also encompasses the study of economic growth and how governments use monetary and fiscal policy to try to moderate the harm caused by recessions.
mainstream economics

The body of knowledge, theories, and models of economics, as taught by universities worldwide, that are generally accepted by economists as a basis for discussion. Contrast heterodox economics.
major trading partner
In international trading, a country or group of countries with which one country trades more than with others.
Malthusian growth model
Malthusianism
managerial economics
Mandeville's paradox
manorialism
Marchetti's constant
marginal cost
The additional increase in total cost when one more unit of output is produced.
marginal efficiency of capital
marginalism
marginal product of capital
marginal product of labor
marginal propensity to consume
marginal propensity to import
marginal propensity to save
marginal rate of substitution
marginal rate of technical substitution
marginal revenue
The additional income earned from selling one more unit of a good; sometimes equal to price.
marginal utility
The change in total utility that results from consuming the next unit of a good or service. Marginal utility can be positive or negative.
marginal value
market
market basket
A bundle of goods and services selected to measure inflation. Economists define a market basket, such as the Consumer Price Index, and then track how much money it takes to buy this basket from one period to the next.
market economy
An economy in which almost all economic activity happens in markets, with little or no interference by the government; often referred to as a laissez-faire ("leave alone") economic system.
market failures
Situations where markets deliver socially non-optimal outcomes. Two common causes of market failure are asymmetric information and public goods.
market structure
The structure of a market as a whole, taking into consideration two main factors: the number of firms in the market and whether goods offered are identical, similar, or differentiated.
market production
Term that economists use to capture what happens when one individual offers to make or sell something to another individual at a price agreeable to both.
market system
markets
Places where buyers and sellers come together to trade money for a good or service.
Marshallian demand function
Marxian economics
Master's Degree
A postgraduate academic degree completed after a bachelor's degree in which the student studies a specific topic of their choice. It is usually awarded by a research university after the completion of its program requirements, normally two more years.
Matthew effect
Mayfield's paradox
Meade Conflict
medium of exchange
mental accounting
menu cost
mercantilism
merger simulation
Metcalfe's law
Methodenstreit

A controversy in economic methodology between economists of the Austrian School and those of the Historical School that commenced in the 1880s and persisted for more than a decade.
Metzler paradox
microeconomics
A branch of economics that studies individual people and individual businesses. For people, microeconomics studies how they behave when faced with decisions about where to spend their money or how to invest their savings. For businesses, it studies how profit-maximising firms behave individually, as well as when competing against each other in markets.
Mincer earnings function
minimum wage
Minsky moment
missing market
mixed economy
An economic system blending elements of a market economy with elements of a planned economy, free markets with state interventionism, or private enterprise with public enterprise.
mobile payment
Mobile payments are payments made via the use of a mobile device, such as a smartphone or tablet, to pay for goods, services, or bills. Mobile payments can be made remotely or near, meaning the customer's device is in the same location as the merchant's point of sale (POS).
modern monetary theory
modern portfolio theory
modified gross national income
Modigliani–Miller theorem
monetarism
A school of thought in monetary economics which emphasizes the role of governments in controlling the amount of money in circulation (the money supply). Monetarists assert that variations in the money supply have major influences on national output in the short run and on price levels over longer periods, and that the objectives of monetary policy are best met by targeting the growth rate of the money supply rather than by engaging in discretionary policy.
monetary circuit theory
monetary-disequilibrium theory
monetary economics
monetary/fiscal debate
monetary policy
Using changes in the money supply to change interest rates to stimulate or slow down economic activity.
monetary reform
monetary system
money
Anything customarily used as a medium of exchange, a unit of accounting, and a store of value.
money illusion
money market account (MMA)
A savings account that earns interest and that has some checking account features.
money multiplier
money supply
MONIAC
monopolistic competition
A situation in which many firms with slightly different products compete. Production costs are above what may be achieved by perfectly competitive firms, but society benefits from the product differentiation.
monopoly
A firm with no competitors in its industry. A monopoly firm produces less output, has higher costs, and sells its output for a higher price than it would if constrained by competition.
monopsony
moral hazard
mortgage
motivation
moving equilibrium theorem
multiplier
multiplier uncertainty
Any lack of perfect knowledge of the multiplier effect of a particular policy action, such as a monetary or fiscal policy change, upon the intended target of the policy.
Mundell–Fleming model
mutual fund
mutual fund separation theorem
mutualism

== N ==
Nakamura number
Nash equilibrium
national average salary
national income and product accounts
national income policy agreement
national tax
Any tax paid to a national or federal government, e.g. income tax, tariffs, and social security taxes.
national wealth
The total value of capital and private property that is owned within a country.
natural monopoly
An industry in which one large producer can produce output at a lower cost than many small producers. It undersells its rivals and ends up as the only firm surviving in its industry.
natural resource economics
need
Any good or service that is fundamentally necessary for survival, such as food, clothing, and shelter.
Neoclassical economics
Neoclassical synthesis
Neoliberalism
Neo-Ricardianism
Neo-Schumpeterian economics
net income
The income amount that is left over after all deductions and income taxes are withdrawn.
net national income
net national product
net premium valuation
An actuarial calculation, used to place a value on the liabilities of a life insurer.
network effect
New Keynesian economics
new trade theory (NTT)
nominal interest rates
Interest rates that measure the returns to a loan in terms of money borrowed and money returned (as opposed to real interest rates).
nominal prices
Money prices, which can change over time due to inflation. (See also real prices.)
nominal wages
Wages measured in money. (See also real wages.)
non-convexity
non-price determinant of demand
Any reason other than price that changes the will to buy a good or service, for example, fads, income, taste, future expectation, and population.
non-price determinant of supply
Any reason other than price that changes the will to produce a good or service, for example, changes in taxes and input costs, price of substitutes, future expectations, and changes in technology.
non-rivalry
normal good
normative economics
The part of economics that deals with normative statements, i.e., statements expressing a value judgment about the desirability of a situation. As opposed to positive economics.
North–South model
Norwegian paradox
no-trade theorem

== O ==
occupational choice model
occupational licensing
Okun's law
Okishio's theorem
oligopoly
An industry with only a few firms. If these firms collude, they form a cartel, which may reduce output and drive up profits in the same way a monopoly does.
oligopsony
one-commodity country
A country that mostly produces and exports only one commodity.
Open Energy Modelling Initiative
open energy system models
open-market operations
The buying and selling of government bonds by a central bank; that is, transactions that take place in the public, or open, bond market.
open music model
opportunity cost
The value of the next best alternative thing that could have been done. It measures what is given up to do the most preferred thing.
ordinary good
organizational economics
Ostrom's law
overheating
overlapping generations model
overshooting model
overtaking criterion

== P ==
Paasche price index
A price index method which measures the amount of money at current-year prices that an individual requires to purchase a current-year bundle of goods and services divided by the cost of purchasing that same bundle in a base year.
Pacman conjecture
parable of the broken window
paradox of competition
paradox of flexibility
paradox of prosperity
paradox of thrift
paradox of toil
paradox of value
parallel economic model
parental dividend
Pareto efficiency

In welfare economics, a situation if all possible Pareto improvements have already been made; in other words, there are no longer any ways left to make one person better-off, without making some other person worse-off.
Pareto principle
participation
participatory economics
partnership
A business that two or more individuals own and operate together.
pay check stub (statement)
An itemization of income, taxes withheld, benefits payments (if any), and other information that are presented to an employee of a firm every time they are paid.
pay-day lending
A relatively small amount of money lent at a high rate of interest on the agreement that it will be repaid when the borrower receives their next paycheck.
Peltzman effect
penetration pricing
per capita
A unit of account per person, usually placed at the end of an economic indicator.
perfect competition
A situation where numerous small firms producing identical products compete against each other in a given industry. Perfect competition leads to firms producing the socially optimal output level at the minimum possible cost per unit.
personal property
Possessions such as jewelry, furniture, and real estate that people can amass through time.
Phillips curve
physical capital
All human-made goods that are used to produce other goods and services, such as tools, machines, and buildings.
physiocracy
Pigou effect
Pigouvian tax
Polak model
policy mix
policy-ineffectiveness proposition
polytomous choice
population economics
See demographic economics.
Pork cycle
positive economics
The part of economics that deals with positive statements, i.e., statements concerning what "is," "was," or "will be," excluding statements of what is, was, or will be moral. As opposed to normative economics.
post-Keynesian economics
PPP puzzle
Prebisch–Singer hypothesis
predatory lending
Predatory lending is a practice that involves deception, fraud, or aggressive sales tactics to lead a borrower into a loan that is not what they expected. The goal is to make it difficult for the borrower to repay debt, often resulting in the borrower paying too much in fees and/or interest.
preference
premium of insurance
The dollar price for acquiring an insurance policy.
price
The amount of money it takes to buy a product or produce a product.
price ceiling
A market intervention in which the government ensures that the price of a good or service stays below the free market price.
price controls
price discrimination
price elasticity of demand (PED)
Measures the sensitivity of a good's demand to its price.
price elasticity of supply (PES)
Measures the sensitivity of a good's supply to its price.
price floor
A market intervention in which the government keeps the price of a good or service above its free-market price.
price index
A normalized average of price relatives for a given class of goods or services in a given region and during a given period of time. It is a statistic designed to help to compare how these price relatives, taken as a whole, differ between geographical locations or time periods. Notable price indices include consumer price index, producer price index, and GDP deflator.
price level
price point
price–specie flow mechanism
price war
pricing
pricing science
The application of social and business science methods to the problem of setting prices.
primary economic activity
An economic activity which is focused on the extraction of natural resources of the earth.
prime rate

The interest rate at which a bank will agree to lend to customers with good credit. Floating interest rates are often expressed as a percentage above or below the prime rate.
principal–agent problem
principle of effective demand
private good

An item that yields positive benefits to people that is excludable, i.e. its owners can prevent others from using the good or consuming its benefits. A private good, as an economic resource is scarce, which can cause competition for it.
producer
An entity, either a person or firm, which supplies goods or services.
producer price index
producer surplus
The gain that producers receive when they can sell their output at a price higher than the minimum amount for which they are willing to make it.
product differentiation
product market
In the circular flow model, the sector which facilitates goods and output from firms to households in return for revenue and profit.
production
production possibilities curve
A graph showing the maximal combinations of goods and services that can be produced from a fixed amount of resources in a given period of time.
productive efficiency
A term describing firms that produce goods and services at the lowest possible cost.
productivism
productivity paradox
production set
Proebsting's paradox
profit
profit motive
progressive tax
A tax schedule that states that the more income one earns, the higher the tax rate will be.
property tax
A tax levied on a property which is usually based on its value or a transfer of ownership.
proportional tax

A tax schedule that states that regardless of income, the same tax rate will be applied to all income earners.
prospect theory
proxemics
public bad
public choice
public economics
Or economics of the public sector, is the study of government policy through the lens of economic efficiency and equity. Public economics builds on the theory of welfare economics and is ultimately used as a tool to improve social welfare.
public good
Goods or services that cannot be profitably produced by private firms because they are impossible to provide to just one person; if you provide them to one person, you have to provide them to everybody. Public goods non-excludable (you can't prevent anyone from consuming them) and non-rival (it costs no extra to supply one extra person).
pure competition
purchasing power
The value of the sum of money and the ability of buying products with that money.
purchasing power parity (PPP)

== Q ==
quantitative easing (QE)
quantity demanded
The amount of a good or service that a consumer is able and willing to purchase at a given price based on their income and preferences.
quantity supplied
The amount of a good or service that a supplier is able and willing to produce at a given market price.
quantity theory of money
The theory that the overall level of prices in the economy is proportional to the quantity of money circulating in the economy.
quaternary economic activity
Economic activity that is focused on management, information processing, or research.
quota
A limited quantity of a product that can be produced, imported, or exported.

== R ==
Rabin fairness
Ragnar Nurkse's balanced growth theory
Rahn curve
Ramsey problem
Ramsey–Cass–Koopmans model
rate of profit
rate of return pricing
rational choice
The idea of making choices by using logic and that people will choose the most beneficial of the options afforded.
rational choice institutionalism
rational choice theory
rational expectations
The theory that people optimally change their behaviour in response to policy changes. Depending on the situation, their behavioural changes can greatly limit the effectiveness of policy changes.
rational pricing
rationing
Reaganomics
real business-cycle theory
real income effect
The change in consumption resulting from a change in income, adjusted for inflation.
real interest rates
Interest rates that compensate for inflation by measuring the returns to a loan in terms of units of stuff lent and units of stuff returned (as opposed to nominal interest rates).
real GDP
Gross domestic product that has been adjusted for inflation by applying the price deflator.
real prices
How much of one kind of thing (such as hours worked) you have to give up to get a good or service, no matter what happens to nominal prices.
real wages
Wages measured not in terms of money itself (as nominal wages are) but rather in terms of how much output that money can buy.
rebound effect
recessions
Part of the business cycle during which an economy's total output falls.
recoveries
Part of the business cycle during which an economy's total output expands.
reflation
regenerative economic theory
regional science
regressive tax
A tax schedule that states that the more income one earns, the lower the tax burden.
regulation
Government restrictions on a business firm.
relative price
rent
The price for borrowing real estate. This can be residential or commercial for example, an apartment or office building.
repugnancy costs
repugnant market
resource
resource curse
resource depletion
resource market
(Also known as a factor market.) In the circular flow model, the sector which facilitates resources from household to firms in return for income payment.
retail sales
Purchases of finished goods and services by households and firms.
returns to scale
revealed comparative advantage
revealed preference
revenue
Total income from sales of output.
Revolving Credit
Revolving credit is a line of credit that remains available over time, even if the balance is paid in full. Borrowers can access credit up to a certain amount and then have ongoing access to that amount.
Ricardian economics
Ricardian equivalence
Ricardian socialism
rights
right to work law
A state law forbidding labor unions from forcing workers to join and pay union dues.
risk aversion
risk premium
risk-return relationship
The direct relationship between the risk of an investment and its expected return or profit; the higher the risk, the higher the opportunity for gain or loss and vice versa.
rivalry
Robin Hood effect
Robinson Crusoe economy
Robustness
The ability of a financial trading system to remain effective.
Rostovian take-off model
Rostow's stages of growth
Roth 401k
A Roth 401(k) is an employer-sponsored retirement savings account that is funded using after-tax dollars. This means that income tax is paid immediately on the earnings that the employee deducts from each paycheck and deposits into the account. Withdrawals from the account are tax-free upon retirement.
Roy model
Roy's identity
Rybczynski theorem

== S ==
Salamanca school
salary
An income amount paid to an employee of a firm; it is usually a set amount per year.
saltwater economics
saving
saving identity
Say's law
scarcity
Any situation in which people do not have enough resources to satisfy all of their wants. The phenomenon of scarcity is what creates the need for economics.
Schelling's model of segregation
school of economic thought
A group of economists who share or shared a mutual perspective on the way economies function.
Scitovsky paradox
secondary economic activity
Economic activity focused on the production of manufactured goods made from natural resources.
sector
A portion or component of the larger economy, such as households, firms, or the government.
sectoral balances
seigniorage
service
service economy
service recovery paradox
Shephard's lemma
shift work
shock therapy
short run
shortage
short-run shutdown condition
A situation in which a firm's total revenues are less than its variable costs, and the firm is better off shutting down immediately and losing only its fixed costs.
shrinkflation
sick leave
A benefit given to employees of a firm as a condition of employment where an employee can take days off in case they do not feel well.
Sisyphism
Smihula waves
snob effect
A situation where the demand for a certain good by individuals of a higher income level is inversely related to its demand by those of a lower income level.
social behavior
social choice theory
social dividend
social mobility
socialist economics (socialism)
An economic system in which the government owns some of the factors of production including entire industries, for example, the healthcare system of the country.
sociality
social multiplier effect
Any situation when an individual's marginal utility of an action increases because his peers also participate in this action. For example, researchers have shown that people are more likely to exercise when their peers exercise.
socially optimal output level
The output level that maximises the benefits that society can get from its limited supply of resources.
social welfare function
social welfare model
socioeconomics

sole proprietorship
A business owned and operated by one person.
solidarity economy
Solow residual
Solow–Swan model
Sonnenschein–Mantel–Debreu theorem
sovereign wealth fund
stabilization policy
stagflation
A simultaneous economic phenomenon during which inflation and unemployment are both rising.
standard of deferred payment
standard of living
state tax
Any tax paid to a state government, e.g. sales taxes, state income tax, and license plate fees.
steady-state economy
sticky prices
Prices that are slow to adjust to shocks. Price stickiness can cause recessions to linger.
stochastic frontier analysis
stock market
A secondary market where securities, stocks for example, are bought and sold.
stock-flow consistent model
Stockholm School
stocks (corporate stocks)
Shares of ownership of a corporation that entitles the owner to a portion of the profits or dividends.
Stolper–Samuelson theorem
store of value
St. Petersburg paradox
strategic complements
Strauss–Howe generational theory
structural unemployment
Unemployment created due to a decrease in demand for the skills of a worker.
subgame perfect equilibrium
subjective theory of value
subsistence agriculture (subsistence farming)
The growing of just enough food by a family to provide for its own needs. No part of the crop is used to export or to feed an industrial workforce.
substitute good
A product that can satisfy the utility of another.
substitution effect
When consumers react to an increase in a good's price by consuming less of that good and more of other goods.
sunk costs
sunspot
sunspot equilibrium
supply
The total amount of a certain type of good that has been produced and is available.
supply and demand
An economic model of markets that separates buyers from sellers and then summarises each group's behaviour with a single line on a graph. The buyers' behaviour is captured by the demand curve, whereas the sellers' behaviour is captured by the supply curve. By putting these two curves on the same graph, economists can show how buyers and sellers interact in markets to determine how much of any particular item is going to be sold, as well as the price at which it is likely to be sold.
supply chain
supply curve
A line on a graph that represents how much of a good or service sellers are going to produce at various prices.
supply schedule
A chart that lists how much of a good a supplier will offer at different prices.
supply shock
A sudden shortage of a good.
supply-side economics
A theory in macroeconomics which postulates that lowering tax rates, decreasing government regulation, and allowing free trade is the most effective way to foster economic growth because greater supplies of goods and services at lower prices cause employment to increase and consumers to spend more. Contrast demand-side economics.
surplus
A situation in which supply is greater than demand, usually as the result of high prices.

== T ==
tableau économique
tatonnement
tariff

A tax imposed by the government of a country, or by a supranational union of countries or institutions, on imports or exports of goods. Import duties may serve as a source of revenue for the government as well as a form of regulation of foreign trade by taxing foreign products to encourage or safeguard domestic industries that produce the same or similar products. Along with import and export quotas, tariffs are among the most commonly used instruments of protectionism.
tax
tax-benefit model
tax benefits of debt
tax credit
tax deduction
tax rate
taxable income
The amount of income that is subject to being taxed. This amount may or may not be the total gross income of a person or firm.
Taylor rule
technological theory of social production
terms of trade
The rules that countries impose on each other to trade with each other.
tertiary economic activity
Economic activity that is focused on the delivery of services such as healthcare, banking, or tourism.
Thatcherism
theory of the firm
theory of the second best

A theory that concerns the situation when one or more optimality conditions cannot be satisfied. It shows that if one optimality condition in an economic model cannot be satisfied, it is possible that the next-best solution involves changing other variables away from the values that would otherwise be optimal.
thermoeconomics
Thirlwall's Law
throw away paradox
tight money policy
Federal Reserve System actions that contract the growth of the nation's money supply for the purpose of reducing or eliminating inflation.
time preference
time preference theory of interest
time value of money
Topkis's theorem
Törnqvist index

A price or quantity index that measures the weighted geometric mean of the relatives using arithmetic averages of the value shares in two or more periods as weights.
total cost
total surplus
The sum of producer surplus and consumer surplus.
trade

The transfer of goods and services from one person or entity to another.
traditional economy
An economy in which production and distribution are handled along the lines of long-standing cultural traditions.
tragedy of the anticommons
tragedy of the commons
transaction cost
A cost in making any economic trade when participating in a market.
transfer payment
Any redistribution of income and wealth by means of the government making a payment, without goods or services being received in return.
transfer payments multiplier

The multiplier by which aggregate demand will increase when there is an increase in transfer payments (e.g., welfare spending, unemployment payments).
transfer pricing
transformation problem
transport economics
triangle model
Triffin dilemma
trough
Tullock paradox
turnpike model of money
turnpike theory

== U ==
ultimatum game
An asymmetrical, two player game that has become a popular instrument of economic experiments.
underemployment
Working at a job for which one is overqualified, or working part-time when full-time work is desired.
unemployment
Under-use of any factor of production, most commonly referring to labor.
unit of account
U.S. Dollar
The official currency of the United States, usually abbreviated as USD.
unitary elastic
universal bank
universal basic income
unplanned spending
Spending that takes place without prior consideration or budgeting.
unsecured credit
A loan that does not require collateral from the borrower. Instead, lenders approve unsecured loans based on the borrower's creditworthiness.
unskilled labor
Labor that requires no specialized skills, education, or training to perform.
urban economics
utilitarianism
utility
The usefulness of a good or service in satisfying a need or a want.
utility maximization problem
utility representation theorem
Uzawa condition
Uzawa–Lucas model
Uzawa's theorem

== V ==
vacation pay
A benefit to employees by a firm where employees can take time off for leisure. This benefit is usually given in amounts of weeks.
value
A measure of the benefit provided by a good or service to an economic agent.
value-added tax (VAT)
variable costs
Any cost that changes in proportion to the amount of goods or services that a firm produces. Variable costs are also the sum of marginal costs over all units produced.
Veblen good
velocity of money

Refers to how fast money passes from one holder to the next. It can refer to the income velocity of money, which is the frequency with which the average same unit of currency is used to purchase newly domestically produced goods and services within a given time period. In other words, it is the number of times one unit of money is spent to buy goods and services per unit time.
Verdoorn's law
Virginia school
Von Neumann–Morgenstern utility theorem

== W ==
wage
The monetary compensation (or remuneration, personnel expenses, labor) paid by an employer to an employee in exchange for work done. Payment is typically calculated as a fixed amount for each task completed (a task wage or piece rate), or at an hourly or daily rate (wage labour), or based on some other easily measured quantity of work done.
wage labour
wage slavery
Wagner's law
Walras's law
want
Wants are often distinguished from needs. A need is something that is necessary for survival (such as food and shelter), whereas a want is simply something that a person would like to have. Some economists have rejected this distinction and maintain that all of these are simply wants, with varying levels of importance. By this viewpoint, wants and needs can be understood as examples of the overall concept of demand.
wealth
The abundance of valuable financial assets or physical possessions which can be converted into a form that can be used for transactions. This includes the core meaning as held in the originating old English word weal, which is from an Indo-European word stem. The modern concept of wealth is of significance in all areas of economics, especially for growth economics and development economics, yet the meaning of wealth is context-dependent. Individuals or companies possessing a substantial net worth are often referred to as wealthy. Net worth is defined as the current value of one's assets less liabilities (excluding the principal in trust accounts).
wealth effect
The change in spending that accompanies a change in perceived wealth. Usually the wealth effect is positive: spending changes in the same direction as perceived wealth.
welfare
A type of government support for the citizens of that society. Welfare may be provided to people of any income level, as with social security (and is then often called a social safety net), but it is usually intended to ensure that people can meet their basic human needs such as food and shelter. Welfare attempts to provide a minimal level of well-being, usually either a free- or a subsidized-supply of certain goods and social services, such as healthcare, education, and vocational training.
welfare cost of business cycles
welfare cost of inflation
welfare economics
A branch of economics that uses microeconomic techniques to evaluate well-being (welfare) at the aggregate (economy-wide) level.
welfare trap
Weller's theorem
willingness to accept (WTA)
The minimum amount of money that а person is willing to accept to abandon a good or to put up with something negative, such as pollution. It is equivalent to the minimum monetary amount required for sale of a good or acquisition of something undesirable to be accepted by an individual.
willingness to pay (WTP)
The maximum price at or below which a consumer will definitely buy one unit of a product. This corresponds to the standard economic view of a consumer reservation price. Some researchers, however, conceptualize WTP as a range.
Wonderland model
workforce productivity
World3
World3 nonrenewable resource sector
Wright's Law

== X ==
x-efficiency
x-inefficiency

== Y ==
yield
In finance, the yield on a security is the amount of cash (in percentage terms) that returns to the owners of the security, in the form of interest or dividends received from it. Normally, it does not include the price variations, distinguishing it from the total return. Yield applies to various stated rates of return on stocks (common and preferred, and convertible), fixed income instruments (bonds, notes, bills, strips, zero coupon), and some other investment type insurance products (e.g. annuities).

== Z ==
Zelder paradox
zero-sum game
In game theory and economic theory, a zero-sum game is a mathematical representation of a situation in which each participant's gain or loss of utility is exactly balanced by the losses or gains of the utility of the other participants. If the total gains of the participants are added up and the total losses are subtracted, they will sum to zero. Thus, cutting a cake, where taking a larger piece reduces the amount of cake available for others as much as it increases the amount available for that taker, is a zero-sum game if all participants value each unit of cake equally (see marginal utility).

== See also ==
- Outline of economics
- Index of economics articles
