= Hourglass economy in Silicon Valley =

Economic phenomenon in California

Economic conditions in Silicon Valley have led to categorization of the region as an hourglass economy, a type of socioeconomic phenomenon that favors the disproportionate growth of the upper and lower classes with comparatively weak development of the middle class. This economy is typically a characteristic of highly developed nations and regions that experience a steady influx of capital, invest heavily in research and development, and have a high cost of living.

Since 2010, median wages for lower-skilled occupations like those in construction, transportation, and service industries have declined in Silicon Valley, while the share of high-income households has risen by nearly 10 percentage points. As of February 2018, nearly a third of households in the region earn less than the self-sufficiency standard, the income needed to cover basic expenses without private or public assistance. Income inequality has been compounded by the rise of housing costs and a shortage of affordable housing in markets such as San Francisco. Recent reports indicate that the homelessness crisis in Silicon Valley is one of the worst in the United States.

The region has drawn national scrutiny from journalists, economists, and the general public for failing to address the widening economic disparities, given that Silicon Valley receives almost half of all venture capital investments in the United States and leads the nation in GDP growth. Advocacy groups like Silicon Valley Rising and Palo Alto Forward have made attempts to propose policy changes on behalf of low-income and historically discriminated populations in the Bay Area.

== Causes ==
Following the 2007–2009 Great Recession, there is evidence to suggest that the middle-class has struggled to recover in Silicon Valley. The region has experienced high levels of job-growth, primarily concentrated in specialized technology sectors. Despite the region's rebound from the recession, "Tier 2" or middle-class jobs have seen a gradual decline in employment, as detailed in the 2015 Silicon Valley Index published by Joint Venture Silicon Valley:

Though we're proliferating high-wage and low-wage jobs, we're steadily losing share in the middle. It's as if the economy has lost its spine, and this has important implications for the kind of community we become.

— Russell Hancock, president and CEO of Joint Venture Silicon Valley

=== Great Recession and subsequent housing crisis ===
With the onset of the Great Recession, which stemmed from a combination of "mass mortgage lending, ballooning home values, and dubious subprime operations", unemployment and foreclosures grew. Many homeowners could not afford to continue home loan payments when interest rates adjusted, leading to the burst of the housing bubble; this was known as the subprime mortgage crisis. Foreclosures left thousands of houses empty, while residential construction was slashed by three quarters from its peak in 2005. According to the California Association of Realtor's report on the state's housing market from 2008 to 2009, "nearly 20% of sellers sold their property due to foreclosure, short sales, or default". Over one million Californians were unemployed, with "construction, real estate, and mortgage finance-related firms" reportedly the hardest hit sectors.

Economists note the example of supply and demand manifest in this housing market crisis: high demand for residence (fueled by localized job growth and foreign investments) places pressure on the supply side of the scale (which continues to recover from the Great Recession's near-halt in construction, and which is regulated by strict building laws that restrain new construction). As of 2018, construction of new residential units had kept pace with job growth in Silicon Valley. Weak infrastructure has been struggling to meet the demands placed upon it, and partially accounts for the inflated home prices and rising cost of living facing most residents of Silicon Valley, particularly those belonging to lower- and middle-income social brackets.

Companies have reported difficulty in finding workers to fill available positions as rising housing costs have resulted in an exodus of individuals from Silicon Valley. 2018 reports placed the median home sale price in Silicon Valley at $935,000. Despite the overall increase in population, a total of 44,102 residents moved out of the Valley to other parts of California and the United States between July 2015 and July 2017, with many citing expensive living costs as the primary reason for their move. Startups and capital have also been migrating to: Seattle, Washington; Austin, Texas; and cities in the Midwest.

=== Uneven job growth ===
The total income for the median family in California fell more than 5% between the official recession years and an additional 6% between 2009 and 2010, producing a greater gap between lower- and upper-income groups. A 2018 report published by Joint Venture Silicon Valley indicated a continuation of this trend: "Employment across all tiers has exceeded pre-recession levels, but growth has been uneven for mid-wage/mid-skill (Tier 2) jobs in both Silicon Valley and San Francisco." The information technology business cluster in Silicon Valley "favors software development firms, startups, and sources of venture capital", therefore the local economy generates jobs centered around specialized skills. Meanwhile, Working Partnerships USA reported that low-wage job growth has increased by nearly 25% in the last 20 years. These jobs were largely concentrated in the sub-contracted sector of high-tech firms, including janitorial services, transportation, and food service, in what has been termed the "invisible workforce of Silicon Valley".

The region has also seen a narrowing number of middle-income households. The 2015 Silicon Valley Index Report depicted a steep 3% decline in middle-income households in Silicon Valley over the course of 2012 to 2013, while the concentration of upper-income households increased by 3%. Employment in middle-wage jobs also experienced a 3% decline over the last decade. The publication's 2018 report indicated a loss of 19,000 households in the "very low-to-moderate-income" range, while gaining over 19,500 high-income households. An American Community Survey reported that since 2007, Silicon Valley has held the second highest concentration of income earners in the top 5%. As of 2013, 15.9% of households in the San Jose-Santa Clara-Sunnyvale-metropolitan area were in the top 5%. Silicon Valley Index 2019 shows that the number of mid-tier jobs has shrunk, signaling a strong relationship between income inequality and [lack of] affordable housing. While the growing demand for housing is unmet, at least a third of residents are exceedingly dependent on some form of assistance.

With income not rising in proportion with the housing costs of Silicon Valley, individuals have migrated to suburbs. Those that haven't moved, typically allocate from 30–50% of their income to housing.

== Effects ==
As the concentration of middle-class families and individuals shrinks in the Silicon Valley region, researchers, city officials, and economists are increasingly concerned about socio-economic consequences. Recent evidence indicating a migration of startups to more affordable cities across the United States has raised questions over a gradual shift in investment and capital flow out of Silicon Valley. Some investors and economists are confident that Silicon Valley has reached its "peak", and is steadily losing its lead over other innovation hubs.

=== Exodus to suburbs, longer commutes ===
Unaffordable living has pushed thousands in the middle-class to outlying suburbs around the Bay Area, while others have moved out-of-state. A 2018 survey published by the Bay Area Council, a regional think-tank, reported that 46% of Bay Area residents plan to move out of their home within the next few years; this number has steadily risen over the past few years. The same study indicated that 61% of survey respondents were looking to move outside of California, with Texas and Oregon as popular alternatives. Redfin's quarterly migration report also indicated this trend for Metro San Francisco, with 21.9% of area users searching for homes elsewhere and 16,952 more home searchers looking to move away than to move to the metro area.

Long commutes are faced by those who work in Silicon Valley but live in the outlying suburbs. Some commute from as far as Stockton, California; as of 2017, 9% of all commuters living in Stockton travel 90 minutes or more to work each day and have joined a population known as "mega-commuters". Silicon Valley commute times as a whole have risen 17% since 2008, with most individuals coming from the suburbs.

=== Growing homeless population ===
In 2017, the U.S. Department of Housing and Urban Development released their annual report detailing homeless levels across the nation; 7,394 individuals experienced homelessness in the San Jose and Santa Clara regions, with another 6,858 homeless in San Francisco. Numerous studies and reports have confirmed that the housing crisis has magnified the homeless population throughout Silicon Valley, and experts are concerned that homes in the Bay Area are simply inaccessible for most of the middle- and lower-class.

=== Shift in capital and innovation flows ===
Silicon Valley is home to one of the largest concentrations of venture capital in the United States, accounting for nearly half of the nation's venture capital investments in 2016, and stands as the 19th largest economy in the world. In recent years, however, American companies and entrepreneurs have begun to eye other locations in the United States as breeding grounds for future innovation. The Midwest, in particular, has attracted the attention of the likes of e-commerce giant Amazon for its second headquarters, and venture capitalists based in Silicon Valley have started to invest in startups in areas of the "Rustic Belt". CEOs and founders that established initial success in Silicon Valley, most notably AOL founder Steve Case and investor/entrepreneur Tim Ferriss, have openly commented on the region "hitting its peak", and spoken of a growing interest in startups outside the Bay Area.
