= Peter O. Steiner =

American economist (1922–2010)

Peter Otto Steiner (July 9, 1922 – June 26, 2010) was an American economist and professor emeritus of economics at the University of Michigan. His research was on a wide range of topics and he published several books including (with Richard G. Lipsey) a standard textbook, and on the Economic Status of the Aged (Jointly with Robert Dorfman) but is perhaps best remembered for his work, also jointly with Dorfman, on advertising. The Dorfman–Steiner theorem carries his name. He also served as president of the American Association of University Professors (AAUP).

He graduated from Oberlin College (BA) and Harvard University (PhD, Economics).

== Selected publications ==
=== Books ===
- Steiner, Peter O. (1975) [1957]. Mergers: Motives, effects, policies. Ann Arbor: University of Michigan Press. ISBN 978-0-472-08799-0.
- Steiner, Peter O.; Dorfman, Robert (1957). The economic status of the aged. University of California Press.
- Steiner, Peter O.; Lipsey, Richard G. (2015) [1966]. Economics. New York: Harper & Row. ISBN 978-0-19-967683-5.
- Steiner, Peter O. (2005) [1996]. Thursday-Night Poker: How to Understand, Enjoy--and Win. Random House Publishing Group. ISBN 978-0-345-48615-8.

=== Journal articles ===
- Steiner, Peter O.; Dorfman, Robert (1954). "Optimal advertising and optimal quality". American Economic Review. 44 (5): 826–836.
- Steiner, Peter O. (1957). "Peak loads and efficient pricing". Quarterly Journal of Economics. 71 (4): 585–610. doi:10.2307/1885712. JSTOR 1885712.
- Steiner, Peter O.; Bergmann, Barbara R.; Poston, Muriel E. (May–June 1998). "Academic freedom and tenure: University of the district of Columbia: Massive terminations of faculty appointments". Academe. 84 (3). American Association of University Professors: 46–55. doi:10.2307/40251266. JSTOR 40251266.
