= Lerman ratio =

The Lerman ratio, named after economist Robert I. Lerman, suggest that a government benefit to the underemployed, such as welfare, will presumably reduce their overall hours of work. The ratio of the actual increase in income compared to the benefit is the Lerman ratio, which is ordinarily between zero and one. Moffitt (1992) estimates it in regard to the Aid to Families with Dependent Children (AFDC) program in the US at about .625.
