= Backward advantage =

Theory of economic development

- Initiator: Alexander Gerschenkron
- Introduced: 1952

Backward advantage
- Simplified Chinese: 后发优势
- Traditional Chinese: 後發優勢
Transcriptions
Standard Mandarin
- Hanyu Pinyin: Hòufā yōushì

The backward advantage (simplified Chinese: 后发优势; traditional Chinese: 後發優勢), or the 'advantage of backwardness', also known as latecomer's advantage, is a notion first formulated by the Russian-American economist Alexander Gerschenkron in 1952. However, there is one who argues that it was the American economist and sociologist Thorstein Veblen who developed the concept of the "advantage of backwardness" in his essay Imperial Germany and the Industrial Revolution, which was published in 1915.

The backward advantage implies that a still-developing country can take advantage of the technology/industry gap with a developed country by implementing a new technology or venturing into an industry that is new to its economy but mature in the developed country. In this case, the innovative costs for still-developing countries will be significantly lower than for developed countries that need to invent or innovate. But when still-developing countries reach a higher stage of development, and when the cost of production factors gradually rises, upgrades are necessary to cope with the rise. Otherwise, these countries will fall into the middle income trap.

Starting from around 2000, economists Yang Xiaokai and Lin Yifu had a famous academic debate about "backward disadvantage" and "backward advantage", and their debate was essentially about whether the economic development of late-developing countries should take the path of institutional imitation or technological imitation.

== See also ==
- Backward disadvantage
- Economic espionage
