= Law of increasing costs =

Economic principle

In economics, the law of increasing costs is a principle that states that to produce an increasing amount of a good a supplier must give up greater and greater amounts of another good. The best way to look at this is to review an example of an economy that only produces two things - cars and oranges. If all the resources of the economy are put into producing only oranges, there will not be any factors of production available to produce cars. So the result is an output of X number of oranges but 0 cars. The reverse is also true - if all the factors of production are used for the production of cars, 0 oranges will be produced. In between these two extremes are situations where some oranges and some cars are produced. There are three assumptions that are made in this possibility. The economy is experiencing full employment (everyone who has to work has a job), the best technology is being used and production efficiency is being maximized. So the question becomes, what is the cost of producing more oranges or cars? If the economy is at the maximum for all inputs, then the cost of each unit will be more expensive. The economy will have to incur more variable costs, such as overtime, to produce the unit.

The law also applies to switching production in a maxed out economy. Essentially, the economy is still producing more, so the law still applies. The only difference is that resources are being taken from one area and applied to another, instead of simply producing more of the same (as assumed in the first paragraph)
