= Wonderland model =

Integrated mathematical model used for studying phenomena in sustainable development

Wonderland is an integrated mathematical model used for studying phenomena in sustainable development. First introduced by economist (Waren C. Sanderson 1994) of Stony Brook University, there are now several related versions of the model in use. Wonderland allows economists, policy analysts and environmentalist to study the interactions between the economic, demographic and anthropogenic sectors of an idealized world, thereby enabling them to obtain insights transferable to the real world.

== Introduction ==
Wonderland is a compact model. In total, there are only four continuous state variables, one each for the economic and demographic sectors and two for the anthropogenic sector; thus making Wonderland more compact and amenable to analysis than larger, more intricate models like World3. For this reason it is often used as an initial testing ground for new techniques in the area of policy analysis (Lempert, et al., 2003).

== Governing equations ==
Denote the four state variables as: $x(t)$ – population, $y(t)$ – per capita output, $z(t)$ – stock of natural capital and $p(t)$ – pollution flow per unit of output. Let $x,y\in[0,\infty)$ and $z,p\in[0,1]$, then the state variables evolve in discrete time, according to the following recurrence relations (Sanderson, 1994).

$$\begin{align}
x(t+1) &= x(t)\left[1+b\Big(y(t),z(t)\Big) - d\Big(y(t),z(t)\Big)\right],\\
y(t+1) &=y(t)\left(1+\gamma-(\gamma+\eta)\Big[1-z(t)\Big]^{\lambda}\right),\\
z(t+1) &= \frac{g\Big(x(t),y(t),z(t),p(t)\Big)}{1+g\Big(x(t),y(t),z(t),p(t)\Big)},\\
p(t+1) &= p(t)(1-\chi),\\
\ &\ \\
\!\!\!\text{where,} \qquad &\ \\
\ &\ \\
b(y,z)&= \beta_0\left[\beta_1 - \left(\frac{e^{\beta y}}{1+e^{\beta y}}\right)\right],\\
d(y,z)&= \alpha_0\left[\alpha_1 - \left(\frac{e^{\alpha y}}{1+e^{\alpha y}}\right)\right]
\left[1+\alpha_2(1-z)^{\theta}\right],\\
g(x,y,z,p)&= \frac{z}{1-z}\,e^{\,\delta z^{\rho}-\omega f(x,y,p)}, \ \text{and}\\
f(x,y,p)&=xyp.
\end{align}$$

Altogether, these equations depend upon 15 parameters.

Sector	Parameter
Economic	$\ \gamma, \ \eta, \ \lambda$
Demographic	$\ \chi, \ \delta, \ \rho, \ \omega$
Anthropogenic	$\ \alpha, \ \alpha_0, \ \alpha_1, \ \alpha_2, \ \beta, \beta_0, \ \beta_1, \ \theta$

$b(y,z)$ and $d(y,z)$ represent the birth rate and death rate respectively. Both saturate as per capita output rises, in agreement with empirical studies (Cohen, 1995).

The form of $f(x,y,p)$ follows from the I = PAT hypothesis.

== System behavior ==
Using the Scenario analysis technique, Sanderson (1994) studied two possible futures for the idealized world described by Wonderland. One future entitled Dream, held out the possibility of unending sustainable growth, while the other termed Horror, ended in environmental collapse and eventual extinction of the population. Subsequent work (Kohring, 2006) showed that the parameters of the model can be bisected into two sets, one which always produces sustainable futures and one which always ends in collapse and extinction. Additionally, the equations of Wonderland exhibit chaotic behavior (Gröller, et al., 1996, Wegenkittl, et al., 1997, Leeves and Herbert, 1998).

== Avoiding collapse ==
In the basic model it is impossible to avoid or recover from the environmental collapse seen in the Horror scenario without changes to the model itself. Two such changes have been studied: pollution abatement and pollution avoidance.

=== Pollution abatement ===
Abating the effects of pollution draws funds from other sources to pay for cleaning up the environment (Sanderson, 1994). This decreases the value of $y$ entering into the equations for birth, $b$, and death, $d$:

$$\begin{align}
y^{\prime}=y-\phi(1-z)^{\mu}y
\end{align}$$

The time evolution of $y(t)$ is unaffected because those goods and services needed for pollution abatement must also be considered part of the overall output. The impact of these changes on the environment is expressed by changes to $f$:

$$\begin{align}
f(x,y,p)=xyp - \kappa\frac{e^{\epsilon \phi(1-z)^{\mu}yx}}{1+e^{\epsilon \phi(1-z)^{\mu}yx}}
\end{align}$$

These changes introduce three new parameters into the model:

Sector	Parameter
Policy Levers	$\ \phi, \ \mu, \ \kappa$

By adjusting the policy levers, it is possible to clean up a polluted environment and recover from the collapse seen in the Horror scenario. However, the recovery is only temporary, after a brief time of robust growth the system again collapses, leading to endless cycles of collapse followed by recovery. Abating pollution does not alter the fundamental division of the parameters into the two sets of sustainable and unsustainable futures (Kohring, 2006).

=== Pollution avoidance ===
Pollution avoidance aims to prevent pollution from entering into the environment, by making its production unprofitable. This is modeled by means of a pollution tax (Herbert and Leeves, 1998, Lempert, et al., 2003):

$$\begin{align}
y(t+1) &= y(t)\left(1+\gamma-\left(\gamma+\eta\right)\Big[1-z(t)\Big]^{\lambda}-\gamma_0\,\frac{\tau}{1-\tau}\right),\\
p(t+1) &= p(t)\left(1-\chi-\chi_0\frac{\tau}{1+\tau}\right).\\
\end{align}$$

The new parameters for the pollution avoidance model are:

Sector	Parameter
Policy Levers	$\ \gamma_0, \ \chi_0, \ \tau$

With these changes, it is possible to raise the tax rate, $\tau$, such that the system never collapses and the horror scenario is avoided altogether. Regardless of the other parameters, it is always possible to increase $\tau$ in order to avoid collapse thereby enabling unending sustainable growth (Kohring, 2006).

== Variations ==
=== Production function ===
Instead of the relatively simple economic growth equation used for $y(t)$ some researchers use a Cobb–Douglas production function instead (Leeves and Herbert, 2002).

=== Multiple countries ===
The standard form of the Wonderland model contains a single, homogeneous entity. Herbert et al. (2005) extended Wonderland to a multi-country model by allowing the different entities to use different sets parameters and assuming the outputs are coupled through trade flows.

=== Differential equations ===
Originally developed in terms of discrete time, finite difference equations, it is often recast as a set of continuous time differential equations (Gröller, et al., 1996)
