= Missing market =

Hypothetical microeconomics situation

A missing market is a situation in microeconomics where a competitive market allowing the exchange of a commodity would be Pareto-efficient, but no such market exists.

== Examples ==
A variety of factors can lead to missing markets:

A classic example of a missing market is the case of an externality like pollution, where decision makers are not responsible for some of the consequences of their actions. When a factory discharges polluted water into a river, that pollution can hurt people who fish in or get their drinking water from the river downstream, but the factory owner may have no incentive to consider those consequences. Hence, there are not enough incentives for the formation of a pollution market.

Coordination failure can also prevent market formation. Again considering the pollution example, downstream residents might seek to be paid by the factory owner who pollute their water, but because of the free rider problem it may be difficult to coordinate.

Another barrier to pollution markets could be technology. If the river has several factories along its banks, it may be difficult or impossible to monitor which factory is responsible for downstream pollution.

High transaction costs might also deter market formation. It may be the case that both sides could benefit from an exchange of goods, but that setting up such an exchange is prohibitively expensive.

Markets can also be missing if there is a failure of trust or information. In non zero-sum interactions, it is possible that the Nash Equilibrium for individuals acting independently will be sub-optimal, in that both parties could benefit from cooperating, but on their own will choose not to. An example could be a shortage in footwear, where one person would like to open a factory to make shoes, and the other would like to produce socks, but because they are complementary commodities, neither has incentive to start producing unless he knows that the other will do the same (see also: prisoner's dilemma). The same applies to alternative automotive fuels: few filling station owners will be interested in offering the fuel until alternate-fuel cars are on the road, but people will not buy alternate-fuel cars until filling stations exist to service them.

== Solutions ==
In many cases of missing markets, it may be possible for the government or another actor to create circumstances that make market exchange possible. In the case of pollution, one popular solution is for the government to assign property rights in order to allow Coase Bargaining. In cases of information failure, futures markets can help to signal willingness to cooperate. An ownership solution is for one party to integrate into both activities, thereby internalizing the benefits, or to use the surplus generated on one side of the market to subsidize transactions on the other (see two sided markets).
