= Domar serfdom model =

The Domar Serfdom Model is a mid-to-late 20th century model that develops a hypothesis concerning the causes of agricultural slavery or serfdom in historical societies. Evsey Domar first presented this model in his 1970 paper, “ The Causes of Slavery or Serfdom: A Hypothesis” published in the Economic History Review. The Domar Serfdom Model revives a hypothesis originally suggested by Russian Historian Vasily Klyuchevsky, who looks at the causes of slavery through the lens of the Russian experience in the 16th and 17th centuries. In his revisiting of the hypothesis, Domar aims to give it wider applicability while focusing more on an analysis that yields an economic model as an explanation of the causes of slavery.

== Assumptions and hypothesis ==
In his model of serfdom, Domar assumes the following:

- Land and labor are the only factors of production (no capital or management required) (Domar, 2)
- Land is of uniform quality and location is a non-factor
- Constant returns in labor (marginal product of labor is constant, and nearly equal to the average product of labor)

In addition, Domar asserts that there are 3 elements of agricultural structure relevant in his model:

1. Abundant free land
2. Abundant free labor (free peasants)
3. Large-scale agriculture (non-working landowners)

Domar claims that any 2 of these 3 elements can exist cohesively, but never can all 3 elements exist simultaneously in any particular situation. Dependent on which elements exist cohesively, one will see differing types of societies. (Domar, 5) The Domar Serfdom Model characterizes bond labor as being a product of human choice and creation. Taking Q=F(Land, Labor), stated in words as production being a function of land and labor, and under the assumptions that production requires only land and labor, production demonstrates constant returns to scale, and there is an abundance of free land, then free-wage labor will not exist. Additionally, production units will require bond labor. It is this attribution of bond labor resulting from human choice that separates Domar's model from models that attribute slavery to a product of nature, such as Staple's Thesis. (Domar, 5)

== Historical Application ==
Domar concentrates the testing of his model on historical analysis of serfdom and slavery in Russia, Poland-Lithuania, Western Europe, and the United States. Domar's analysis of Russia looks at pre-1550, where Russian peasants were free men, and 100 years later, where Russian peasants were serfs. (Domar, 8) Domar states that the relevant factors contributing to this change in classification were the number of servants required by the military and the population density. (Domar, 8) In the second half of the 15th century, the Russian government began distributing land, depopulating the central areas of the country. By the start of the 17th century, a high land/labor ratio was present in addition to the governmental need to create a large class of servants, which caused a large increase in serfdom levels in Russia into the 19th century. (Domar, 11) In Poland-Lithuania, relevant factors leading to the increase in slavery and serfdom started in the 14th century with a conquering of Ukrainian land, leading to a much higher land/labor ratio in the newly expanded region. (Domar, 11-12) In addition, the immigration out of the central areas and into the more peripheral areas of the state led to a more homogenous land/labor ratio throughout the entire state. (Domar, 12) In his analysis of serfdom in Western Europe, Domar suggests that depopulation of the late Rome Empire created a large increase in the land/labor ratio, creating a situation in which the development of serfdom rose as a subsequent effect of an increasing land/labor ratio due to a decreasing population. (Domar, 13) The end of the 13th century in Western Europe is met by a sharp decline in serfdom, which Domar attributes to overpopulation, a large surplus of labor, and thus a very low land/labor ratio. Additionally, this economic model plays an incredibly important role in the analysis of the causes of slavery in the Colonial American South. Domar states that the American South demonstrated abundant free land and large scale agriculture, but not abundant free labor. In contrast, the American North demonstrated abundant free land and abundant free labor, but not large scale agriculture. The American South during the colonial period was characterized by vast amounts of fertile land that was largely uninhabited previous to colonization, and sparsely populated during colonization. (Domar, 16) Domar attributes the importation of slaves to the American South as an economic need for labor due to such a high land/labor ratio. Domar qualifies the difference in popularity of slavery in the American South relative to the American North to political and social objections, as well as a potential for increased adaptability of slaves to the warmer climate, or the increased productivity that goes along with longer and more fruitful seasons in the south due to the temperature. (Domar, 16)

== Critiques ==
The Domar Serfdom Model has been met with criticism since its publishing in The Journal of Economic History in 1970. In 2009, Professor Jean Jacques Rosa authored a paper titled, “The Causes of Serfdom: A Hypothesis Revisited” in which Rosa argues that serfdom and slavery are mutually exclusive events. Where Domar argues that labor scarcity is a necessary but exogenous political factor needed for serfdom, Rosa challenges his view by showing that “in an agrarian subsistence economy the complementary conditions of serfdom are (a) oligopsony power in labor demand, sustained by (b) an oligopolistic supply of violence by large land owners.” In addition, Professor Erik Green of Lund University argues that Domar's model fails in explaining the origins of slavery in Cape Colony, South Africa, where the consensus is that slavery evolved as an urban phenomenon, which would call into question the land/labor ratio Domar uses to explain the causes of slavery and serfdom. Moreover, Professor Jonathon Cunning of Hunter University authored a paper titled “On the Causes of Slavery or Serfdom and the Roads to Agrarian Capitalism: Domar’s Hypothesis Revisited”. In his paper, Cunning offers a “simple general equilibrium formalization of Domar’s famous hypothesis on the causes of slavery or serfdom that emphasizes the interactions between factor endowments, the nature of the production technologies, and the initial distribution of property rights over land.” Cunning's paper is viewed more so as an expansion upon Domar's model rather than a direct challenge to his hypothesis.
