= Kaldor's growth model =

Nicholas Kaldor in his essay titled A Model of Economic Growth, originally published in Economic Journal in 1957, postulates a growth model, which follows the Harrodian dynamic approach and the Keynesian techniques of analysis. In his growth model, Kaldor attempts “to provide a framework for relating the genesis of technical progress to capital accumulation”, whereas the other neoclassical models treat the causation of technical progress as completely exogenous.

According to Kaldor, “The purpose of a theory of economic growth is to show the nature of non-economic variables which ultimately determine the rate at which the general level of production of the economy is growing, and thereby contribute to an understanding of the question of why some societies grow so much faster than others.”

== Assumptions ==
The basic properties of Kaldor's growth model are as follows:

1. Short period supply of aggregate goods and services in a growing economy is inelastic and not affected by any increase in effective monetary demand. As it is based on the Keynesian assumption of “full employment”.
2. The technical progress depends on the rate of capital accumulation. Kaldor postulates the “technical progress function”, which shows a relationship between the growth of capital and productivity, incorporating the influence of both the factors. Where the capital-output ratio will depend upon the relationship of the growth of capital and the growth of productivity.
3. Wages and profits constitute the income, where wages comprise salaries and earnings of manual labor, and profits comprise incomes of entrepreneurs as well as property owners. And total savings consist of savings out of wages and savings out of profit.
4. General price level is constant.

== See also ==
- Kaldor's facts
- Kaldor's growth laws
- Keynesian economics
- Neoclassical economics

== Additional sources ==
- Tobin, James, (1989) "Growth and Distribution: A Neoclassical Kaldor-Robinson Exercise," Cambridge Journal of Economics, Oxford University Press, vol. 13(1), pages 37-45, March.
