= Home bias puzzle =

The home bias puzzle could refer to two distinct economic phenomena:

- Equity home bias puzzle, the fact that individuals and institutions in most countries hold modest amounts of foreign equity despite the presence of large potential gains from diversification.
- Home bias in trade puzzle, a widely discussed problem in macroeconomics and international finance related to over consumption of domestically produced goods relative to imports.
