= Backward disadvantage =

Concept in economics

- Initiator: Yang Xiaokai
- Introduced: 2002

Backward disadvantage
- Simplified Chinese: 后发劣势
- Traditional Chinese: 後發劣勢
Transcriptions
Standard Mandarin
- Hanyu Pinyin: Hòufā lièshì

The backward disadvantage (simplified Chinese: 后发劣势; traditional Chinese: 後發劣勢), or the disadvantage of backwardness, also known as latecomer's disadvantage, is a viewpoint put forward by Chinese-Australian economist Yang Xiaokai. It is borrowed from the American economist Watson's concept of "curse to the late comer".

Yang pointed out that the "backward disadvantage" refers to the fact that it is easier for late-development countries to imitate technologies, but more difficult to imitate the system, because the reform will offend vested interests, although late developing countries can achieve rapid developments in the short term, but will leave hidden problems for long-term development.

In 2002, in a lecture at the Tianze Economic Research Institute in Beijing, Yang cited Watson's "curse of the late comer" to draw public attention to "backward disadvantages" in China's future social and economic development, which aroused strong reactions in Chinese and foreign academic circles.

== Background ==
After China's reform and opening up achieved remarkable results, Yang calmly put forward the opinion of "backward disadvantage" in response to the rapid growth of China's economy by imitation.

== Solution ==
Yang Xiaokai argues that in order to overcome the "backward disadvantages", the backward countries must first complete the reform of the republican constitutional system, and in order to obtain the "backward advantage" of technological imitation, they must first be good students of the successful system.

== See also ==
- Backward advantage
