= Rate of return pricing =

Rate of return pricing or target-return pricing is a method by which a company will set the price of its product based on their desired returns on said product. The concept of rate return pricing is very similar to return on investment, but in this circumstance the company can manipulate its prices to achieve the desired goal. This method is used primarily by companies that either have a lot of capital or have a monopoly on the market and when an investor requests a specific return on their investment. In a competitive market rate of return pricing can be a poor market strategy as its focus at the final profit margins and does not account for supply and demand factors. If a competitor is able to set a lower price, it could decrease demand for the product resulting in a lower sales then forecasted and failing to reach the desired profit margin.

== Formula ==
The formula is: Target-return pricing = unit cost + [(desired return on investment * invested capital) / expected unit sales]

== Use ==
Rate of return pricing enables firms to better assess the profitability of a product or service. It enables the cost of invested capital to be accounted when the setting price per unit and can be used to forecast the end monetary return of an exercise. It also helps the company in reaching certain profit goals' while maintaining liquidity. Additionally, if market conditions are stable, forecasts for returns will be extremely accurate as a certain target is being used in pricing achievements are solely dependent on sales.
