= Meade Conflict =

Meade Conflict refers to a dilemma where an economy faces conflict between its internal and external balances. The phenomenon was proposed by the British economist and Nobel Prize Laurent James Meade in his influential book The Theory of International Economic Policy – The Balance of Payments (1951). Trevor Swan developed this problem into Swan diagram, which became more influential in the economic theory. The discovery has also led to other models such as Tinbergen's Rule.

== Analysis ==
According to Meade's analysis, a country can find itself in the following four circumstances:

1. Balance-of-payments surplus and a domestic recession.
2. Balance-of-payments deficit and a domestic inflation.
3. Balance-of-payments surplus and a domestic inflation.
4. Balance-of-payments deficit and a domestic recession.

The problems in cases (a) and (b) can be solved using economic policies. Case (a) requires expansionary fiscal and monetary policies that will reduce the surplus and spur recovery from the recession, while case (b) is the circumstance vice versa.

However, in case (c), if the government and central bank of the country tries to restore payment equilibrium by expansionary policies, these measures will worsen inflation. The other alternative of tight fiscal and monetary policies means reduced inflation, but also worsen the surplus in payments. In the similar dilemma of case (d), the deficit implies that tight monetary and fiscal policies should be used, which worsens the country's recession, while the expansionary policies that will end the recession would worsen the payments deficit. Cases (c) and (d) are known as the Meade Conflict.

== Influences ==
The phenomenon draws wide attention in China as the country was going through such circumstances in 2007 and 2018. The term has become more popular in Chinese news and literature than in some English-speaking countries.
