= LoopCo =

LoopCo is an economic model created in the mid-1990s as a proposal to the Federal Communications Commission and the U.S. Congress for the healthy development of competition in the local and long distance telephone industries in the United States.

While there was widespread support among competitors in the industry, the concept was not implemented. Instead, the Telecom Act of 1996 was implemented in a form that resulted in the reduction of telecommunications competition in the local loop. The original proposal was designed and named by Roy Morris, an adjunct professor at Capitol College, and with US ONE Communications, one of the early entrants in the local telephone business (and, incidentally, one of the first to exit that business). The fundamental economic principles were developed based on earlier research and publications of Jerry Duvall, a prominent economist at the Federal Communications Commission.
