= Inventory bounce =

Inventory bounce is a term used in economics to describe an economy's bounce back to normal GDP levels after a recession. It is also sometimes called inventory bounce-back.

Firms usually keep a certain amount of inventory. When an economy faces a recession, sales might be unexpectedly low, which results in unexpectedly high inventory. In the next period, firms cut production so that inventory will drop to their desired levels, which results in even lower GDP. Subsequently, firms might increase the production back up to maintain the usual level of inventory, which causes the GDP to bounce back. This bounce back is called an inventory bounce. We care about it because if GDP recovers is only an inventory bounce, the recovery of GDP might not be sustained, which means that economy might not have truly recovered from the recession.
