= Deflator =

Value in statistics

In statistics, a deflator is a value that allows data to be measured over time in terms of some base period, usually through a price index, in order to distinguish between changes in the money value of a gross national product (GNP) that come from a change in prices, and changes from a change in physical output. It is the measure of the price level for some quantity. A deflator serves as a price index in which the effects of inflation are nulled. It is the difference between real and nominal GDP.

In the United States, the import and export price indexes produced by the International Price Program are used as deflators in national accounts. For example, the gross domestic product (GDP) equals consumption expenditures plus net investment plus government expenditures plus exports minus imports. Various price indexes are used to "deflate" each component of the GDP to make the GDP figures comparable over time. Import price indexes are used to deflate the import component (i.e., import volume is divided by the Import Price index) and the export price indexes are used to deflate the export component (i.e., export volume is divided by the Export Price index).

It is generally used as a statistical tool to convert dollars purchasing power into "inflation-adjusted" purchasing power, thus enabling the comparison of prices while accounting for inflation in various time periods.

== See also ==
- Bureau of Labor Statistics
- GDP Deflator
- Gross domestic product
- Deflation
- Inflation
- Economic indicators
- Producer price index (PPI)
- Consumer price index (CPI)
