= Turnpike model of money =

The turnpike model of money explains valued money as a way to facilitate trade between agents who meet as strangers in spatially separated isolated markets with no communication or transactions between the markets at any time.

In the standard frictionless Arrow–Debreu model, since the nonmonetary competitive equilibria are already Pareto optimal, money can't facilitate exchange or is at best useless. A common approach in monetary economics is to either require that agents hold money for institutional reasons (for example, to pay taxes, or because the government forces individuals to accept it), to enter money holdings directly into individual's utility functions (the so-called "money in utility" or Sidrauski model), or to impose an arbitrary cash-in-advance constraint (the so-called Clower constraint). However all of these approaches are somewhat ad hoc and do not explain why intrinsically worthless money can have value as medium of exchange. The turnpike model of money is one of the possible resolutions of this theoretical problem.
