= Growth recession =

Period of slowed economic growth

Growth Recession is a term in economics that refers to a situation where economic growth is slow, but not low enough to be a technical recession, yet unemployment still increases.

== Background ==
The term was created in 1972 by Dr. Solomon Fabricant (New York University, National Bureau of Economic Research) and is recognized and cited more recently by business economists. Note that the term also has slightly different secondary meanings including a more general one that growth is below potential. However, the more specific meaning indicates the growth is weak and insufficient to provide jobs for those entering the labor market (see the Hoisington and Hunt reference). There may also be a third meaning referring to growth in which more jobs are actually being destroyed than created. In all cases, the term indicates, Real GDP is expanding (slowly) but with job contraction, so the economy behaves or feels in many ways like a recession.

A Soft Landing tends to also be a Growth Recession, but this is not always the case. If economic growth in the economy is slowing to such a point that establishment payroll growth contracts, then the soft landing is so soft it has crossed over into a growth recession. The soft landings in the mid-1980s and the mid-1990s are examples.

Jobless Recovery, is a related term. All jobless recoveries are by definition also growth recessions, however not all growth recessions are jobless recoveries because a growth recession can occur at any point in an economic cycle, and a jobless recovery only refers to the period immediately after a recession ends.

Stagflation is not to be confused with a growth recession, despite featuring similar qualities. High inflation rates accompany high unemployment levels and a prolonged period of economic growth, otherwise known as stagnation. A growth recession will last for more than a quarter of the year, while stagflation can last for years as seen during the 1970s Energy Crisis when the term was coined.

=== Growth Recession vs. Recession ===
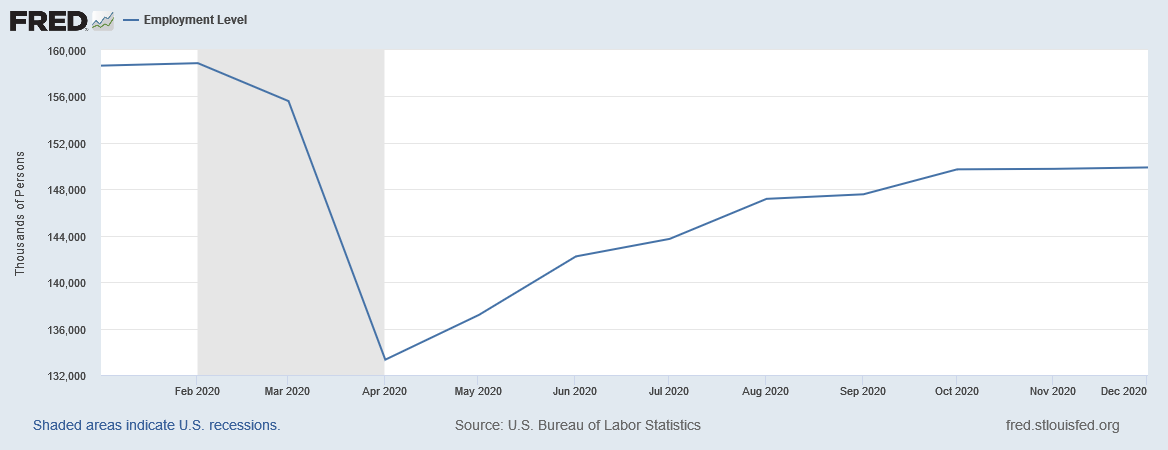
US employment level in 2020

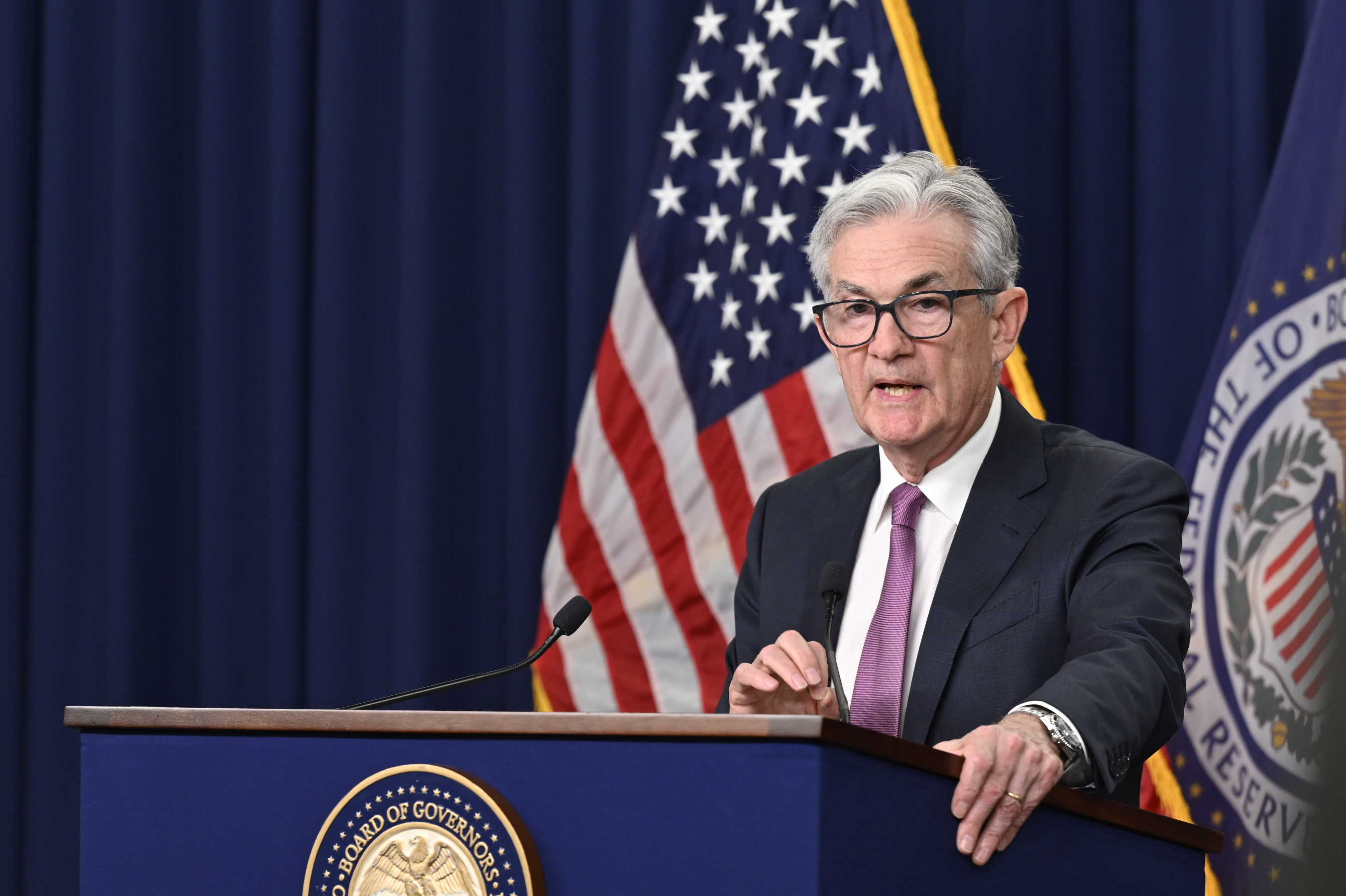
Chairman Jerome Powell at a press conference in July 2022

The NASDAQ (National Association of Securities Dealers Automated Quotations) considers negative GDP (Gross Domestic Product) growth lasting six months or more to be a recession. A growth recession will last for more than a quarter of the year, and despite the negative GDP growth and high unemployment levels, it does not last as long as an official recession and there is still economic growth. An example of this occurred between February 2020 and April 2020, when employment levels dropped to a record high unemployment rate of 14.7 percent. According to the U.S. Bureau of Labor Statistics, this is the highest unemployment rate on record since January 1948. However, despite GDP growth and employment levels dropping for only two months, this short period of time is referred to as the COVID-19 Recession.

In comparison to a longer running recession, a growth recession is the next best option as suggested by Federal Reserve Chair, Jerome Powell, at a Jackson Hole Conference on August 26, 2022, in Jackson Hole, Wyoming. After the Federal Reserve was unable to maneuver the economy towards a soft landing, Chairman Powell gave a speech at the economic policy symposium to present the Fed's reassessment of the economy and their aggressive policy to tackle inflation. According to economists, the soft landing would have allowed the economy to avoid a recession and rein inflation back down to 2 percent without exacerbating unemployment levels, but the rapid rise in price growth has left the Federal Reserve with no other option. The aggressive measure is needed to ensure price stability in the economy as the United States continues to recover from the two-month-long recession brought on by the 2019 Pandemic. According to Chairman Powell, uncontrolled high inflation will cause greater damage to the economy versus the “unfortunate costs” faced by businesses and most consumers, who face job loses and higher costs of affordability for basic goods. However, hiking interest rates to cool market demand is one of the driving factors behind the Federal Open Market Committee's (FOMC) mission to reduce inflation and regain price stability in the market. A slow growing economy within a growth recession may prevent far worse economic conditions such as stagflation, where it is more difficult to recover the economy and employment levels.

The pain caused by higher interest rates on companies and consumers is even more challenging as the labor market is struggling to recover from its pandemic levels despite a slow growing economy. This was another concern address by Chairman Powell, who noted the discrepancy between jobs added and the available workforce in August. Businesses have attempted to raise wages to attract employees, but Chairman Powell fears this may exacerbate price instability if the disparity between jobs and workers continues.
