= Dorfman–Steiner theorem =

The Dorfman–Steiner theorem (or Dorfman–Steiner condition) is a neoclassical economics theorem which looks for the optimal level of advertising that a firm should undertake. The theorem is named after Robert Dorfman and Peter O. Steiner who developed the approach in their widely cited 1954 article in the American Economic Review. Firms can increase their sales by either decreasing the price of the good, or persuading consumers to buy more by increasing advertising expenditure. The optimal level of advertising for a firm is found where the ratio of advertising to sales equals the price-cost margin times the advertising elasticity of demand. The obvious result is that the greater the degree of sensitivity of quantity demanded to advertising and the greater the margin on the extra output then the higher the level of advertising.

A simple textbook presentation of the mathematical statement of the approach is as follows:

$$\frac{p_A A}{p.q}=\frac{p-c}{p}.e_A$$

Where

$\ p_A$ is the price per unit of advertising
$\ A$ is the amount of advertising
$\ p$ is the price of the good
$\ q$ is the output of the good
$\ c$ is the average or marginal, depending on the assumptions, cost of production
$\ e_A$ is the advertising elasticity of demand.
