= Crowding-in effect =

Economic phenomenon

Crowding-in occurs when an increase in government spending leads to more private investment. It occurs because public investment makes the private sector more productive, as well as because government spending may have a stimulative effect on the economy. It is contrasted with crowding out, which occurs when government spending leads to less private investment.

== History ==
While both crowding in and crowding out are observed empirically, there are long-standing debates over which effect tends to prevail, and under what circumstances. The theories of classical economists such as Adam Smith, J. B. Say, and Karl Marx are generally interpreted as being more consistent with crowding out. The crowding-in effect is generally associated with the economic theories of John Maynard Keynes and post-Keynesian economics. Presently, the crowding-out effect is generally associated with Neoclassical and New Keynesian economics. The crowding-in theory has gained popularity in the aftermath of the Great Recession of 2007–2009, when public spending in the United States occurred simultaneously to a drop in interest rates.

== Mechanisms of the crowding-in effect ==
The most well-known mechanisms for the crowding-in effect are based on public investment. The construction or improvement of physical infrastructure increases the productivity of the private sector. Examples of physical infrastructure investment that exhibit this property include transportation infrastructure such as roads and ports, health and sanitation infrastructure such as sewage systems, and communications infrastructure such as broadband networks. The predominance of this effect is found robustly across developed and developing countries.

Nevertheless, there are also mechanisms by which even non-investment government spending can elicit the crowding-in effect. One proposed mechanism is via increased aggregate demand. Government spending or tax cuts can be used to increase aggregate demand. This rise in demand leads to more employment opportunities as businesses "crowd in" to take advantage of the opportunity. Another is based on the ability of the government to resolve deflation. In a situation of deflation, real interest rates may be high, inhibiting investment. Using targeted public spending to create inflationary pressure, real interest rates may be reduced, stimulating private sector investment. Government spending may also induce private sector investment via the multiplier effect. This is the ratio of change in national income arising from a change in government spending. As the government spends, the national income rises by more than what is spent, inducing more spending by the private sector. This additional demand stimulates investment.

== Models of the Crowding-in effect ==
Aschauer (1989) presents a neoclassical study of increases in the productivity of private capital resulting from the accumulation of public capital through public investment in the US. They find that nonmilitary spending, especially on core infrastructure, has a significant and positive relationship with private sector productivity. They propose that the slowdown in government spending in the early 1970s may have been an important factor in the private sector productivity decline that took place at that time.

Toshiya Hatano (2010) presents a model which demonstrates the importance of considering the long-run stock of fixed capital (rather than just investment flows) in evaluating the presence of the crowding-in effect.

== Determinants of government expenditure effects ==
Whether government spending causes crowding in or crowding out is generally considered to hinge on three main factors:

1. Whether the spending is for government investment or consumption. Public investment is considered much more likely to lead to crowding in.
2. Whether public investment substitutes or complements private investment. If public investment substitutes for private investment, it reduces the amount of investment that the private sector is incentivized to undertake.
3. Whether government spending is financed through taxation or debt creation. Government spending financed through taxation reduces the disposable income of the private sector, which has a negative impact on aggregate demand. This attenuates private sector investment independently of the effect of the government spending, which may itself be positive.

According to New Keynesian economics, the crowding-in effect via government spending is more likely to occur in transitional or developing countries. This is because New Keynesian theory, like neoclassical theory, considers developed economies to generally operate near full employment. In case of recession, there is unused private sector savings and production capacity (unemployed labor force, unused capital infrastructure, etc.). An increment in government expenditure significantly increases national income in developing countries due to the presence of relatively higher levels of unemployment factors of production. This increase in national income further increases the purchasing capacity and encourages the growth of private investment. At the same time, an increase in the budget deficit will have a very small influence on interest rate growth because of the high elasticity of speculative demand for money (horizontal LM curve). In transitional countries, national income is the most important factor influencing private influencing the private investment. The impact of the interest rate is much smaller.

The crowding-out effect may appear either directly or indirectly. Direct crowding-out occurs with the reduction of the physical resources available to the private sector. Indirect crowding-out takes place through an increase in interest rates and prices.

Inflation may also limit the crowding-in effect. Inflation induces banks to increase interest rates. As interest rates increase, private investment tends to decline.
