= Hourglass economy =

An hourglass economy is an economy that produces more upper and lower classes, causing a decline in the middle class. An example would be during the Industrial Revolution when the introduction of efficient machinery created stratification of the classes with more lower paying unskilled jobs. This can be seen when the peak of a particular business model is growing and the antapex is growing drawing the middle in tighter and tighter.

== In the United States ==
In the United States of America, the American middle class must pursue higher income or face stagnation due to policy passed by government. Less borrowing to relatively risky businesses, less availability of making large capital gains as well as rising inflation. Commodities are at record levels, keeping the large companies maintaining record profits, while the middle class are paying more for all this, as the primary consumers of goods, and falling into the bottom of the hourglass.

Citigroup's analysts have labeled the American economy a “consumer hourglass economy.” The wealthy are doing fine, while the number of those living in poverty grows, and the middle is disappearing. New poverty figures show a big jump in the number of poorest Americans. Meanwhile, the middle class is disappearing.

== In Canada ==
Professor Thomas J. Courchene of Queen's University proposes that federal cutbacks of provincial transfers to social services since 1995 has caused significant fiscal imbalances. These funding cuts forced the provinces to make cutbacks in nearly every provincial jurisdiction, except healthcare because cutting healthcare funding would be political suicide, but this left almost every other provincial jurisdiction, including cities which are creations of the provinces, with reduced and often insufficient funding. However, in the meantime, the federal government has been providing greater funds to social programs but they have been bypassing the provinces and giving the money directly to cities or citizens. This allows the federal government to fund provincial jurisdictions directly causing the provinces to become “the squeezed middle of the division-of-powers hourglass”.

Courchene defines Hourglass Federalism as “Ottawa’s use of the spending power and other instruments to fiscally starve the provinces and then to make an end run around them to deal directly with cities and citizens alike, leaving the provinces of the squeezed middle of the division-of-powers hourglass”.
