= Cournot =

Cournot may refer to:

- Cournot competition, an economic model of duopoly

Surname

- Antoine Augustin Cournot (1801–1877), French philosopher, mathematician and economist
- Michel Cournot (1922–2007), French journalist, screenwriter and film director
