= Conjectural variation =

In oligopoly theory, conjectural variation is the belief that one firm has an idea about the way its competitors may react if it varies its output or price. The firm forms a conjecture about the variation in the other firm's output that will accompany any change in its own output.

For example, in the classic Cournot model of oligopoly, it is assumed that each firm treats the output of the other firms as given when it chooses its output. This is sometimes called the "Nash conjecture," as it underlies the standard Nash equilibrium concept. However, alternative assumptions can be made. Suppose you have two firms producing the same good, so that the industry price is determined by the combined output of the two firms (think of the water duopoly in Cournot's original 1838 account). Now suppose that each firm has what is called the "Bertrand Conjecture" of −1. This means that if firm A increases its output, it conjectures that firm B will reduce its output to exactly offset firm A's increase, so that total output and hence price remains unchanged. With the Bertrand Conjecture, the firms act as if they believe that the market price is unaffected by their own output, because each firm believes that the other firm will adjust its output so that total output will be constant. At the other extreme is the Joint-Profit maximizing conjecture of +1. In this case, each firm believes that the other will imitate exactly any change in output it makes, which leads (with constant marginal cost) to the firms behaving like a single monopoly supplier.

== History ==
The notion of conjectures has maintained a long history in the Industrial Organization theory ever since the introduction of Conjectural Variations Equilibria by Arthur Bowley in 1924 and Ragnar Frisch (1933) (a useful summary of the history is provided by Giocoli). Not only are conjectural variations (henceforth CV) models able to capture a range of behavioral outcomes – from competitive to cooperative, but also they have one parameter which has a simple economic interpretation. CV models have also been found quite useful in the empirical analysis of firm behavior in the sense that they provide a more general description of firms behavior than the standard Nash equilibrium.

As Stephen Martin has argued:

There is every reason to believe that oligopolists in different markets interact in different ways, and it is useful to have models that can capture a wide range of such interactions. Conjectural oligopoly models, in any event, have been more useful than game-theoretic oligopoly models in guiding the specification of empirical research in industrial economics.

== Consistent conjectures ==
The CVs of firms determine the slopes of their reaction functions. For example, in the standard Cournot model, the conjecture is of a zero reaction, yet the actual slope of the Cournot reaction function is negative. What happens if we require the actual slope of the reaction function to be equal to the conjecture? Some economists argued that we could pin down the conjectures by a consistency condition, most notably Timothy Bresnahan in 1981. Bresnahan's consistency was a local condition that required the actual slope of the reaction function to be equal to the conjecture at the equilibrium outputs. With linear industry demand and quadratic costs, this gave rise to the result that the consistent conjecture depended on the slope of the marginal cost function: for example, with quadratic costs of the form (see below) cost = a.x^{2}, the consistent conjecture is unique and determined by a. If a=0 then the unique consistent conjecture is the Bertrand conjecture $\phi^*=-1$, and as a get bigger, the consistent conjecture increases (becomes less negative) but is always less than zero for finite a.

The concept of consistent conjectures was criticized by several leading economists. Essentially, the concept of consistent conjectures was seen as not compatible with the standard models of rationality employed in Game theory.

However, in the 1990s Evolutionary game theory became fashionable in economics. It was realized that this approach could provide a foundation for the evolution of consistent conjectures. Huw Dixon and Ernesto Somma showed that we could treat the conjecture of a firm as a meme (the cultural equivalent of a gene). They showed that in the standard Cournot model, the consistent conjecture was the Evolutionarily stable strategy or ESS. As the authors argued, "Beliefs determine Behavior. Behavior determines payoff. From an evolutionary perspective, those types of behavior that lead to higher payoffs become more common." In the long run, firms with consistent conjectures would tend to earn bigger profits and come to predominate.

== Mathematical example 1: Cournot model with CVs ==
Let there be two firms, X and Y, with outputs x and y. The market price P is given by the linear demand curve

$P = 1 - x - y$

so that the total revenue of firm X is then

$xP = x(1 - x - y) = x - x^2 - xy$

For simplicity, let us follow Cournot's 1838 model and assume that there are no production costs, so that profits equal revenue $\Pi = x - x^2 - xy$.

With conjectural variations, the first order condition for the firm becomes:

$\frac{d \Pi}{dx}=(1-2x-y)-x\frac{dy}{dx} =0$

where $\frac{dy}{dx} = \phi$ is the firms conjecture about how the other firm will respond, the conjectural variation or CV term. This first order optimization condition defines the reaction function for the firm, which states, for a given CV, the optimal choice of output given the other firm's output.

$x=R(y,\phi)=\frac{1-y}{2+\phi}$

Note that the Cournot-Nash Conjecture is $\phi=0$, in which case we have the standard Cournot Reaction function. The CV term serves to shift the reaction function and most importantly later its slope. To solve for a symmetric equilibrium, where both firms have the same CV, we simply note that the reaction function will pass through the x=y line so that:

$y=\frac{1-x}{2+\phi}$ so that in symmetric equilibrium $x^*=y^*=\frac{1}{3+\phi}$ and the equilibrium price is $P^*=\frac{1+\phi}{3+\phi}$.

If we have the Cournot-Nash conjecture, $\phi=0$, then we have the standard Cournot equilibrium with $P^*=\frac{1}{3}$. However, if we have the Bertrand conjecture $\phi=-1$, then we obtain the perfectly competitive outcome with price equal to marginal cost (which is zero here). If we assume the joint-profit maximizing conjecture $\phi=+1$ then both firms produce half of the monopoly output and the price is the monopoly price $P^*=\frac{1}{2}$.

Hence the CV term $\phi$ is a simple behavioral parameter which enables us to represent a whole range of possible market outcomes from the competitive to the monopoly outcome, including the standard Cournot model.

== Mathematical example 2: Consistency ==
Take the previous example. Now let the cost of production take the form: cost = a.x^{2}. In this case, the profit function (revenue minus cost) becomes (for firm X and analogously for firm Y):

$\Pi = (x - x^2 - xy)- \frac{a.x^2}{2}$

The first-order condition then becomes:

$\frac{d \Pi}{dx}=(1-2x-y)-x\frac{dy}{dx}-ax = 0$

which defines the reaction function for firm X as:

$x=R(y,\phi)=\frac{1-y}{2+a+\phi}$

This has slope (in output space)

$R_y= -\frac{1}{2+a+\phi}$

and analogously for firm Y which (we assume) has the same conjecture. To see what consistency means, consider the simple Cournot conjecture $\phi=0$ with constant marginal cost a=0. In this case the slope of the reaction functions is −1/2 which is "inconsistent" with the conjecture. The Bresnehan consistency condition is that the conjectured slope $\phi$ equals the actual slope $R_y$ which means that

$\phi= -\frac{1}{2+a+\phi}$

This is a quadratic equation which gives us the unique consistent conjecture

$\phi^*= -(1+\frac{a}{2})+\sqrt{\frac{4a+a^2}{4}}$

This is the positive root of the quadratic: the negative solution would be a conjecture more negative than −1 which would violate the second order conditions. As we can see from this example, when a=0 (marginal cost is horizontal), the Bertrand conjecture is consistent $\phi^*= -1$. As the steepness of marginal cost increases (a goes up), the consistent conjecture increases. Note that the consistent conjecture will always be less than 0 for any finite a.
