= Bertrand paradox (economics) =

Paradox in economics

In economics and commerce, the Bertrand paradox — named after its creator, Joseph Bertrand — describes a situation in which two players (firms) reach a state of Nash equilibrium where both firms charge a price equal to marginal cost ("MC"). The paradox is that in models such as Cournot competition, an increase in the number of firms is associated with a convergence of prices to marginal costs. In these alternative models of oligopoly, a small number of firms earn positive profits by charging prices above cost.

Suppose two firms, A and B, sell a homogeneous commodity, each with the same cost of production and distribution, so that customers choose the product solely on the basis of price. It follows that demand is infinitely price-elastic. Neither A nor B will set a higher price than the other because doing so would yield the entire market to their rival. If they set the same price, the companies will share both the market and profits.

On the other hand, if either firm were to lower its price, even a little, it would gain the whole market and substantially larger profits. Since both A and B know this, they will each try to undercut their competitor until the product is selling at zero economic profit. This is the pure-strategy Nash equilibrium. Recent work has shown that there may be an additional mixed-strategy Nash equilibrium with positive economic profits under the assumption that monopoly profits are infinite. For the case of finite monopoly profits, it has been shown that positive profits under price competition are impossible in mixed equilibria and even in the more general case of correlated equilibria.

The Bertrand paradox rarely appears in practice because real products are almost always differentiated in some way other than price (brand name, if nothing else); firms have limitations on their capacity to manufacture and distribute, and two firms rarely have identical costs.

Bertrand's result is paradoxical because if the number of firms goes from one to two, the price decreases from the monopoly price to the competitive price and stays at the same level as the number of firms increases further. This is not very realistic, as in reality, markets featuring a small number of firms with market power typically charge a price in excess of marginal cost. The empirical analysis shows that in most industries with two competitors, positive profits are made. Solutions to the Paradox attempt to derive solutions that are more in line with solutions from the Cournot model of competition, where two firms in a market earn positive profits that lie somewhere between the perfectly competitive and monopoly levels.

== Why the paradox doesn't happen in practice ==
Some reasons the Bertrand paradox do not strictly apply:

- Capacity constraints. Sometimes firms do not have enough capacity to satisfy all demand. This was a point first raised by Francis Edgeworth and gave rise to the Bertrand–Edgeworth model.
- Integer pricing. Prices higher than MC are ruled out because one firm can undercut another by an arbitrarily small amount. If prices are discrete (for example have to take integer values) then one firm has to undercut the other by at least one cent. This implies that the price one cent above MC is now an equilibrium: if the other firm sets the price one cent above MC, the other firm can undercut it and capture the whole market, but this will earn it no profit. It will prefer to share the market 50/50 with the other firm and earn strictly positive profits.
- Product differentiation. If products of different firms are differentiated, then consumers may not switch completely to the product with lower price.
- Dynamic competition. Repeated interaction or repeated price competition can lead to the price above MC in equilibrium.
- More money for higher price. It follows from repeated interaction: If one company sets their price slightly higher, then they will still get about the same amount of buys but more profit for each buy, so the other company will raise their price, and so on (only in repeated games, otherwise the price dynamics are in the other direction).
- Oligopoly. If the two companies can agree on a price, it is in their long-term interest to keep the agreement: the revenue from cutting prices is less than twice the revenue from keeping the agreement and lasts only until the other firm cuts its own prices.
- Effort to Purchase. If there is a difference in the effort it takes for a consumer to purchase one over the other based on the consumer's circumstances (such as a difference in travel time to stores that stock the products), this can cause consumers to prefer one product over the other even if the product itself is exactly the same.
- Social Interdependence. If indifferent consumers are treated as having a strategic choice between products based on loyalty and the choices of others the firms can achieve a price equilibrium with positive profits without directly violating Bertrand's assumptions.
- Goodwill. Even when confronted with otherwise identical products in a market of price competition the two companies are themselves inherently different entities which may influence a consumer's choice of product via brand goodwill.
- Status Quo. Consumers have an observed bias for retaining status quo so even when a new firm with identical product enters a market, consumers are biased to continue to purchase from the original firm.
- Customer Heterogeneity. While products may be homogenous, heterogenous consumers can still create a market in which two price competing firms achieve price equilibrium with positive profits.

== See also ==
- Bertrand–Edgeworth model
- Bertrand model
- Differentiated Bertrand competition
- Edgeworth paradox
- Joseph Bertrand
- Prisoner's dilemma
- Hotelling's law
