= Duopoly =

Type of oligopoly

A duopoly (from Greek δύο, duo 'two'; and πωλεῖν, polein 'to sell') is a type of oligopoly where two firms have dominant or exclusive control over a market, and most (if not all) of the competition within that market occurs directly between them.

Duopoly is the most commonly studied form of oligopoly due to its simplicity. Duopolies sell to consumers in a competitive market where the choice of an individual consumer choice cannot affect the firm in a duopoly market, as the defining characteristic of duopolies is that decisions made by each seller are dependent on what the other competitor does. Duopolies can exist in various forms, such as Cournot, Bertrand, or Stackelberg competition. These models demonstrate how firms in a duopoly can compete on output or price, depending on the assumptions made about firm behavior and market conditions.

Similar features are discernible in national political systems of party duopoly.

== Duopoly models in economics and game theory ==
=== Cournot duopoly ===
==== Cournot model in game theory ====
In 1838, Antoine Augustin Cournot published a book titled "Researches Into the Mathematical Principles of the Theory of Wealth" in which he introduced and developed this model for the first time. This imperfect competition model, in which two firms with identical cost functions compete with homogenous products in a static context, is also known as Cournot competition. The Cournot model shows that two firms assume each other's output and treat this as a fixed amount, and produce in their own firm according to this. The Cournot duopoly model relies on the following assumptions:

- Each firm chooses a quantity to produce independently
- All firms make this choice simultaneously
- The cost structures of the firms are public information

In this model, two companies, each of which chooses its own quantity of output, compete against each other while facing constant marginal and average costs. The market price is determined by the sum of the output of two companies. $P(Q)=a-bQ$ is the equation for the market demand function.

- Market with two firms i = 1, 2 with constant marginal cost c_{i}
- Inverse market demand for a homogeneous good: P(Q) = a − bQ
- Where Q is the sum of both firms' production levels: Q = q_{1} + q_{2}
- Firms choose their quantity simultaneously (static game)
- Firms maximize their profit:

$$\begin{aligned}
\Pi_1(q_1,q_2) &= \left(P(q_1 + q_2) - c_1\right)*q_1\,, \\
\Pi_2(q_1,q_2) &= \left(P(q_1 + q_2) - c_2\right)*q_2
\end{aligned}$$

The general process for obtaining a Nash equilibrium of a game using the best response functions is followed in order to discover a Nash equilibrium of Cournot's model for a specific cost function and demand function. A Nash Equilibrium of the Cournot model is a ($q_1^*, q_2^*$) such that

For a given $q_1^*$, $q_2^*$ solves:

$$\begin{aligned}
\operatorname{MAX}_{q1} \Pi_1(q_1, q_2^*) &= (P(q_1 + q_2^*) - c_1)q_1\,, \\
\operatorname{MAX}_{q2} \Pi_2(q_1^*, q_2) &= (P(q_1^* + q_2) - c_1)q_2
\end{aligned}$$

Given the other firm's optimal quantity, each firm maximizes its profit over the residual inverse demand. In equilibrium, no firm can increase profits by changing its output level. The two first order conditions equal to zero are the best response.

Cournot's duopoly marked the beginning of the study of oligopolies, and specifically duopolies, as well as the expansion of the research of market structures, which had previously focussed on the extremes of perfect competition and monopoly. In the Cournot duopoly model, firms choose the quantity of output they produce simultaneously, taking into consideration the quantity produced by their competitor. Each firm's profit depends on the total output produced by both firms, and the market price is determined by the sum of their outputs. The goal of each firm is to maximize its profit given the output produced by the other firm. This process continues until both firms reach a Nash equilibrium, where neither firm has an incentive to change its output level given the output of the other firm.

=== Bertrand duopoly ===
==== Bertrand model in game theory ====
The Bertrand competition was developed by a French mathematician called Joseph Louis François Bertrand after investigating the claims of the Cournot model in "Researches into the mathematical principles of the theory of wealth, 1838". According to the Cournot model, firms in a duopoly would be able to keep prices above marginal cost and hence be extremely profitable. Bertrand took issue with this. In this market structure, each firm could only choose whole amounts and each firm receives zero payoffs when the aggregate demand exceeds the size of the amount that they share with each other. The market demand function is $Q(P)=a-bP$. The Bertrand model has similar assumptions to the Cournot model:

- Two firms
- Homogeneous products
- Both firms know the market demand curve
- However, unlike the Cournot model, it assumes that firms have the same marginal cost (MC). It also assumes that the MC is constant.

The Bertrand model, in which, in a game of two firms, competes in price instead of output. Each one of them will assume that the other will not change prices in response to its price cuts. When both firms use this logic, they will reach a Nash equilibrium.

- Consider price competition among two firms (i = 1, 2) selling homogeneous good
- Downward sloping market demand D(p), with D′(p) < 0
- Constant, symmetric marginal cost c_{1} = c_{2} = c
- Static game: firms set prices simultaneously
- Rationing rule of demand:
1. lowest priced firm wins all demand at its price
2. if prices are tied, each firm gets half of market demand at this price
- Firm i's profits: $\Pi_i = (p_i-c)D_i(p_i, p_j)$

Let p^{m} be the monopoly price, $p^m = \operatorname{argmax}_p(p-c)D(p)$

- Firm i's best response R_{i}(p_{j}) is:

$$R_i(p_j) = \begin{cases}
p^m, & \text{if } p_j > p^m \\
p_j - c, & \text{if } c < p_j \le p^m \\
c, & \text{if } p_j \le c
\end{cases}$$

For rival prices above cost, each firm has incentive to undercut rival to get the whole demand. If rival prices below cost, firms make losses when it attracts demand; firm better off charging at cost level. Nash equilibrium is p_{1} = p_{2} = c.

==== Bertrand paradox ====
Under static price competition with homogenous products and constant, symmetric marginal cost, firms price at the level of marginal cost and make no economic profits. In contrast to the Cournot model, the Bertrand duopoly model assumes that firms compete on price rather than quantity. Each firm sets its price simultaneously, anticipating that the other firm will not change its price in response. When both firms use this logic, they will reach a Nash equilibrium, where neither firm has an incentive to change its price given the price set by the other firm. In this model, firms tend to price their products at the level of their marginal cost, resulting in zero economic profits, a phenomenon known as the Bertrand paradox.

== Characteristics of duopoly ==
1. Existence of only two sellers.
2. Interdependence: the action of each firm influences the demand faced by their rival.
3. Product differentiation can give firms market power, allowing them to charge prices above marginal cost.
4. It is the most basic form of oligopoly.
5. Barriers to entry: high entry barriers are often present in duopolies, making it difficult for new firms to enter the market.

== Quality standards ==
In a duopoly, quality standards can play a significant role in the competitive dynamics between the two firms. A low-quality manufacturer may benefit from a slightly stringent quality standard in the absence of sunk costs, whereas a high-quality producer may suffer from it. Consumer welfare improves if the firm generating the higher quality does not considerably enhance its quality in response to its competitor's increase in quality. Exit from the industry is triggered by a sufficiently strict requirement. The high-quality producer exits first when there are no sunk costs. In some cases, firms may engage in a quality competition, attempting to outdo one another by improving their products or services to attract more customers.

== Politics ==
Like a market, a political system can be dominated by two groups, which exclude other parties or ideologies from participation. This is known as a two-party system. In such a system, one party or the other tends to dominate government at any given time (the Majority party), while the other has only limited power (the Minority party). According to Duverger's law, this tends to be caused by a simple winner-take-all voting system without runoffs or ranked choices. The United States and many Latin American countries, such as Costa Rica, Guyana, and the Dominican Republic have two-party government systems.

=== Duopoly in Danish court politics ===
The prime minister-finance minister duopoly is an unusual form of court politics. There have been few other countries where the prime minister and the Treasury have had such a tumultuous relationship as Australia and the United Kingdom. There have been some confrontations in the past when the Finance ministry did not have the full support of the prime minister, leading to internal ministerial battles over economic strategy. A permanent civil service is a basic requirement for the duopoly system to function properly. The permanent civil service in general, and the Socialist Party in particular, are critical to the duopoly's effective operation. The conventional inter-governmental duopoly is carried by civil servants. The duopoly is confronted with some quandaries, such as tensions between different groups in the office over their relative positions. Departmental budget cuts are being made across the board. The prime ministerial-finance-ministry duopoly requires more credibility. Trust is a rare commodity among Australians and Britons. Denmark has a lot to offer. The Danish duopoly works together. Australia and the United Kingdom have competitive duopolies, and competitive duopolies are unstable.

== Types of duopoly ==
=== Cournot duopoly ===
A Cournot duopoly is a model of strategic interaction between two firms where they simultaneously choose their output levels, assuming the rival's output level is fixed. The firms compete on quantity, and each firm attempts to maximize its profit given the other firm's output level. This leads to a Nash equilibrium where neither firm has an incentive to change its output, given the other firm's output.

=== Bertrand duopoly ===
In a Bertrand duopoly, two firms compete on price instead of quantity. Each firm assumes that its rival's price is fixed and chooses its own price to maximize profit. With homogeneous products, identical constant marginal costs and no capacity constraints, the model predicts prices equal to marginal cost, matching the competitive price.

=== Stackelberg duopoly ===
A Stackelberg duopoly is a model where one firm (the leader) chooses its output level first, followed by the other firm (the follower). The follower observes the leader's output decision and adjusts its own output to maximize profit. With homogeneous products, linear demand and identical constant marginal costs, the Stackelberg model yields higher total output and a lower market price than the Cournot model.

== Examples in business ==
A commonly cited example of a duopoly is that involving Visa and Mastercard, who between them control a large proportion of the electronic payment processing market. In 2000 they were the defendants in a United States Department of Justice antitrust lawsuit. An appeal was upheld in 2004.

Other current and historical examples include:

- Airbus and Boeing in the market for large passenger aircraft.
- Nvidia and AMD in the discrete graphics card market before the launch of Intel Arc in 2022.
- Intel and AMD in the personal computer CPU market during 1993–2004.
- Google's Android and Apple's iOS make up over 99% of the mobile operating system market
- Coca-Cola and Pepsi in the carbonated soft drink market.
- DC and Marvel in the American comic book market
- Woolworths and Foodstuffs in the New Zealand supermarket market.
- Woolworths and Coles, which had established a duopoly in the Australian supermarket market by 2000.
- Myer and David Jones in the Australian traditional department store market.
- Ford Australia and Holden, historically in the Australian large-car market.
- World Wrestling Federation and World Championship Wrestling in the United States professional wrestling industry during the 1990s.
- Windows and macOS in the personal computer operating system (OS) market.
- Kesko and S Group together hold a 85% market share of grocery stores in Finland.
- Christie's and Sotheby's sell more than 80% of works priced over $1m at auction.
- Qantas Group (including Jetstar) and Virgin Australia in the Australian domestic airline market, which the Australian Competition and Consumer Commission described as a duopoly in 2025.
- Migros and Coop in the Swiss supermarket market.

== Media ==
In Finland, the state-owned broadcasting company Yleisradio and the private broadcaster Mainos-TV had a legal duopoly (in the economists' sense of the word) from the 1950s to 1993. No other broadcasters were allowed. Mainos-TV operated by leasing air time from Yleisradio, broadcasting in reserved blocks between Yleisradio's own programming on its two channels. This was a unique phenomenon in the world. Between 1986 and 1992 there was an independent third channel but it was jointly owned by Yle and M-TV; only in 1993 did M-TV get its own channel.

In Kenya, mobile service providers Safaricom and Airtel in Kenya form a duopoly in the Kenyan telecommunications industry.

In Singapore, the mass media industry is presently dominated by two players, namely Mediacorp and SPH Media Trust.

In the United Kingdom, the BBC and ITV formed an effective duopoly (with Channel 4 originally being economically dependent on ITV) until the development of multichannel from the 1990s onwards.

== Broadcasting ==
Duopoly is used in the United States broadcast television and radio industry to refer to a single company owning two outlets in the same city. This usage is technically incompatible with the normal definition of the word and may lead to confusion, inasmuch as there are generally more than two owners of broadcast television stations in markets with broadcast duopolies. In Canada, this definition is therefore more commonly called a "twinstick".

== See also ==
- Monopoly
- Oligopoly
- Two-party system
