= Edgeworth paradox =

Paradox in economics

To solve the Bertrand paradox, the Irish economist Francis Ysidro Edgeworth put forward the Edgeworth Paradox in his paper "The Pure Theory of Monopoly", published in 1897.

In economics, the Edgeworth paradox describes a situation in which two players cannot reach a state of equilibrium with pure strategies, i.e. each charging a stable price. A fact of the Edgeworth Paradox is that in some cases, even if the direct price impact is negative and exceeds the conditions, an increase in cost proportional to the quantity of an item provided may cause a decrease in all optimal prices. Due to the limited production capacity of enterprises in reality, if only one enterprise's total production capacity can be supplied cannot meet social demand, another enterprise can charge a price that exceeds the marginal cost for the residual social need.

== Example ==
Suppose two companies, A and B, sell an identical commodity product, and that customers choose the product solely on the basis of price. Each company faces capacity constraints, in that on its own it cannot satisfy demand at its zero-profit price, but together they can more than satisfy such demand.

The Edgeworth Paradox assumption of the Cournot model is as follows:
1. The production capacity of the two manufacturers is limited. Under a certain price level, the output of a particular Oligopoly cannot meet the market demand at this price level so that another manufacturer can obtain the residual market demand.
2. In a certain period, two prices can exist in the market at the same time.
3. When a particular oligopoly chooses a certain price level, another oligopoly will not immediately respond to the price.

== Edgeworth model ==
Edgeworth's model follows Bertrand's hypothesis, where each seller assumes that the price of its competitor, not its output, remains constant. Suppose there are two sellers, A and B, facing the same demand curve in the market. To explain Edgeworth's model, let us first assume that A is the only seller in the market. Follow the profit maximization rules of the monopolistic seller, and then let B enter the market. B assumes that A will not change its price because he is making the most profit. B sets the price slightly lower than A's price and can sell its total output. At this price, B occupies a large part of the A market.

On the other hand, the sales of Seller A have fallen. To regain the market, A sets the price slightly lower than B's price. And leads to price wars between sellers.

A price war takes the form of a price reduction and continues until the price reaches a specific price. At this price, both A and B can sell all their products. Therefore, this price can be expected to stable. However, according to Edgeworth, prices should be unstable. The reason is simple. Once a specific price set in the market, the seller will discover an interesting fact. This means that every seller is aware that their competitors are selling all of their products and will not change the price. Every seller believes that price can be increased and a net profit can be obtained.

This understanding forms the basis of their actions and reactions. For example, let seller A take the initiative to increase its price by two times. Assuming that A maintains his price, B will find that if he raises the price to a level slightly less than two times, B can sell all his products at a higher price and obtain greater profits. Therefore, B increased the price according to the plan.

Now it's A's turn to understand the situation and react. A finds that his price is higher than that of B, and his total sales have fallen. Therefore, assuming B retains its price, A reduces its price slightly lower than B's price.

Therefore, the price war between A and B starts again. This process will continue indefinitely, and the price will continue to move up and down between 1 and 2 times. Obviously, according to Edgeworth's duopoly model, since price and output are never determined, the equilibrium is unstable and uncertain.

The Edgeworth model shows that the oligopoly price fluctuates between the perfect competition market and the perfect monopoly, and there is no stable equilibrium.

Unlike the Bertrand paradox, the situation of both companies charging zero-profit prices is not an equilibrium, since either company can raise its price and generate profits. Nor is the situation where one company charges less than the other an equilibrium, since the lower price company can profitably raise its price towards the higher price company's price. Nor is the situation where both companies charge the same positive-profit price, since either company can then lower its price marginally and profitably capture more of the market.

== See also ==
- Bertrand–Edgeworth model
- Edgeworth box
