= Differentiated Bertrand competition =

Differentiated Bertrand competition is an economics theory. As a solution to the Bertrand paradox in economics, it has been suggested that each firm produces a somewhat differentiated product, and consequently faces a demand curve that is downward-sloping for all levels of the firm's price.

An increase in a competitor's price is represented as an increase (for example, an upward shift) of the firm's demand curve.

As a result, when a competitor raises price, generally a firm can also raise its own price and increase its profits.

== Calculating the differentiated Bertrand model ==
- q_{1} = firm 1's demand, *q_{1}≥0
- q_{2} = firm 2's demand, *q_{1}≥0
- A_{1} = Constant in equation for firm 1's demand
- A_{2} = Constant in equation for firm 2's demand
- a_{1} = slope coefficient for firm 1's price
- a_{2} = slope coefficient for firm 2's price
- p_{1} = firm 1's price level pr unit
- p_{2} = firm 2's price level pr unit
- b_{1} = slope coefficient for how much firm 2's price affects firm 1's demand
- b_{2} = slope coefficient for how much firm 1's price affects firm 2's demand
- q_{1}=A_{1}-a_{1}*p_{1}+b_{1}*p_{2}
- q_{2}=A_{2}-a_{2}*p_{2}+b_{2}*p_{1}

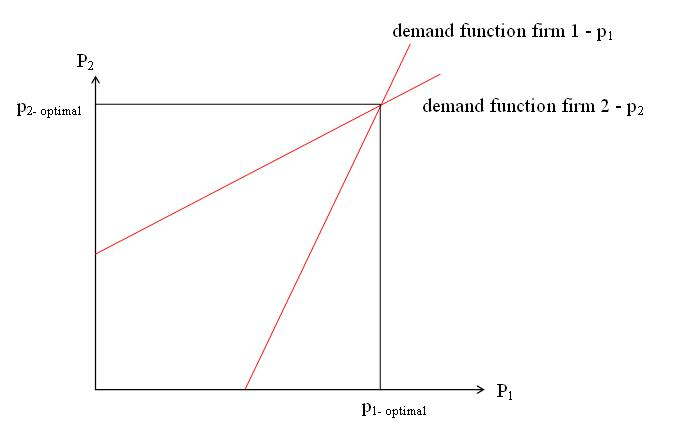

The above figure presents the best response functions of the firms, which are complements to each other.

== Uses ==
Merger simulation models ordinarily assume differentiated Bertrand competition within a market that includes the merging firms.

== See also ==
- Bertrand competition
- Bertrand paradox (economics)
- Oligopoly theory
