= Bertrand–Edgeworth model =

Economic Model

In microeconomics, the Bertrand–Edgeworth model of price-setting oligopoly explores what happens when firms compete to sell a homogeneous product (a good for which consumers buy only from the cheapest available seller) but face limits on how much they can supply. Unlike in the standard Bertrand competition model, where firms are assumed to meet all demand at their chosen price, the Bertrand–Edgeworth model assumes each firm has a capacity constraint: a fixed maximum output it can sell, regardless of price. This constraint may be physical (as in Edgeworth’s formulation) or may depend on price or other conditions.

A key result of the model is that pure-strategy price equilibria may fail to exist, even with just two firms, because firms have an incentive to undercut competitors' prices until they hit their capacity constraints. As a result, the model can lead to price cycles or the emergence of mixed-strategy equilibria, where firms randomize over prices.

== History ==
Joseph Louis François Bertrand (1822–1900) developed the model of Bertrand competition in oligopoly. This approach was based on the assumption that there are at least two firms producing a homogenous product with constant marginal cost (this could be constant at some positive value, or with zero marginal cost as in Cournot). Consumers buy from the cheapest seller. The Bertrand–Nash equilibrium of this model is to have all (or at least two) firms setting the price equal to marginal cost. The argument is simple: if one firm sets a price above marginal cost then another firm can undercut it by a small amount (often called epsilon undercutting, where epsilon represents an arbitrarily small amount) thus the equilibrium is zero (this is sometimes called the Bertrand paradox).

The Bertrand approach assumes that firms are willing and able to supply all demand: there is no limit to the amount that they can produce or sell. Francis Ysidro Edgeworth considered the case where there is a limit to what firms can sell (a capacity constraint): he showed that if there is a fixed limit to what firms can sell, then there may exist no pure-strategy Nash equilibrium (this is sometimes called the Edgeworth paradox).

Martin Shubik developed the Bertrand–Edgeworth model to allow for the firm to be willing to supply only up to its profit maximizing output at the price which it set (under profit maximization this occurs when marginal cost equals price). He considered the case of strictly convex costs, where marginal cost is increasing in output. Shubik showed that if a Nash equilibrium exists, it must be the perfectly competitive price (where demand equals supply, and all firms set price equal to marginal cost). However, this can only happen if market demand is infinitely elastic (horizontal) at the competitive price. In general, as in the Edgeworth paradox, no pure-strategy Nash equilibrium will exist. Huw Dixon showed that in general a mixed strategy Nash equilibrium will exist when there are convex costs. Dixon’s proof used the Existence Theorem of Partha Dasgupta and Eric Maskin. Under Dixon's assumption of (weakly) convex costs, marginal cost will be non-decreasing. This is consistent with a cost function where marginal cost is flat for a range of outputs, marginal cost is smoothly increasing, or indeed where there is a kink in total cost so that marginal cost makes a discontinuous jump upwards.

== Later developments and related models ==
There have been several responses to the non-existence of pure-strategy equilibrium identified by Francis Ysidro Edgeworth and Martin Shubik. Whilst the existence of mixed-strategy equilibrium was demonstrated by Huw Dixon, it has not proven easy to characterize what the equilibrium actually looks like. However, Allen and Hellwig were able to show that in a large market with many firms, the average price set would tend to the competitive price.

It has been argued that non-pure strategies are not plausible in the context of the Bertrand–Edgeworth model. Alternative approaches have included:

- Firms choose the quantity they are willing to sell up to at each price. This is a game in which price and quantity are chosen: as shown by Allen and Hellwig and in a more general case by Huw Dixon that the perfectly competitive price is the unique pure-strategy equilibrium.
- Firms have to meet all demand at the price they set as proposed by Krishnendu Ghosh Dastidar or pay some cost for turning away customers. Whilst this can ensure the existence of a pure-strategy Nash equilibrium, it comes at the cost of generating multiple equilibria. However, as shown by Huw Dixon, if the cost of turning customers away is sufficiently small, then any pure-strategy equilibria that exist will be close to the competitive equilibrium.
- Introducing product differentiation, as proposed by Jean-Pascal Benassy. This is more of a synthesis of monopolistic competition with the Bertrand–Edgeworth model, but Benassy showed that if the elasticity of demand for the firms output is sufficiently high, then any pure strategy equilibrium that existed would be close to the competitive outcome.
- "Integer pricing" as explored by Huw Dixon. Rather than treat price as a continuous variable, it is treated as a discrete variable. This means that firms cannot undercut each other by an arbitrarily small amount, one of the necessary ingredients giving rise to the non-existence of a pure strategy equilibrium. This can give rise to multiple pure-strategy equilibria, some of which may be distant from the competitive equilibrium price. More recently, Prabal Roy Chowdhury has combined the notion of discrete pricing with the idea that firms choose prices and the quantities they want to sell at that price as in Allen–Hellwig.
- Epsilon equilibrium in the pure-strategy game. In an epsilon equilibrium, each firm is within epsilon of its optimal price. If the epsilon is small, this might be seen as a plausible equilibrium, due perhaps to menu costs or bounded rationality. For a given $\varepsilon>0$, if there are enough firms, then an epsilon-equilibrium exists (this result depends on how one models the residual demand – the demand faced by higher-priced firms given the sales of the lower-priced firms).
- Myopic Stable. The Myopic Stable Set of the game offers a solution in pure strategies based on better reply dynamics. When the set of pure-strategy Nash equilibria is nonempty—such as when capacities are either sufficiently large or small—it coincides with the Myopic Stable Set. For intermediate capacity levels, the Nash equilibrium involves mixed strategies. In these cases, all prices within the support of the mixed-strategy equilibrium are included in the Myopic Stable Set. Thus, the Myopic Stable Set provides an alternative and unified foundation for understanding pricing in oligopolistic markets.

== Resources ==
- Edgeworth and modern oligopoly, Theory Xavier Vives
- The Pure Theory of Monopoly, Francis Edgeworth
