= Inframarginal analysis =

Inframarginal analysis is an analytical method in the study of classical economics. Xiaokai Yang created the super marginal analysis method and revived the important thought of division of labour of Adam Smith. The new classical economics reconstructs several independent economic theories with the core of neoclassical economics from the perspective of endogenous individual choice specialization level by means of inframarginal analysis, which is the frontier subject of economics development.

The analysis method based on marginal utility and marginal productivity in modern mainstream economics textbooks is marginal analysis. However, Xiaokai Yang believed that marginal analysis could not solve the problem of division of labour, so he introduced inframarginal analysis. In brief, inframarginal analysis is an analytical method that includes the types of products, the number of manufacturers and transaction costs in the analytical framework.

== Important concepts ==
=== Corner solution ===
The corner solution is a very extreme and special case. It refers to the situation that when consumers do not consume or choose one commodity, but only choose to consume another commodity, their optimal choice is to point to the endpoint of the budget constraint line.

When the corner solution appears, the marginal substitution rate of consumers is not equal to the price ratio of each consumption level in all cases. At this point, consumers can maximize their utility by consuming only one of two goods. In this case, the graph shows that the absolute value of the slope of the utility function is greater than the absolute value of the slope of the budget line.

=== New classical economics ===
New classical economics is a school of thought formed in the 1970s, which refines neoclassical economics. Its theoretical framework consists of rational expectation hypothesis and natural unemployment hypothesis. The school argues that a market economy can automatically solve problems such as unemployment and recession, while government-led stabilization policies have no effect. This differs from monetarism, as the dilemma between unemployment and inflation does not exist only in the long and short run.

New classical economics is proposed by a group of economists led by Australian Chinese economics Yang. They use a nonlinear model and the classical mathematical programming method, and give up important new classical economics theories about the division of labor and the specialization of economic thoughts. They made an equilibrium model, which uses modern analytical tools on classical economics. Their research aims to scientifically find the micro theory of economic growth and establish the micro model based on the macro economic growth. They have changed neoclassical economics from "economics is the knowledge used in the study of the rational allocation of various economic scarce resources" into "economics is the dilemma of the study of economic activities in various conflicts", and find that the primary role of economics is to explore the interaction and evolution process between technology and economic organizations.

The new classical model of organizing experiments is dynamic. The difference between this model and the static model is that people's information about division of labor will evolve spontaneously with the passage of time. The difference with previous dynamic models is that people's knowledge of the division of labor and organization increases gradually with the passage of time. In the analysis framework of new classical economics, the emergence and evolution of division of labor and specialized organizations, including government organizations, are endogenous phenomena. In the view of neoclassical economics and interventionism, various specialized organizations, including government organizations, are exogenous. The analysis of government functions from the perspective of division of labor makes us realize that the so-called "government failure" is a false proposition, just as "market failure" is a false proposition. From the perspective of the evolution of new classical economics, the emergence of government creates new professional and division of labor structures. Government exists when the cost of protecting people's interests through intermediaries is lower than the cost of protecting their own interests. As for the transaction costs of the new division of labor of "government", we should consider the dilemma conflict corresponding to government functions, that is, the government costs from the perspective of emerging classical economics. Combining the significance of division of labor produced by the government with the transaction costs borne by the division of labor, we can see a process of government from gestation, emergence to development. Put the government into the long river of historical development, the government is actually the product of social division of labor, and the government function is the result of specialization.

== The steps of inframarginal analysis ==
The inframarginal analysis is divided into three steps: the first step is to use the optimal mode theorem to exclude those corner points that cannot be the optimal solution. The second step is to use the "marginal analysis" method to solve the remaining combinations (corner point solution) and obtain each local optimal value. The third step is to compare the local maximum objective function values of each combination, and the overall optimal solution is the general equilibrium optimal solution. Thus it can be seen that the ultra-marginal analysis method is not only derived from the marginal analysis, but also includes and surpasses it. Since the new classical economics assumes that people are both consumers and producers, according to the inframarginal analysis, they not only make a marginal choice among the various products they consume, but also make an inframarginal choice among the products they specialize in. In fact, their choices also involve how much to sell, whether to hire workers, and so on.

== Current use ==
=== Labour ===
On the analysis of the inframarginal analysis about the division of time on the latest literature survey, review this framework since 1970s put forward the development of the situation, and discusses the framework and classical ideas in work assignments and other contemporary research project after contact, found the inframarginal analysis for in all areas of workforce management has very important influence.

Published at the same time, international trade, e-commerce, enterprise theory, property rights and contracts, urban economics, national economics, public economics, macroeconomics, and other fields of the latest research results, also shows it is widely used, and proves that the influence of inframarginal analysis to reduce labor cost and the marginal utility of analyzing labor is pretty good.

=== E-commerce ===
In the modern era of rapid development of network business, using ultra-marginal framework to analyze the development of e-commerce and related phenomena, such as bundling, is a very effective analysis method to improve sales performance and reduce marginal cost. In many cases, ultra-marginal network decision making is more important than marginal network decision making. By comparing the role of marginal analysis and ultra-marginal analysis in e-commerce, ultra-marginal analysis provides profound insights for network decision-making, e-commerce and bundled-management on the basis of traditional marginal analysis. The essence of ultra-marginal analysis is the tradeoff between the specialized economy brought by the division of labor network and the trade transaction cost required by the specialization. Which market networks and the associated division of Labour are effective depends on this trade-off. If the transaction efficiency is very low, the positive network effect of the specialized economy or market is to offset the transaction cost, so the self-sufficiency or low level of division of labor, which is with a small network market, is effective and will choose the invisible hand. If transaction efficiency is improved, the level of division of labor and the scale of relevant market network will increase.

== Difference ==
=== Marginal and inframarginal analysis ===
Marginal analysis is a method to study the change of micro increment in economic operation by means of derivative and differential method, and to analyse the relationship between economic variables and the change process. Marginal "extra", namely, the meaning of "additional" refers to is on the edge of the "has been one of the last unit in additional", or "the next unit may be imposed", belongs to the concept of derivative and differential, is refers to the function relations, tiny change of the independent variables, dependent variable in the marginal changes, the marginal value of two micro increment ratio. This analysis method is widely used in the analysis process of economic behaviours and economic variables, such as utility, cost, output, income, profit, consumption, savings, investment, factor efficiency and so on.

Inframarginal analysis is to add a "super" on the basis of marginal analysis, and this "super" is another step. More specifically, it means that before people make the decision of resource allocation, they should first choose specialty and division of labor. The resulting "corner solution" and the "text theorem" used to simplify its analysis must be said to be a great innovation. The "corner solution" is generated when people choose the level of specialization. The corner solution is not considered in neoclassical economics, because its marginal analysis method can only be used to analyze the internal point solution, that is, the resource allocation problem when given the division of labor and the level of specialization.

=== Neoclassical and new classical economics ===
Neoclassical economics refers to the basic theoretical framework of microeconomics and macroeconomics formed after three major revolutionary changes, including the chamberlain revolution, the Keynesian revolution and the rational expectation revolution. This framework is called New classical economics to distinguish it from earlier classical economics.

Concentration of new classical economics fully reflects the modern western mainstream economics over the past 100 years of research results and development characteristics, it pay more attention on the research methods of falsified generalization, the diversification of assumptions and analysis tools of economization in the fields of math, science, research, case using the classic, the marginalization of interdisciplinarity. The academic school is about the theory of distribution. On the basis of equilibrium price theory, Marshall established the theory of distribution according to the factors of production, and the prices of the factors of production also depend on their respective equilibrium prices. These factors of production belong to the owners of labor, land, capital and enterprise organizations.

Xiaokai Yang and other economists adopted the inframarginal analysis method to construct the architecture of New Classical Economics on the basis of sublating Neoclassical Economics. Emerging classical economics from the perspective of labor division evolution, using nonlinear programming and other than the classical mathematical programming methods, will be the new classical economics in the abandoned Classical Economics economic thoughts about the division of labor and specialization, into decision making and equilibrium model, as to explain the root of all economic activity, breaking the traditional barriers between macro and micro economics. Neoclassical economics is "the study of the rational allocation of scarce resources among various economic USES", that is, the study of the allocation of resources under static conditions. However, the core problem of classical economics research represented by Adam Smith is how to overcome the limitation of resource scarcity and increase the supply of scarce resources, that is, how to change the division of labor and evolution of production probability curve. The evolution of division of labor and transaction costs are in conflict. According to this, the new classical economics holds that "economics is the study of all kinds of dilemmas and conflicts in economic activities", and discusses the dilemma and conflict of "division of labor and transaction costs", trying to solve the problem of the split between micro and macro economics.

In addition, economics in the end of the 20th century, the American economist Stiglitz published a new textbook of economics in 1993 as the representative and mark, and began the fourth synthesis. Stiglitz's theoretical innovation lies in: first, the expression of macroeconomics is directly laid on the solid foundation of microeconomics, so as to surpass samuelson's economics. Second, to strengthen the information problem, incentive problem, moral problem, adverse selection problem and other new issues of research and achieve new results and new development; Third, further emphasis on the positive role of government intervention in the economy, relying on government regulation according to law, the market can effectively allocate resources.

The analysis of bipolar world theory points out that neoclassical economics, like neoliberalism, belongs to the economic theories of the capitalist world system in the period of external expansion, which are generated under the general background of insufficient international effective demand. For western developed capitalist countries, the essence is to replace consumption welfare with employment welfare. For developing countries, consumption benefits replace employment benefits.
