= Cournot competition =

Economic model

Cournot competition is an economic model describing an oligopolistic market where firms simultaneously compete by choosing the quantity of goods to produce and sell in the market. It is a static game, whereby a Nash equilibrium is found where no firms desire to unilaterally change their output level when the other firms produce the output levels assigned to them in the (purported) equilibrium.

This model is named after Antoine Cournot, who was inspired to develop a theoretical approach to this setting after observing firm behaviour in a spring water duopoly. The model has the following features:

- There is more than one firm and all firms produce a homogeneous product, i.e., there is no product differentiation;
- No collusion: firms do not cooperate;
- Firms have market power, i.e., each firm's output decision affects the good's price;
- The number of firms is fixed;
- Firms compete in quantities rather than prices; and
- The firms are economically rational and act strategically, usually seeking to maximize profit given their competitors' decisions.

An essential assumption of this model is the "Cournot conjecture" that each firm aims to maximize profits, based on the expectation that its own output decision will not have an effect on the decisions of its rivals. All firms know $N$, the total number of firms in the market, and take the output of the others as given. The market price is set at a level such that demand equals the total quantity produced by all firms. Each firm takes the quantity set by its competitors as a given, evaluates its residual demand, and then behaves as a monopoly.

== History ==
The state of equilibrium... is therefore stable; i.e., if either of the producers, misled as to his true interest, leaves it temporarily, he will be brought back to it.

— Antoine Augustin Cournot, Recherches sur les Principes Mathématiques de la Théorie des Richesses (1838), translated by Bacon (1897).

Antoine Augustin Cournot (1801–1877) first outlined his theory of competition in his 1838 volume Recherches sur les Principes Mathématiques de la Théorie des Richesses as a way of describing the competition with a market for spring water dominated by two suppliers (a duopoly). The model was one of a number that Cournot set out "explicitly and with mathematical precision" in the volume. Specifically, Cournot constructed profit functions for each firm, and then used partial differentiation to construct a function representing a firm's best response for given (exogenous) output levels of the other firm(s) in the market. He then showed that a stable equilibrium occurs where these functions intersect. This is a simultaneous solution such that the corresponding choice in the best response function of each firm.

The consequence of this is that in equilibrium, each firm's expectations of how other firms will act are shown to be correct; when all is revealed, no firm wants to change its output decision. This idea of stability was later taken up and built upon as a description of Nash equilibria, of which Cournot equilibria are a subset.

Cournot's discussion of oligopoly draws on two theoretical advances made earlier in his writing. Both, accepted into microeconomic theory, are particularly important within subfield of industrial organization where Cournot's assumptions can be relaxed to study various market structures and industries. For example, the Stackelberg Competition model is a subset of Cournot's duopoly game. Cournot's discussion of monopoly influenced later writers such as Edward Chamberlin and Joan Robinson during the 1930s revival of interest in imperfect competition.

== Conceptual framework ==
Cournot presents a mathematical analysis of the equilibrium condition in a model of duopolist behaviour. This model is logical.

Cournot's curve of 'demand or sales'

Cournot formalized the notion of aggregated demand as the number of goods sold. Mathematically, it is represented as $D$ = $F(p)$, such that the demand for a commodity is a function of its price. In this model, the demand curve is normally a decreasing function of price, and the total value of the goods sold (that is, the revenue) is represented as $pF(p)$. This revenue function has first derivative $F(p)+pF'(p)$ and second derivative $2F'(p) + pF''(p)$; the second derivative can be assumed to be negative. If so, then a sufficient condition for a maximum is that the derivative of $pF(p)$, i.e., $F(p)+pF'(p) = 0$.

Under the theory, duopolist seeks independently to maximize profits. This restriction is necessary, to ensure firms do not coordinate. Without coordination, each firm attempts to optimize their individual profits by maximizing revenue.

Suppose that there are two owners of mineral water springs, each able to produce unlimited quantities at zero marginal cost. Suppose that instead of selling water to the public they offer it to a middle man. Each proprietor notifies the middle man of the quantity he or she intends to produce. The middle man finds the market-clearing price, which is determined by the demand function $F$ and the aggregate supply. He or she sells the water at this price, passing the proceeds back to the proprietors.

The consumer demand $D$ for mineral water at price $p$ is denoted by $F(p)$; the inverse of $F$ is written $f$ and the market-clearing price is given by $p=f(D)$, where $D=D_1+D_2$ and $D_i$ is the amount supplied by proprietor $i$.

Each proprietor is assumed to know the amount being supplied by their rival, and to adjust their own supply in the light of it to maximize their profits. The position of equilibrium is one in which neither proprietor is inclined to adjust the quantity supplied.

== Finding the equilibrium ==
In a Cournot game, the equilibrium occurs when all firm correctly assumes their rivals' output, and thus chooses a level of output $Q$ that maximize their own profits. In equilibrium, there is no incentive for either firm to change away from this equilibrium output quantity. Note that there exists an subgame perfect equilibrium where firms collude on the monopoly outcome if $\delta$ is sufficiently large.

=== Example 1 ===
Cournot's model of competition is typically presented for the case of a duopoly market structure, whereby two firms share the market power. We assume there is a market consisting of only these two firms, denoted $firm_1$ and $firm_2$. Assume each firm faces the same marginal cost. That is, for a given firm $i$'s output quantity, denoted $q_i$ where $i \in \{1,2\}$, firm $i$'s cost of producing $q_i$ units of output is given by $C(q_i)=\chi q_i$, where $\chi$ is the marginal cost. This assumption tells us that both firms face the same cost-per-unit produced. Therefore, as each firm's profit is equal to its revenues minus costs, where revenue equals the number of units produced multiplied by the market price, we can denote the profit functions for firm 1 and firm 2 as follows:

$$\Pi_1(Q)=p(Q)q_1 - \chi q_1$$
$$\Pi_2(Q)=p(Q)q_2 - \chi q_2$$

In the above profit functions we have price as a function of total output which we denote as $Q$ and for two firms we must have $Q=q_1+q_2$. For example's sake, let us assume that price (inverse demand function) is linear and of the form $p=a-bQ$. So, the inverse demand function can then be rewritten as $p=a-bq_1-bq_2$.

Now, substituting our equation for price in place of $p(Q)$ we can write each firm's profit function as:

$$\Pi_1(q_1,q_2)=(a-bq_1-bq_2- \chi)q_1$$
$$\Pi_2(q_1,q_2)=(a-bq_1-bq_2- \chi)q_2$$

As firms are assumed to be profit-maximizers, the first-order conditions (F.O.C.s) for each firm are:

$$\frac{\partial \Pi_1(q_1,q_2)}{\partial q_1}=a-2bq_1-bq_2-\chi=0$$
$$\frac{\partial \Pi_2(q_1,q_2)}{\partial q_2}=a-bq_1-2bq_2-\chi=0$$

The F.O.C.s state that firm $i$ is producing at the profit-maximizing level of output when the marginal cost ($\text{MC}$) is equal to the marginal revenue ($\text{MR}$). Intuitively, this suggests that firms will produce up to the point where it remains profitable to do so, as any further production past this point will mean that $\text{MC} > \text{MR}$, and therefore production beyond this point results in the firm losing money for each additional unit produced. Notice that at the profit-maximizing quantity where $\text{MC}=\text{MR}$, we must have $\text{MC}-\text{MR}=0$ which is why we set the above equations equal to zero.

Now that we have two equations describing the states at which each firm is producing at the profit-maximizing quantity, we can simply solve this system of equations to obtain each firm's optimal level of output, $q_1,q_2$ for firms 1 and 2 respectively. So, we obtain:

$$q_1=\frac{a-\chi}{2b}-\frac{q_2}{2}$$
$$q_2=\frac{a-\chi}{2b}-\dfrac{q_1}{2}$$

These functions describe each firm's optimal (profit-maximizing) quantity of output given the price firms face in the market, $p$, the marginal cost, $\chi$, and output quantity of rival firms. The functions can be thought of as describing a firm's "Best Response" to the other firm's level of output.

We can now find a Cournot-Nash Equilibrium using our "Best Response" functions above for the output quantity of firms 1 and 2. Recall that both firms face the same cost-per-unit ($\chi$) and price ($p$). Therefore, using this symmetrical relationship between firms we find the equilibrium quantity by fixing $q_1=q_2=q^*$. We can be sure this setup gives us the equilibrium levels as neither firm has an incentive to change their level of output as doing so will harm the firm at the benefit of their rival. Now substituting in $q^*$ for $q_1,q_2$ and solving we obtain the symmetric (same for each firm) output quantity in Equilibrium as $q^*=\frac{a-\chi}{3b}$.

This equilibrium value describes the optimal level of output for firms 1 and 2, where each firm is producing an output quantity of $q^*$. So, at equilibrium, the total market output $Q$ will be $Q=q_1^*+q_2^*=\frac{2(a-\chi)}{3b}$.

=== Example 2 ===
The revenues accruing to the two proprietors are $pD_1$ and $pD_2$, i.e., $f(D_1+D_2) \cdot D_1$ and $f(D_1+D_2) \cdot D_2$. The first proprietor maximizes profit by optimizing over the parameter$D_1$ under his control, giving the condition that the partial derivative of his profit with respect to $D_1$ should be 0, and the mirror-image reasoning applies to their rival. We thus get the equations:

$f(D_1+D_2) + D_1 f'(D_1+D_2) = 0$ and
$$f(D_1+D_2) + D_2 f'(D_1+D_2) = 0$$.

The equlibirum position is found by solving these two equations simultaneously. This is most easily done by adding and subtracting them, turning them into:

$D_1=D_2$ and
$2 f(D) + D f'(D) = 0$, where $D=D_1+D_2$.

Thus, we see that the two proprietors supply equal quantities, and that the total quantity sold is the root of a single nonlinear equation in $D$.

Cournot goes further than this simple solution, investigating the stability of the equilibrium. Each of his original equations defines a relation between $D_1$ and $D_2$ which may be drawn on a graph. If the first proprietor was providing quantity $x_\textsf{l}$, then the second proprietor would adopt quantity $y_\textsf{l}$ from the red curve to maximize their revenue. But then, by similar reasoning, the first proprietor will adjust his supply to $x_\textsf{ll}$ to give him or her the maximum return as shown by the blue curve when $D_2$ is equal to $y_\textsf{l}$. This will lead to the second proprietor adapting to the supply value $y_\textsf{ll}$, and so forth until equilibrium is reached at the point of intersection $i$, whose coordinates are $(x,y)$.

Since proprietors move towards the equilibrium position it follows that the equilibrium is stable, but Cournot remarks that if the red and blue curves were interchanged then this would cease to be true. He adds that it is easy to see that the corresponding diagram would be inadmissible since, for instance, it is necessarily the case that $m_1>m_2$. To verify this, notice that when $D_1$ is 0, the two equations reduce to:

$f(D_2)=0$ and
$$f(D_2) + D_2 f'(D_2) = 0$$.

The first of these corresponds to the quantity $D_2$ sold when the price is zero (which is the maximum quantity the public is willing to consume), while the second states that the derivative of $D_2 f(D_2)$ with respect to $D_2$ is 0, but $D_2 f(D_2)$ is the monetary value of an aggregate sales quantity $D_2$, and the turning point of this value is a maximum. Evidently, the sales quantity which maximizes monetary value is reached before the maximum possible sales quantity (which corresponds to a value of 0). So, the root $m_1$ of the first equation is necessarily greater than the root $m_2$ of the second equation.

=== Comparison with monopoly ===
We have seen that Cournot's system reduces to the equation $2f(D) + Df'(D)=0$. $D$ is functionally related to $p$ via $f$ in one direction and $F$ in the other. If we re-express this equation in terms of $p$, it tells us that $F(p)+2pF'(p)=0$, which can be compared with the equation $F(p)+pF'(p)=0$ obtained earlier for monopoly.

If we plot another variable $u$ against $p$, then we may draw a curve of the function $u=-\frac{F(p)}{F'(p)}$. The monopoly price is the $p$ for which this curve intersects the line $u=p$, while the duopoly price is given by the intersection of the curve with the steeper line $u=2p$. Regardless of the shape of the curve, its intersection with $u=2p$ occurs to the left of (i.e., at a lower price than) its intersection with $u=p$. Hence, prices are lower under duopoly than under monopoly, and quantities sold are accordingly higher.

=== Extension to oligopoly ===
When there are $n$ proprietors, the price equation becomes $F(p)+npF'(p)=0$. The price can be read from the diagram from the intersection of $u=np$ with the curve. Hence, the price diminishes indefinitely as the number of proprietors increases. With an infinite number of proprietors, the price becomes zero; or more generally, if we allow for costs of production, the price becomes the marginal cost.

== Reception in theoretical literature ==
One part of Cournot's original duopoly game was that each firm owner can adjust his supply "en modifiant correctement le prix", or that the price can be adjusted in the same time period by both firms. Francis Edgeworth regarded equality of price in Cournot as "a particular condition, not... abstractly necessary in cases of imperfect competition." A. J. Nichol claimed that Cournot's theory makes no sense unless "prices are directly determined by buyers". Shapiro, perhaps in despair, remarked that "the actual process of price formation in Cournot's theory is somewhat mysterious".

Cournot's economic theory was little noticed until Léon Walras credited him as a forerunner. The French mathematician Joseph Bertrand, when reviewing Walras's Théorie Mathématique de la Richesse Sociale, was drawn to Cournot's book given the acceptance of the theory by Walras himself. Bertrand did criticize Cournot's theory, summarized as:

[Cournot] assumes that one of the proprietors will reduce his price to attract buyers to him, and that the other will in turn reduce his price even more to attract buyers back to him. They will only stop undercutting each other in this way, when either proprietor, even if the other abandoned the struggle, has nothing more to gain from reducing his price. One major objection to this is that there is no solution under this assumption, in that there is no limit to the downward movement... If Cournot's formulation conceals this obvious result, it is because he most inadvertently introduces as D and D' the two proprietors' respective outputs, and by considering them as independent variables, he assumes that should either proprietor change his output then the other proprietor's output could remain constant. It quite obviously could not.

In response to the criticism, Vilfredo Pareto, another influential economist, was unimpressed by Bertrand's critique. Later, Irving Fisher outlined a model of duopoly that was in line with Bertrand's critique, and not Cournot's original model, stating:

A more natural hypothesis, and one often tacitly adopted, is that each [producer] assumes his rival's price will remain fixed, while his own price is adjusted. Under this hypothesis each would undersell the other as long as any profit remained, so that the final result would be identical with the result of unlimited competition.

Fisher regarded Bertrand as the first to identify this model, and it has since been referred to as Bertrand competition. Today, this duopoly theory is a key model in game theory, and has application in modern economics for understanding oligopolies.

== See also ==
- Aggregative game
- Bertrand competition
- Bertrand–Edgeworth model
- Game theory
- Nash equilibrium
- Stackelberg competition
- Tacit collusion

== Sources ==
- de Bornier, Jean Magnan (1992). "The "Cournot-Bertrand Debate": A Historical Perspective" (PDF). History of Political Economy. 24 (3). Duke University Press: 623–656. doi:10.1215/00182702-24-3-623.
- Fisher, Irving (1898). "Cournot and mathematical economics". The Quarterly Journal of Economics. 12 (2). Oxford University Press: 119–138. doi:10.2307/1882115. JSTOR 1882115.
