= Francis Ysidro Edgeworth =

Irish economist (1845–1926)

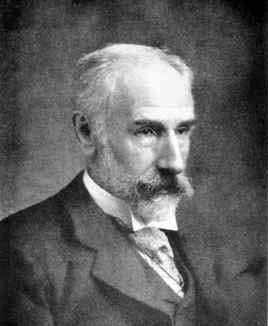
- Born: 8 February 1845; Edgeworthstown, County Longford, Ireland
- Died: 13 February 1926 (aged 81); Oxford, Oxfordshire, England
- Education: Trinity College, Dublin; Balliol College, Oxford
- Awards: Guy Medal (Gold, 1907)
- Scientific career
- Fields: Philosophy, political economist

Francis Ysidro Edgeworth FBA (8 February 1845 – 13 February 1926) was an Anglo-Irish philosopher and political economist who made significant contributions to the methods of statistics during the 1880s. From 1891 onward, he was appointed the founding editor of The Economic Journal.

== Life ==
Ysidro Francis Edgeworth – the order of his forenames later reversed – was born in Edgeworthstown, County Longford, Ireland, the son of Francis Beaufort Edgeworth and his wife, Rosa Florentina, daughter of exiled Catalan general Antonio Eroles. Francis Beaufort Edgeworth, when "a restless philosophy student at Cambridge on his way to Germany", had met Rosa, a teenage Spanish refugee, on the steps of the British Museum, and they subsequently eloped. Francis Beaufort Edgeworth was the son of politician, writer, and inventor Richard Lovell Edgeworth (father also of the writer Maria Edgeworth), by his fourth wife, the botanical artist and memoirist Frances Anne, daughter of the Anglican clergyman and geographer Daniel Augustus Beaufort, of French Huguenot origin. The Edgeworth family, which settled in Ireland in the 1580s, was distinguished, descending from Francis Edgeworth, joint Clerk of the Crown and Hanaper in 1606, who inherited a fortune from his brother Edward Edgeworth, Bishop of Down and Connor. Richard Lovell Edgeworth was a descendant, through his mother, of the English judge Sir Salathiel Lovell.

The youngest of seven children, Edgeworth did not attend school, but was educated by private tutors at the Edgeworthstown estate until he reached the age to enter university.

As a student at Trinity College Dublin he studied classics getting a scholarship in 1863 and graduating in 1865. In 1867, he went to Oxford and was admitted to Balliol College, Oxford in 1868. At Oxford, Edgeworth studied ancient and modern languages. During his studies, he was influenced by Jeremy Bentham's writings.

A voracious autodidact, he studied mathematics and economics only after he had completed university. He qualified as a barrister in London in 1877 but did not practise.

On the basis of his publications in economics and mathematical statistics in the 1880s, Edgeworth was appointed to a chair in economics at King's College London in 1888, and in 1891, he was appointed Drummond Professor of Political Economy at Oxford University. In 1891, he was also appointed the founding editor of The Economic Journal. He continued as editor or joint-editor until his death 35 years later.

The Royal Statistical Society awarded him the Guy Medal in Gold in 1907. Edgeworth served as the president of the Royal Statistical Society, 1912–14. In 1928, Arthur Lyon Bowley published a book entitled and devoted to F. Y. Edgeworth's Contributions to Mathematical Statistics.

== Contributions to economics ==
Edgeworth was a highly influential figure in the development of neo-classical economics. He was the first to apply certain formal mathematical techniques to individual decision making in economics. He developed utility theory, introducing the indifference curve and the famous Edgeworth box, which is now familiar to undergraduate students of microeconomics. He is also known for the Edgeworth conjecture, which states that the core of an economy shrinks to the set of competitive equilibria as the number of agents in the economy gets larger. In statistics, Edgeworth is most prominently remembered by having his name on the Edgeworth series.

Though Edgeworth's economic ideas were original and in depth, his contemporaries frequently complained of his manner of expression for lack of clarity. He was prone to verbosity and coining obscure words without providing definition for the reader.

=== Mathematical Psychics (1881) ===
His most original and creative book on economics was Mathematical Psychics: An Essay on the Application of Mathematics to the Moral Sciences, published in 1881 at the beginning of his long career in the subject.

In the book, he criticised Jevons's theory of barter exchange, showing that under a system of "recontracting" there will be, in fact, many solutions, an "indeterminacy of contract". Edgeworth's "range of final settlements" was later resurrected by Martin Shubik (1959) to be the game-theoretic concept of "the core". The book contained the first instance of the indifference curve, as level sets of the generalised utility function, U(x, y, z, ...).

The book was notoriously difficult to read. He frequently referenced literary sources and interspersed the writing with passages in a number of languages, including Latin, French and Ancient Greek. The mathematics was similarly difficult, and a number of his creative applications of mathematics to economic or moral issues were judged as incomprehensible. However, one of the most influential economists of the time, Alfred Marshall, commented in his review of Mathematical Psychics:

This book shows clear signs of genius, and is a promise of great things to come... His readers may sometimes wish that he had kept his work by him a little longer till he had worked it out a little more fully, and obtained that simplicity which comes only through long labour. But taking it as what it claims to be, 'a tentative study', we can only admire its brilliancy, force, and originality.

Edgeworth's close friend, William Stanley Jevons, said of Mathematical Psychics:

Whatever else readers of this book may think about it, they would probably all agree that it is a very remarkable one.... There can be no doubt that in the style of his composition Mr. Edgeworth does not do justice to his matter. His style, if not obscure, is implicit, so that the reader is left to puzzle out every important sentence like an enigma.

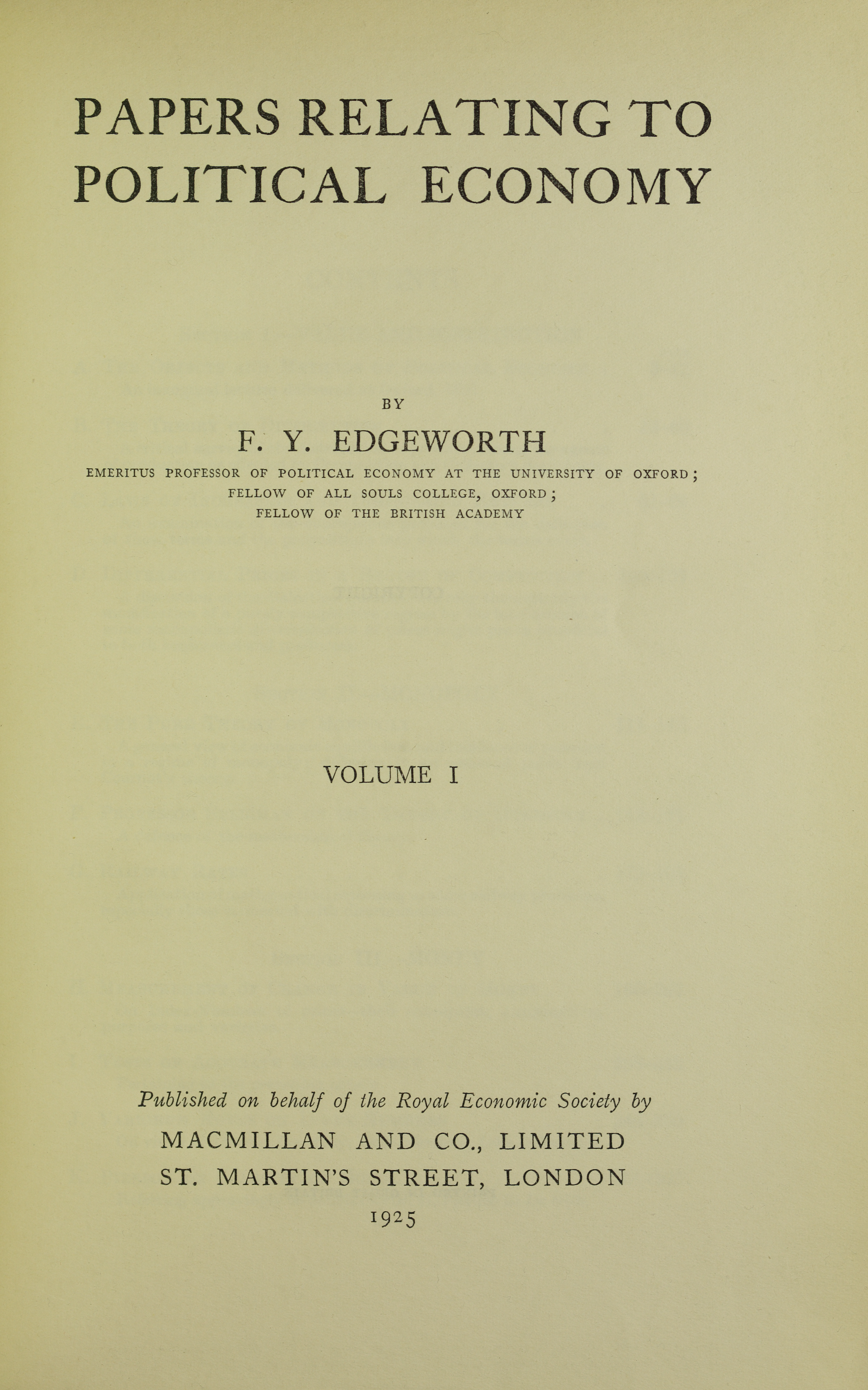
Papers relating to political economy, 1925

=== Edgeworth's limit theorem ===
When the number of agents in an economy increases, the degree of indeterminacy is reduced. In the limit case of an infinite number of agents (perfect competition), the set of possible contract becomes fully determinate and identical to the 'equilibrium' of economists. The only way of resolving this indeterminacy of contract would be to appeal to the utilitarian principle of maximising the sum of the utilities of traders over the range of final settlements.

=== International trade ===
He was the first one to use offer curves and community indifference curves to illustrate its main propositions, including the "optimal tariff".

=== Taxation paradox ===
In what became known as the taxation paradox, Edgeworth found that the taxation of a good could result in a decrease in price. He used the example of pricing for rail passengers, where a tax on first-class tickets could result in lower prices for both first-class and regular class passengers.

He set the utilitarian foundations for highly progressive taxation, arguing that the optimal distribution of taxes should be such that 'the marginal disutility incurred by each taxpayer should be the same' (Edgeworth, 1897).

=== Monopoly pricing ===
In 1897, in an article on monopoly pricing, Edgeworth criticised Cournot's exact solution to the duopoly problem with quantity adjustments as well as Bertrand's "instantly competitive" result in a duopoly model with price adjustment. At the same time, Edgeworth showed how price competition between two firms with capacity constraints and/or rising marginal cost curves resulted in indeterminacy. This gave rise to the Bertrand–Edgeworth model of oligopoly.

=== Marginal productivity theory ===
Edgeworth criticised the marginal productivity theory in several articles (1904, 1911), and tried to refine the neo-classical theory of distribution on a more solid basis. Although his work in questions of war finance during World War I was original, they were a bit too theoretical and did not achieve the practical influence he had hoped.

== Publications ==
=== Collections/selections ===
- F. Y. Edgeworth (1925) Papers relating to political economy 3 vols. Available online at Gallica
- Mirowski, Philip (1994). Edgeworth on Chance, Economic Hazard, and Statistics. Rowman & Littlefield. ISBN 978-0-8476-7751-1.
- Charles R. McCann Jr. (ed.) (1966) F.Y. Edgeworth: Writings in Probability, Statistics and Economics, 3 vols. Cheltenham, Glos.: Elgar.
- F. Y. Edgeworth (2003). Peter Newman (ed.). F.Y. Edgeworth : Mathematical Psychics and Further Papers on Political Economy. Oxford University Press. ISBN 978-0-19-828712-4.

=== Individual works ===
- "Mr. Matthew Arnold on Bishop Butler's Doctrine of Self-Love", 1876, Mind
- New and Old Methods of Ethics, 1877.
- "The Hedonical Calculus", 1879, Mind, pp. 394–408
- Mathematical Psychics: An Essay on the Application of Mathematics to the Moral Sciences. Kegan Paul. 1881.
- "Mr. Leslie Stephen on Utilitarianism", 1882, Mind
- "The Law of Error", 1883, Phil Mag, pp. 300–309
- "The Method of Least Squares", 1883, Phil Mag
- "The Physical Basis of Probability", 1883, Phil Mag
- "On the Method of Ascertaining a Change in the Value of Gold", 1883, JRSS
- "Review of Jevons's Investigations", 1884, Academy
- "The Rationale of Exchange", 1884, JRSS
- "The Philosophy of Chance", 1884, Mind
- "On the Reduction of Observations", 1884, Phil Mag, pp. 135–141
- "A Priori Probabilities", 1884, Phil Mag
- "Chance and Law", 1884, Hermathena, pp. 154–163
- "Methods of Statistics", 1885, Jubilee Volume of RSS.
- "The Calculus of Probabilities Applied to Psychic Research, I & II", 1885, 1886, Proceedings of Society for Psychic Research
- "On Methods of Ascertaining Variations in the Rate of Births, Deaths and Marriages", 1885, JRSS
- "Progressive Means", 1886, JRSS
- "The Law of Error and the Elimination of Chance", 1886 Phil Mag
- "On the Determination of the Modulus of Errors", 1886, Phil Mag
- "Problems in Probabilities", 1886, Phil Mag
- "Review of Sidgwick's Scope and Method", 1886, Academy
- "Review of Jevons's Journals", 1886, Academy
- "Four Reports by the committee investigating best method of ascertaining and measuring variations in the monetary standard", 1887, Reports of the BAAS (Parts I & 3; Part 2)
- "Observations and Statistics: An essay on the theory of errors of observation and the first principles of statistics", 1887, Transactions of Cambridge Society.
- Metretike, or the method of measuring probability and utility, 1887.
- "On Observations Relating to Several Quantities", 1887, Hermathena
- "The Law of Error", 1887, Nature
- "The Choice of Means", 1887, Phil Mag
- "On Discordant Observations", 1887, Phil Mag
- "The Empirical Proof of the Law of Error", 1887, Phil Mag
- "On a New Method of Reducing Observations Relating to Several Quantities", 1888, Phil Mag
- "New Methods of Measuring Variation in General Prices, 1888, JRSS
- "The Statistics of Examinations", 1888, JRSS
- "The Value of Authority Tested by Experiment", 1888, Mind
- "Mathematical Theory of Banking", 1888, JRSS
- "On the Application of Mathematics to Political Economy: Address of the President of Section F of the British Association for the Advancement of Science", 1889, JRSS
- "The Mathematical Theory of Political Economy: Review of Walras's Elements", 1889, Nature
- "Review of Wicksteed's Alphabet", 1889, Academy
- "Review of Bohm-Bawerk's Kapital und Kapitalismus", 1889, Academy
- "Review of Bertrand's Calcul des Probabilites", 1889, J of Education
- "Points at which Mathematical Reasoning is Applicable to Political Economy", 1889, Nature
- "Appreciation of Gold", 1889, QJE
- "The Element of Chance in Competitive Examinations", 1890, JRSS
- "Economic Science and Statistics", 1889, Nature
- "Review of Marshall's Principles", 1890, Nature
- "Review of Jevons's Pure Logic", 1890, Academy
- "Review of Walras's Elements", 1890, Academy
- "Review of Bohm-Bawerk's Capital and Interest", 1890, Academy
- "La Théorie mathématique de l'offre et de la demande et le côut de production", 1891, Revue d'Economie Politique
- "Osservazioni sulla teoria matematica dell' economica politica", 1891, GdE (trans. "On the Determinateness of Economic Equilibrium")
- "Ancora a proposito della teoria del baratto", 1891, GdE
- "Review of Ricardo's Principles", 1891, J of Education
- "The British Economic Association", 1891, In: The Economic Journal (EJ), Vol. 1, pp. 1–14 (in Wikisource)
- "Review of Keynes's Scope and Method", 1891, EJ
- "An Introductory Lecture on Political Economy", 1891, EJ
- "Review of Sidgwick's Elements of Politics", 1891, EJ
- "Review of Second Edition of Marshall's Principles", 1891, EJ
- "Mathematical Investigations in the Theory of Value and Prices," Connecticut Academy, 1892.
- "Correlated Averages", 1892, Phil Mag
- "The Law of Error and Correlated Averages", 1892, Phil Mag.
- "Recent Attempts to Evaluate the Amount of Coin Circulating in a Country", 1892, EJ
- "Review of Marshall's Economics of Industry", 1892, Nature
- "Review of Cantillon's Essai", 1892, EJ
- "Review of Palgrave's Dictionary", 1892, EJ
- "Review of Bohm-Bawerk's Positive Theory of Capital", 1892, EJ
- "Review of Smart's Introduction to the Theory of Value", 1892, EJ
- "Review of Dusing's Das Geschlechtverhaltniss", 1892, EJ
- "Review of Benson's Capital, Labor and Trade", 1892, EJ
- "Review of Smart's Women's Wages", 1893
- "Review of Bonar's Philosophy", 1893, Mind
- "Review of Walsh's Bimetallism", 1893, EJ
- "Review of Fisher's Mathematical Investigations", 1893, EJ
- "Professor Böhm-Bawerk on the Ultimate Standard of Value", 1894, EJ
- "One More Word on the Ultimate Standard of Value", 1894, EJ
- "Review of Wiser's Natural Value", 1894, EJ
- "Theory of International Values: Parts I, II and III", 1894, EJ
- "Recent Writings on Index Numbers", 1894, EJ
- "The Measurement of Utility by Money", 1894, EJ
- "Asymmetric Correlation between Social Phenomenon", 1894, JRSS
- Entries: "Average", "Census", "Cournot", "Curves", "Demand Curves", Difficulty of Attainment", "Distance in Time", "Error", 1894, in Palgrave, editor, Dictionary of Political Economy, Vol. 1.
- "Review of the Webbs' History of Trade Unionism", 1894, EJ
- "Review of Third Edition of Marshall's Principles", 1895, EJ
- "Mr. Pierson on the Scarcity of Gold", 1895, EJ
- "Thoughts on Monetary Reform", 1895, EJ
- "The Stationary State in Japan", 1895, EJ
- "A Defense of Index-Numbers", 1896, EJ
- "Statistics on Unprogressive Communities", 1896, JRSS
- "The Asymmetrical Probability Curve (Abstract)", 1894, Proceedings of the Royal Society
- "The Asymmetrical Probability Curve", 1896, Phil Mag
- "The Compound law of Error", 1896, Phil Mag
- Entries: "Gossen", "Index Numbers", "Intrinsic Value", "Jenkin", "Jennings", "Least Squares" and "Mathematical Method", 1896, in Palgrave, editor, Dictionary of Political Economy, Vol. 2.
- "Review of Price's Money", 1896, EJ
- "Review of Nicholson's Strikes and Social Problems", 1896, EJ
- "Review of Pierson's Leerboek, Vol. 1", 1896, EJ
- "Review of Pierson's Leerkook, Vol. 2", 1897, EJ
- "Review of Bastable, Theory of International Trade", 1897, EJ
- "Review of Grazani's Istituzioni", 1897, EJ
- "La teoria pura del monopolio", 1897, GdE, (trans."The Pure Theory of Monopoly")
- "The Pure Theory of Taxation: Parts I, II and III", 1897, EJ
- "Miscellaneous Applications of the Calculus of Probabilities", Parts 1, 2, 3, 1897, 1898, JRSS
- "Review of Cournot's Recherches", 1898, EJ
- "Professor Graziani on the Mathematical Theory of Monopoly", 1898, EJ
- "Review of Darwin's Bimetallism", 1898, EJ
- "On the Representation of Statistics by Mathematical Formulae", Part 1 (1898), Parts 2, 3, 4 (1899)
- "On a Point in the Theory of International Trade", 1899, EJ
- "Review of Davidson, Bargain Theory of Wages", 1899, EJ
- "Professor Seligman on the Mathematical Method in Political Economy", 1899, EJ
- Entries: "Pareto", "Pareto's Law", "Probability", Supply Curve" and "Utility", 1899, in Palgrave, editor, Dictionary of Political Economy, Vol. 3
- "Answers to Questions by Local Taxation Commission", 1899, Reprint of Royal Commission for Local Taxation
- "The Incidence of Urban Rates, Parts I, II and III" 1900, EJ
- "Defence of Mr. Harrison's Calculation of the Rupee Circulation", 1900, EJ
- "Review of J.B. Clark's Theory of Distribution", 1900, EJ
- "Review of Smart's Taxation of Land-Values", 1900, EJ
- "Review of Bastable, Theory of International Trade (3rd edition)", 1897, EJ
- "Review of Bonar and Hollander, Letters of Ricardo", 1900, EJ
- "Mr. Walsh on the Measurement of General Exchange Value", 1901, EJ
- "Disputed Points in the Theory of International Trade", 1901, EJ
- "Review of Gide's Cooperation", 1902, EJ
- "Review of Wells's Anticipations", 1902, EJ
- "Methods of Representing Statistics of Wages and Other Groups Not *"Fulfilling the Normal Law of Error", with A.L. Bowley, 1902, JRSS
- "The Law of Error", 1902, Encycl Britannica
- "Review of Cannan's History of Theories of Production", 1903, EJ
- "Review of Bortkiewicz's Anwendungen and Pareto's Anwendungen", 1903, EJ
- "Review of Bastable's Public Finance", 1903, EJ
- "Review of Bastable's Cartels et Trusts", 1903, EJ
- "Review of Pigou's Riddle of the Tariff", 1904, EJ
- "Review of Nicholson's Elements", 1904, EJ
- "Review of Bowley's National Progress", 1904, EJ
- "Review of Plunkett's Ireland", 1904, EJ
- "Review of Northon's Loan Credit", 1904, EJ
- "Review of Graziani's Istituzione", 1904, EJ
- "Review of Dietzel's Vergeltungzolle", 1904, EJ
- "Preface", 1904, in J.R. MacDonald, editor, Women in the Printing Trades.
- "The Theory of Distribution", 1904, QJE
- "The Law of Error", 1905, Transactions of Cambridge Society
- "Review of Nicholson's History of English Corn Laws", 1905, EJ
- "Review of Cunynghame's Geometrical Political Economy", 1905, EJ
- "Review of Carver's Theory of Distribution", 1905, EJ
- "Review of Taussig's Present Position", 1905, EJ
- "Review of Henry Sidgwick: A memoir", 1906, EJ
- "The Generalised Law of Error, or Law of Great Numbers", 1906, JRSS
- "Recent Schemes for Rating Urban Land Values", 1906, EJ
- "On the Representation of Statistical Frequency by a Series", 1907, JRSS
- "Statistical Observations on Wasps and Bees", 1907, Biometrika
- "Review of de Foville's Monnaie and Guyot's Science economique", 1907, EJ
- "Appreciations of Mathematical Theories", Parts I & II (1907), Parts III & IV (1908), EJ
- "On the Probable Errors of Frequency Constants", I, II & III (1908), Add. (1909), JRSS
- "Review of Andreades's Lecture on the Census", 1908, EJ
- "Review of Rea's Free Trade", 1908, EJ
- "Review of Withers's Meaning of Money", 1909, EJ
- "Review of Mitchell's Gold Prices", 1909, EJ
- "Review of Jevons's Investigations", 1909, EJ
- "Application du calcul des probabilités à la Statistique", 1909, Bulletin de l'Institut international de statistique
- "On the Use of the Differential Calculus in Economics to Determine Conditions of Maximum Advantage", 1909, Scientia
- "Applications of Probabilities to Economics, Parts I & II", 1910, EJ.
- "The Subjective Element in the First Principles of Taxation", 1910, QJE
- "Review of John Stuart Mill's Principles", 1910, EJ
- "Review of Colson's Cours", 1910, EJ
- "Review of J. Maurice Clark's Local Freight Discriminations", 1910, EJ
- "Review of Hammond's Railway Rate Theories", 1911, EJ
- "Probability and Expectation", 1911, Encycl Britannica
- "Monopoly and Differential Prices", 1911, EJ
- "Contributions to the Theory of Railway Rates", Part I & II (1911), Part III (1912), Part IV (1913), EJ
- "Review of Moore's Laws of Wages", 1912, EJ
- "Review of Pigou's Wealth and Welfare", 1913, EJ
- "On the Use of the Theory of Probabilities in Statistics Relating to Society", 1913, J of RSS
- "A Variant Proof of the Distribution of Velocities in a Molecular Chaos", 1913, PhilMag
- "On the Use of Analytical Geometry to Represent Certain Kinds of Statistics", Parts I–V, 1914, J of RSS
- "Recent Contributions to Mathematical Economics, I & II", 1915, EJ
- On the Relations of Political Economy to War, 1915.
- The Cost of War and ways of reducing it suggested by economic theory, 1915.
- "Economists on War: Review of Sombart, etc.", 1915, EJ
- "Review of Pigou's Economy and Finance of War", 1916, EJ
- "Review of Preziosi's La Germania alla Conquista dell' Italia", 1916, EJ
- "British Incomes and Property", 1916, EJ
- "On the Mathematical Representation of Statistical Data", Part I (1916), Parts II–IV (1917), J of RSS
- "Review of Gill's National Power and Prosperity", 1917, EJ
- "Review of Lehfeldt's Economics in Light of War", 1917, EJ
- "Some German Economic Writings about the War", 1917, EJ
- "After-War Problems: Review of Dawson at al.", 1917, EJ
- "Review of Westergaard's Scope and Methods of Statistics", 1917, JRSS
- "Review of Anderson's Value of Money", 1918, EJ
- "Review of Moulton and Phillips on Money and Banking", 1918, EJ
- "Review of Loria's Economic Causes of War", 1918, EJ
- "Review of Arias's Principii", 1918, EJ
- "Review of Smith-Gordon, Rural Reconstruction of Ireland and Russell's National Being", 1918, EJ
- "On the Value of a Mean as Calculated from a Sample", 1918, EJ
- "An Astronomer on the Law of Error", 1918, PhilMag
- Currency and Finance in Time of War, 1918.
- "The Doctrine of Index-Numbers According to Prof. Wesley Mitchell", 1918, EJ
- "Psychical Research and Statistical Method", 1919, JRSS
- "Methods of Graduating Taxes on Income and Capital", 1919, EJ
- "Review of Cannan's Money", 1919, EJ
- "Review of Andreades's Historia", 1919, EJ
- "Review of Lehfeldt's Gold Prices", 1919, EJ
- A Levy on Capital for the Discharge of the Debt, 1919.
- "Mathematical Formulae and the National Commission on Income Tax", 1920, EJ
- "On the Application of Probabilities to the Movement of Gas Molecules", Part I (1920), Part II (1922), Phil Mag
- "Entomological Statistics", 1920, Metron, pp. 75–80
- "Review of Gustav Cassel's Theory of Social Economy", 1920, EJ
- "Review of Bowley's Change in Distribution of National Income", 1920, JRSS
- "Review of the Webbs' History of Trade Unionism", 1920, EJ
- "Molecular Statistics", Part I (1921), Part II (1922), JRSS
- "On the Genesis of the Law of Eror", 1921, PhilMag
- "The Philosophy of Chance", 1922, Mind
- "The Mathematical Economics of Professor Amoroso", 1922, EJ
- "Equal Pay to Men and Women for Equal Work", 1922, EJ
- "Review of Keynes's Treatise on Probability", 1922, JRSS
- "Review of Pigou's Political Economy of War", 1922, EJ
- "Statistics of Examinations", 1923, JRSS
- "On the Use of Medians for Reducing Observations Relating to Several Quantities", 1923, Phil Mag
- "Mr. Correa Walsh on the Calculation of Index Numbers", 1923, JRSS
- "Index Numbers According to Mr. Walsh", 1923, EJ
- "Women's Wages in Relation to Economic Welfare", 1923, EJ

Also available as: Edgeworth, F.Y. (1995), "Women's Wages in Relation to Economic Welfare", in Humphries, Jane (ed.), Gender and economics, Aldershot, England Brookfield, Vermont, USA: Edward Elgar, pp. 99–112, ISBN 9781852788438.

- "Review of Marshall's Money, Credit and Commerce", 1923, EJ
- "Review of The Labour Party's Aim", 1923, EJ
- "Review of Bowley's Mathematical Groundwork", 1924, EJ
- "Review of Fisher's Economic Position of the Married Woman", 1924, EJ
- "Untried Methods of Representing Frequency", 1924, JRSS
- Papers Relating to Political Economy, 3 volumes, 1925.
- "The Plurality of Index-Numbers", 1925, EJ
- "The Element of Probability in Index-Numbers", 1925, JRSS
- "The Revised Doctrine of Marginal Social Product", 1925, EJ
- "Review of J.M. Clark's Overhead Costs", 1925, EJ.
- "mathematical method in political economy," 1926, Palgrave's Dictionary of Political Economy, reprinted in 1987, The New Palgrave: A Dictionary of Economics, v. 3.
- "Mr Rhode's Curve and the Method of Adjustment", 1926, JRSS
