= Hotelling =

Hotelling may refer to:

- Hoteling, an office organization method
- Harold Hotelling, American statistician and economist, for whom the following entries are named:
  - Hotelling's rule an economic rule regarding the prices of non-renewable natural resources
  - Hotelling's lemma an economic rule relating the supply of a good to the profit of the good's producer
  - Hotelling's law, an economic principle regarding competition
  - Hotelling's T-squared distribution, a probability distribution
