= Natural resource economics =

Supply, demand and allocation of the Earth's natural resources

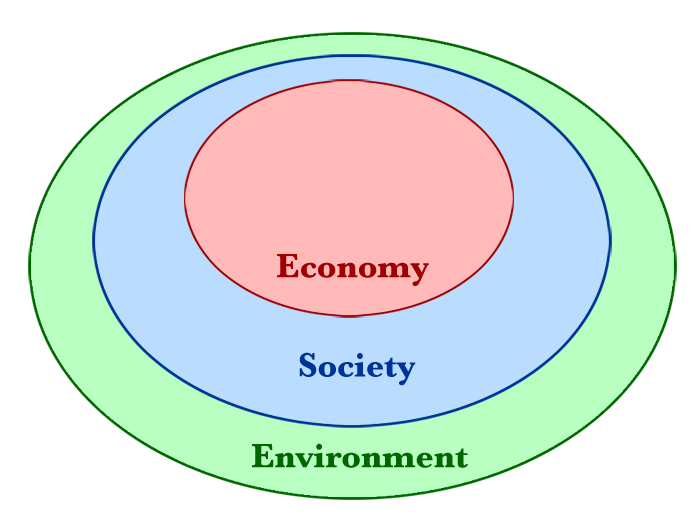
Three circles enclosed within one another showing how both economy and society are subsets of our planetary ecological system. This view is useful for correcting the misconception, sometimes drawn from the previous "three pillars" diagram, that portions of social and economic systems can exist independently from the environment.

The three pillars of sustainability.
Click on image areas for more information.

Natural resource economics deals with the supply, demand, and allocation of the Earth's natural resources. One main objective of natural resource economics is to better understand the role of natural resources in the economy in order to develop more sustainable methods of managing those resources to ensure their availability for future generations. Resource economists study interactions between economic and natural systems, with the goal of developing a sustainable and efficient economy.

== Areas of discussion ==
Natural resource economics is a transdisciplinary field of academic research within economics that aims to address the connections and interdependence between human economies and natural ecosystems. Its focus is how to operate an economy within the ecological constraints of earth's natural resources. Resource economics brings together and connects different disciplines within the natural and social sciences connected to broad areas of earth science, human economics, and natural ecosystems. Economic models must be adapted to accommodate the special features of natural resource inputs. The traditional curriculum of natural resource economics emphasized fisheries models, forestry models, and mineral extraction models (i.e. fish, trees, and ore). In recent years, however, other resources, notably air, water, the global climate, and "environmental resources" in general have become increasingly important to policy-making.

Academic and policy interest has now moved beyond simply the optimal commercial exploitation of the standard trio of resources to encompass management for other objectives. For example, natural resources more broadly have defined recreational, as well as commercial values. They may also contribute to overall social welfare levels, by their mere existence.

The economics and policy area focuses on the human aspects of environmental problems. Traditional areas of environmental and natural resource economics include welfare theory, land/location use, pollution control, resource extraction, and non-market valuation, and also resource exhaustibility, sustainability, environmental management, and environmental policy. Research topics could include the environmental impacts of agriculture, transportation and urbanization, land use in poor and industrialized countries, international trade and the environment, climate change, and methodological advances in non-market valuation, to name just a few.

Hotelling's rule is a 1938 economic model of non-renewable resource management by Harold Hotelling. It shows that efficient exploitation of a nonrenewable and nonaugmentable resource would, under otherwise stable economic conditions, lead to a depletion of the resource. The rule states that this would lead to a net price or "Hotelling rent" for it that rose annually at a rate equal to the rate of interest, reflecting the increasing scarcity of the resource. Nonaugmentable resources of inorganic materials (i.e. minerals) are uncommon; most resources can be augmented by recycling and by the existence and use of substitutes for the end-use products (see below).

Vogely has stated that the development of a mineral resource occurs in five stages: (1) The current operating margin (rate of production) governed by the proportion of the reserve (resource) already depleted. (2) The intensive development margin governed by the trade-off between the rising necessary investment and quicker realization of revenue. (3) The extensive development margin in which extraction is begun of known but previously uneconomic deposits. (4) The exploration margin in which the search for new deposits (resources) is conducted and the cost per unit extracted is highly uncertain with the cost of failure having to be balanced against finding usable resources (deposits) that have marginal costs of extraction no higher than in the first three stages above. (5) The technology margin which interacts with the first four stages. The Gray-Hotelling (exhaustion) theory is a special case, since it covers only Stages 1–3 and not the far more important Stages 4 and 5.

Simon has stated that the supply of natural resources is infinite (i.e. perpetual)

These conflicting views will be substantially reconciled by considering resource-related topics in depth in the next section, or at least minimized.

Furthermore, Hartwick's rule provides insight to the sustainability of welfare in an economy that uses non-renewable resources.

== Perpetual resources vs. exhaustibility ==
=== Background and introduction ===
The perpetual resource concept is a complex one because the concept of resource is complex and changes with the advent of new technology (usually more efficient recovery), new needs, and to a lesser degree with new economics (e.g. changes in prices of the material, changes in energy costs, etc.). On the one hand, a material (and its resources) can enter a time of shortage and become a strategic and critical material (an immediate exhaustibility crisis), but on the other hand a material can go out of use, its resource can proceed to being perpetual if it was not before, and then the resource can become a paleoresource when the material goes almost completely out of use (e.g. resources of arrowhead-grade flint). Some of the complexities influencing resources of a material include the extent of recyclability, the availability of suitable substitutes for the material in its end-use products, plus some other less important factors.

The Federal Government suddenly became compellingly interested in resource issues on December 7, 1941, shortly after which Japan cut the U.S. off from tin and rubber and made some other materials, such as tungsten, very difficult to obtain. This was the worst case for resource availability, becoming a strategic and critical material. After the war a government stockpile of strategic and critical materials was set up, having around 100 different materials that were purchased for cash or obtained by trading off U.S. agricultural commodities for them. In the longer term, scarcity of tin later led to completely substituting aluminum foil for tin foil and polymer lined steel cans and aseptic packaging substituting for tin electroplated steel cans.

Resources change over time with technology and economics; more efficient recovery leads to a drop in the ore grade needed. The average grade of the copper ore processed has dropped from 4.0% copper in 1900 to 1.63% in 1920, 1.20% in 1940, 0.73% in 1960, 0.47% in 1980, and 0.44% in 2000.

Cobalt had been in an iffy supply status ever since the Belgian Congo (world's only significant source of cobalt) was given a hasty independence in 1960 and the cobalt-producing province seceded as Katanga, followed by several wars and insurgencies, local government removals, railroads destroyed, and nationalizations. This was topped off by an invasion of the province by Katangan rebels in 1978 that disrupted supply and transportation and caused the cobalt price to briefly triple. While the cobalt supply was disrupted and the price shot up, nickel and other substitutes were pressed into service.

Following this, the idea of a "Resource War" by the Soviets became popular. Rather than the chaos that resulted from the Zairean cobalt situation, this would be planned, a strategy designed to destroy economic activity outside the Soviet bloc by the acquisition of vital resources by noneconomic means (military?) outside the Soviet bloc (Third World?), then withholding these minerals from the West.

An important way of getting around a cobalt situation or a "Resource War" situation is to use substitutes for a material in its end-uses. Some criteria for a satisfactory substitute are (1) ready availability domestically in adequate quantities or availability from contiguous nations, or possibly from overseas allies, (2) possessing physical and chemical properties, performance, and longevity comparable to the material of first choice, (3) well-established and known behavior and properties particularly as a component in exotic alloys, and (4) an ability for processing and fabrication with minimal changes in existing technology, capital plant, and processing and fabricating facilities. Some suggested substitutions were alunite for bauxite to make alumina, molybdenum and/or nickel for cobalt, and aluminum alloy automobile radiators for copper alloy automobile radiators. Materials can be eliminated without material substitutes, for example by using discharges of high tension electricity to shape hard objects that were formerly shaped by mineral abrasives, giving superior performance at lower cost, or by using computers/satellites to replace copper wire (land lines).

An important way of replacing a resource is by synthesis, for example, industrial diamonds and many kinds of graphite, although a certain kind of graphite could be almost replaced by a recycled product. Most graphite is synthetic, for example, graphite electrodes, graphite fiber, graphite shapes (machined or unmachined), and graphite powder.

Another way of replacing or extending a resource is by recycling the material desired from scrap or waste. This depends on whether or not the material is dissipated or is available as a no longer usable durable product. Reclamation of the durable product depends on its resistance to chemical and physical breakdown, quantities available, price of availability, and the ease of extraction from the original product. For example, bismuth in stomach medicine is hopelessly scattered (dissipated) and therefore impossible to recover, while bismuth alloys can be easily recovered and recycled. A good example where recycling makes a big difference is the resource availability situation for graphite, where flake graphite can be recovered from a renewable resource called kish, a steelmaking waste created when carbon separates out as graphite within the kish from the molten metal along with slag. After it is cold, the kish can be processed.

Several other kinds of resources need to be introduced. If strategic and critical materials are the worst case for resources, unless mitigated by substitution and/or recycling, one of the best is an abundant resource. An abundant resource is one whose material has so far found little use, such as using high-aluminous clays or anorthosite to produce alumina, and magnesium before it was recovered from seawater. An abundant resource is quite similar to a perpetual resource. The reserve base is the part of an identified resource that has a reasonable potential for becoming economically available at a time beyond when currently proven technology and current economics are in operation. Identified resources are those whose location, grade, quality, and quantity are known or estimated from specific geologic evidence. Reserves are that part of the reserve base that can be economically extracted at the time of determination; reserves should not be used as a surrogate for resources because they are often distorted by taxation or the owning firm's public relations needs.

=== Comprehensive natural resource models ===
Harrison Brown and associates stated that humanity will process lower and lower grade "ore". Iron will come from low-grade iron-bearing material such as raw rock from anywhere in an iron formation, not much different from the input used to make taconite pellets in North America and elsewhere today. As coking coal reserves decline, pig iron and steel production will use non-coke-using processes (i.e. electric steel). The aluminum industry could shift from using bauxite to using anorthosite and clay. Magnesium metal and magnesia consumption (i.e. in refractories), currently obtained from seawater, will increase. Sulfur will be obtained from pyrites, then gypsum or anhydrite. Metals such as copper, zinc, nickel, and lead will be obtained from manganese nodules or the Phosphoria formation (sic!). These changes could occur irregularly in different parts of the world. While Europe and North America might use anorthosite or clay as raw material for aluminum, other parts of the world might use bauxite, and while North America might use taconite, Brazil might use iron ore. New materials will appear (note: they have), the result of technological advances, some acting as substitutes and some with new properties. Recycling will become more common and more efficient (note: it has!). Ultimately, minerals and metals will be obtained by processing "average" rock. Rock, 100 tonnes of "average" igneous rock, will yield eight tonnes of aluminum, five tonnes of iron, and 0.6 tonnes of titanium.

The USGS model based on crustal abundance data and the reserve-abundance relationship of McKelvey, is applied to several metals in the Earth's crust (worldwide) and in the U.S. crust. The potential currently recoverable (present technology, economy) resources that come closest to the McKelvey relationship are those that have been sought for the longest time, such as copper, zinc, lead, silver, gold and molybdenum. Metals that do not follow the McKelvey relationship are ones that are byproducts (of major metals) or have not been vital to the economy until recently (titanium, aluminum to a lesser degree). Bismuth is an example of a byproduct metal that does not follow the relationship very well; the 3% lead reserves in the western U.S. would have only 100 ppm bismuth, clearly too low-grade for a bismuth reserve. The world recoverable resource potential is 2,120 million tonnes for copper, 2,590 million tonnes for nickel, 3,400 million tonnes for zinc, 3,519 billion tonnes for aluminum, and 2,035 billion tonnes for iron.

Diverse authors have further contributions. Some think the number of substitutes is almost infinite, particularly with the flow of new materials from the chemical industry; identical end products can be made from different materials and starting points. Since all materials are 100 times weaker than they theoretically should be, it ought to be possible to eliminate areas of dislocations and greatly strengthen them, enabling lesser quantities to be used. To summarize, "mining" companies will have more and more diverse products, the world economy is moving away from materials towards services, and the population seems to be levelling, all of which implies a lessening of demand growth for materials; much of the materials will be recovered from somewhat uncommon rocks, there will be much more coproducts and byproducts from a given operation, and more trade in minerals and materials.

=== Trend towards perpetual resources ===
As radical new technology impacts the materials and minerals world more and more powerfully, the materials used are more and more likely to have perpetual resources. There are already more and more materials that have perpetual resources and less and less materials that have nonrenewable resources or are strategic and critical materials. Some materials that have perpetual resources such as salt, stone, magnesium, and common clay were mentioned previously. Thanks to new technology, synthetic diamonds were added to the list of perpetual resources, since they can be easily made from a lump of another form of carbon. Synthetic graphite, is made in large quantities (graphite electrodes, graphite fiber) from carbon precursors such as petroleum coke or a textile fiber. A firm named Liquidmetal Technologies, Inc. is utilizing the removal of dislocations in a material with a technique that overcomes performance limitations caused by inherent weaknesses in the crystal atomic structure. It makes amorphous metal alloys, which retain a random atomic structure when the hot metal solidifies, rather than the crystalline atomic structure (with dislocations) that normally forms when hot metal solidifies. These amorphous alloys have much better performance properties than usual; for example, their zirconium-titanium Liquidmetal alloys are 250% stronger than a standard titanium alloy. The Liquidmetal alloys can supplant many high performance alloys.

Exploration of the ocean bottom in the last fifty years revealed manganese nodules and phosphate nodules in many locations. More recently, polymetallic sulfide deposits have been discovered and polymetallic sulfide "black muds" are being presently deposited from "black smokers" The cobalt scarcity situation of 1978 has a new option now: recover it from manganese nodules. A Korean firm plans to start developing a manganese nodule recovery operation in 2010; the manganese nodules recovered would average 27% to 30% manganese, 1.25% to 1.5% nickel, 1% to 1.4% copper, and 0.2% to 0.25% cobalt (commercial grade) Nautilus Minerals Ltd. is planning to recover commercial grade material averaging 29.9% zinc, 2.3% lead, and 0.5% copper from massive ocean-bottom polymetallic sulfide deposits using an underwater vacuum cleaner-like device that combines some current technologies in a new way. Partnering with Nautilus are Tech Cominco Ltd. and Anglo-American Ltd., world-leading international firms.

There are also other robot mining techniques that could be applied under the ocean. Rio Tinto is using satellite links to allow workers 1500 kilometers away to operate drilling rigs, load cargo, dig out ore and dump it on conveyor belts, and place explosives to subsequently blast rock and earth. The firm can keep workers out of danger this way, and also use fewer workers. Such technology reduces costs and offsets declines in metal content of ore reserves. Thus a variety of minerals and metals are obtainable from unconventional sources with resources available in huge quantities.

Finally, what is a perpetual resource? The ASTM definition for a perpetual resource is "one that is virtually inexhaustible on a human time-scale". Examples given include solar energy, tidal energy, and wind energy, to which should be added salt, stone, magnesium, diamonds, and other materials mentioned above. A study on the biogeophysical aspects of sustainability came up with a rule of prudent practice that a resource stock should last 700 years to achieve sustainability or become a perpetual resource, or for a worse case, 350 years.

If a resource lasting 700 or more years is perpetual, one that lasts 350 to 700 years can be called an abundant resource, and is so defined here. How long the material can be recovered from its resource depends on human need and changes in technology from extraction through the life cycle of the product to final disposal, plus recyclability of the material and availability of satisfactory substitutes. Specifically, this shows that exhaustibility does not occur until these factors weaken and play out: the availability of substitutes, the extent of recycling and its feasibility, more efficient manufacturing of the final consumer product, more durable and longer-lasting consumer products, and even a number of other factors.

The most recent resource information and guidance on the kinds of resources that must be considered is covered on the Resource Guide-Update

=== Transitioning: perpetual resources to paleoresources ===
Perpetual resources can transition to being a paleoresource. A paleoresource is one that has little or no demand for the material extracted from it; an obsolescent material, humans no longer need it. The classic paleoresource is an arrowhead-grade flint resource; no one makes flint arrowheads or spearheads anymore—making a sharpened piece of scrap steel and using it is much simpler. Obsolescent products include tin cans, tin foil, the schoolhouse slate blackboard, and radium in medical technology. Radium has been replaced by much cheaper cobalt-60 and other radioisotopes in radiation treatment. Noncorroding lead as a cable covering has been replaced by plastics.

Pennsylvania anthracite is another material where the trend towards obsolescence and becoming a paleoresource can be shown statistically. Production of anthracite was 70.4 million tonnes in 1905, 49.8 million tonnes in 1945, 13.5 million tonnes in 1965, 4.3 million tonnes in 1985, and 1.5 million tonnes in 2005. The amount used per person was 84 kg per person in 1905, 7.1 kg in 1965, and 0.8 kg in 2005. Compare this to the USGS anthracite reserves of 18.6 billion tonnes and total resources of 79 billion tonnes; the anthracite demand has dropped so much that these resources are more than perpetual.

Since anthracite resources are so far into the perpetual resource range and demand for anthracite has dropped so far, is it possible to see how anthracite might become a paleoresource? Probably by customers continuing to disappear (i.e. convert to other kinds of energy for space heating), the supply network atrophy as anthracite coal dealers cannot retain enough business to cover costs and close, and mines with too small a volume to cover costs also close. This is a mutually reinforcing process: customers convert to other forms of cleaner energy that produce less pollution and carbon dioxide, then the coal dealer has to close because of lack of enough sales volume to cover costs. The coal dealer's other customers are then forced to convert unless they can find another nearby coal dealer. Finally, the anthracite mine closes because it does not have enough sales volume to cover its costs.

== Global geochemical cycles ==
Global geochemical cycles critical for life

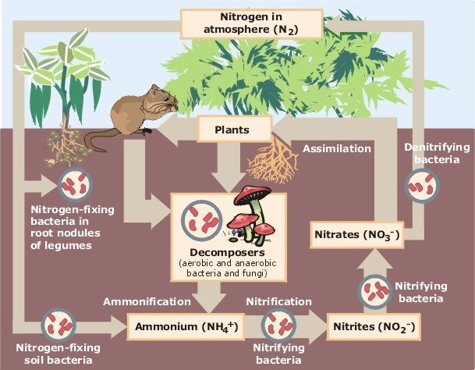
Nitrogen Cycle

Water Cycle

Carbon Cycle

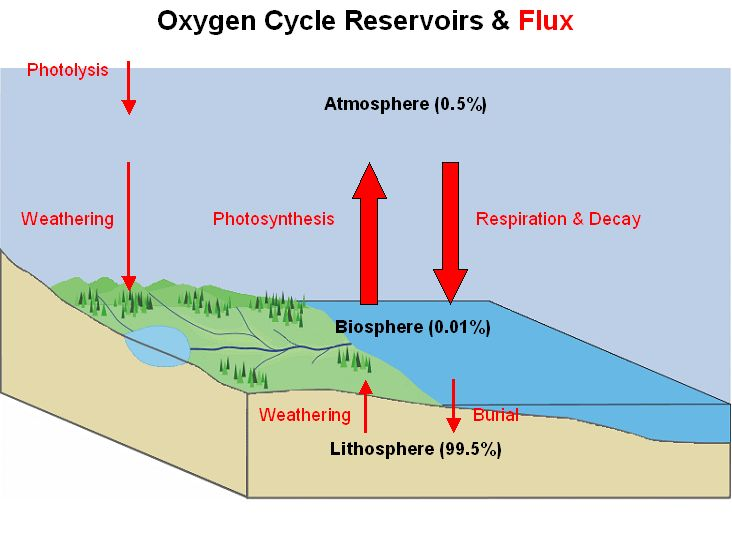
Oxygen Cycle

== See also ==
- Bioeconomics
- C. Arden Pope
- Calculation in kind
- Earth Economics (policy think tank)
- Ecodynamics
- Ecological economics
- Economic rent
- Energy accounting
- Energy Economics
- Energy and Environment
- Environmental economics
- Industrial ecology
- Jevons's paradox
- Land (economics)
- Land value tax
- Low-carbon economy
- Peak oil
  - Hubbert's peak
- Population dynamics
- Severance tax
- Social metabolism
- Sustainable development
- Systems ecology
- Thermoeconomics
- Tragedy of the anticommons
- Tragedy of the commons
- World3
