= Hotelling's lemma =

Result in microeconomics

Hotelling's lemma is a result in microeconomics that relates the supply of a good to the maximum profit of the producer. It was first shown by Harold Hotelling, and is widely used in the theory of the firm.

Specifically, it states: The rate of an increase in maximized profits with respect to a price increase is equal to the net supply of the good. In other words, if the firm makes its choices to maximize profits, then the choices can be recovered from the knowledge of the maximum profit function.

== Formal statement ==
Let $p$ denote a variable price, and $w$ be a constant cost of each input. Let $x:{\mathbb R^+}\rightarrow X$ be a mapping from the price to a set of feasible input choices $X\subset {\mathbb R^+}$. Let $f:{\mathbb R^+}\rightarrow {\mathbb R^+}$ be the production function, and $y(p)\triangleq f(x(p))$ be the net supply.

The maximum profit can be written by

$$\pi (p) = \max_{x} p\cdot y(p) - w \cdot x(p).$$

Then the lemma states that if the profit $\pi$ is differentiable at $p$, the maximizing net supply is given by

$$y^*(p) = \frac {d\pi (p)}{d p}.$$

== Proof for Hotelling's lemma ==
The lemma is a corollary of the envelope theorem.

Specifically, the maximum profit can be rewritten as $\pi (p, x^*) = p\cdot f(x^*(p)) - w \cdot x^*(p)$ where $x^*$ is the maximizing input corresponding to $y^*$. Due to the optimality, the first order condition gives

$\frac{\partial \pi}{\partial x} \bigg|_{x=x^*} = 0.$	1

By taking the derivative by $p$ at $x^*$,

$$\frac{d\pi}{d p} = \frac{\partial \pi}{\partial x}\bigg|_{x=x^*} \frac{\partial x}{\partial p} + \frac{\partial \pi}{\partial p} = \frac{\partial \pi}{\partial p} = f(x^*(p)) = y^*(p)$$

where the second equality is due to (1). QED

== Application of Hotelling's lemma ==
Consider the following example. Let output $y$ have price $p$ and inputs $x_1$ and $x_2$ have prices $w_1$ and $w_2$. Suppose the production function is $y = x_1^{1/3}x_2^{1/3}$. The unmaximized profit function is $\pi(p, w_1, w_2, x_1, x_2) = p y - w_1x_1 - w_2x_2$. From this can be derived the profit-maximizing choices of inputs and the maximized profit function, a function just of the input and output prices, which is

$\pi(p, w_1, w_2 ) = \frac{1}{27} \frac{p^3}{w_1w_2}$

Hotelling's Lemma says that from the maximized profit function we can find the profit-maximizing choices of output and input by taking partial derivatives:

$\frac{ \partial \pi(p, w_1, w_2 )}{\partial p} = y = \frac{1}{9} \frac{p^2}{w_1w_2}$

$\frac{ \partial \pi(p, w_1, w_2 )}{\partial w_1} = -x_1 = -\frac{1}{27} \frac{ p^3}{w_1^2w_2}$

$\frac{ \partial \pi(p, w_1, w_2 )}{\partial w_2} = -x_2 = - \frac{1}{27} \frac{ p^3}{w_1w_2^2}$

Note that Hotelling's lemma gives the net supplies, which are positive for outputs and negative for inputs, since profit rises with output prices and falls with input prices.

== Criticisms and empirical evidence ==
A number of criticisms have been made with regards to the use and application of Hotelling's lemma in empirical work.

C. Robert Taylor points out that the accuracy of Hotelling's lemma is dependent on the firm maximizing profits, meaning that it is producing profit maximizing output $y^*$ and cost minimizing input $x^*$. If a firm is not producing at these optima, then Hotelling's lemma would not hold.

== See also ==
- Hotelling's law
- Hotelling's rule
- Supply and demand
- Shephard's lemma
