= SmithKline Corp. v. Eli Lilly & Co. =

1978 U.S. federal appeals court decision on bundling

- Court: United States Court of Appeals for the Third Circuit
- Full case name: SmithKline Corporation v. Eli Lilly & Company
- Argued: February 21, 1978
- Decided: April 3, 1978
- Citation: 575 F.2d 1056

Case history
- Prior history: 427 F. Supp. 1089 (E.D. Pa. 1976)

Court membership
- Judges sitting: Ruggero J. Aldisert, Francis Lund Van Dusen, Joseph F. Weis Jr.

Case opinions
- Majority: Aldisert, joined by a unanimous panel

Laws applied
- Sherman Antitrust Act

Keywords
- Bundling

SmithKline Corp. v. Eli Lilly and Co., 575 F.2d 1056 (3d Cir. 1978), is a 1978 decision of the United States Court of Appeals for the Third Circuit that first considered the price-discounting practice now termed bundling. Bundling is the setting of the total price of a purchase of several products or services from one seller at a lower level than the sum of the prices of the products or services purchased separately from several sellers. Typically, one of the bundled items (the "primary product") is available only from the seller engaging in the bundling, while the other item or items (the "secondary product") can be obtained from several sellers. The effect of the practice is to divert purchasers who need the primary product to the bundling seller and away from other sellers of only the secondary product. For that reason, the practice may be held an antitrust violation as it was in the SmithKline v. Lilly case, in which the Third Circuit held that Lilly engaged in monopolization in violation of Sherman Act § 2.

== Background ==
SmithKline Corp. (SKC) and Eli Lilly and Co. (Lilly) were manufacturers of prescription drugs, including antibiotics. In 1964 Lilly introduced the first cephalosporin antibiotic, Keflin (cephalothin), into the United States market. It subsequently introduced four additional cephalosporin drugs: in 1972 Keflex (cephalexin), in 1967 Loridine (cephaloridine), in 1971 Kafocin (cephaloglycin), and in 1973 Kefzol (cefazolin). Lilly had patents on all its cephalosporin antibiotics except Kefzol (cefazolin), which this case concerns. From 1964 to 1972, Lilly's patents gave it a monopoly over all the cephalosporin drugs then in use. In 1973, competitors began to introduce new cephalosporins. The first was SKC's Ancef (cefazolin); Lilly then introduced Kefzol, its identical form of cefazolin.

Before 1973 Lilly adopted a marketing program known as the Cephalosporin Savings Plan (CSP), designed to make its cephalosporins more competitive with other antibiotics. The CSP provided that a rebate in the form of Lilly merchandise would be paid to hospitals based on the total amount of Lilly cephalosporins that they purchased. This suit concerned the 1975 version of the CSP, which Lilly adopted in response to competition. Under the 1975 CSP, Lilly gave hospitals an additional 3% rebate based on the purchases of specified minimum quantities of any three of Lilly's five cephalosporins. SKC sold only two cephalosporins—Ancef and Anspor (cephradine). Lilly dominated the cephalosporin market with its sales of Keflin and Keflex, but its Kefzol and SKC's Ancef were in direct competition with comparable sales. Kefzol and Ancef are nearly therapeutically equivalent to Keflin but they command lower market prices because Lilly has a patent monopoly on Keflin; by the same token, profits on Keflin are far higher than on Kefzol. The sales of Kefzol and Ancef were growing at the expense of Keflin sales.

The 1974 revised CSP in practical effect combined hospital purchases of Keflex and Keflin with those of Kefzol. In 1974 the two market leaders, Keflex and Keflin, accounted for 75% of all hospital cephalosporin purchases; Kefzol/Ancef was a small fraction of that. Hospitals were free to purchase SmithKline's Ancef with their Keflin and Keflex orders with Lilly, so no tie-in was compelled, but if they did so they risked loss of the 3% rebate on all cephalosporin purchases from Lilly, where 75% of the total was Keflex and Keflin. This calculated out, the court said, to make SKC give a 16% to 30% discount on Ancef sales to meet Lilly's 3% on Keflex and Keflin on an equal net dollar basis.

SKC sued Lilly for various antitrust violations, seeking damages and an injunction. The district court found that Lilly monopolized the cephalosporin market. The district court concluded:

Lilly, by linking its most powerful cephalosporin products, Keflin and Keflex, to its unpatented product, Kefzol, has unlawfully used its monopoly power to foreclose competition in and to exclude competition from the cephalosporin market. In so doing, Lilly has engaged in the willful maintenance of monopoly power in violation of section two of the Sherman Act.

The district court enjoined Lilly "from offering any rebate or sales promotion plan except on a product by product basis."

== Ruling of Third Circuit ==
The Third Circuit held that Lilly had engaged in the "willful acquisition and maintenance of monopoly power." Lilly:

brought [this] about by linking products on which Lilly faced no competition—Keflin and Keflex—with a competitive product, Kefzol. The result was to sell all three products on a non-competitive basis in what would have otherwise been a competitive market for Ancef and Kefzol. The effect of the Revised CSP was to force SmithKline to pay rebates on one product, Ancef, equal to rebates paid by Lilly based on volume sales of three products.

The court recognized that Lilly began with a lawful patent monopoly on its patented drugs. But "that status changed when it instituted its Revised CSP." But for "Lilly's Revised CSP, the price, supply, and demand of Kefzol and Ancef would have been determined by the economic laws of a competitive market." Instead, Lilly used the revised CSP "blatantly to revise...those economic laws" and that "made Lilly a transgressor under § 2 of the Sherman Act." The Third Circuit therefore affirmed the judgment of the district court.

== Commentary ==
● Barry Nalebuff, in a 2005 article in the Antitrust Bulletin, explains the dollars and cents of Lilly's use of bundling to protect its Keflin monopoly. Its Kefzol and SK's Ancef—identical to one another—were cheaper, partial substitutes for patented Keflin, which had a higher sales price and generated more profit but was cheaper to manufacture than the other two. Keflin accounted for most of Lilly's cephalosporin sales. Kefzol/Ancef, however, was cutting into Keflin sales as hospitals partially substituted cheaper, and in some ways better, Kefzol/Ancef for Keflin. Nalebuff explains:

Thus it was especially important for Lilly to prevent competition between SmithKline's Ancef and Lilly's Kefzol from damaging the golden goose of Keflin. This helps explain why Lilly didn't just lower the price of Kefzol by 20%. While that would have been equally effective at keeping SmithKline out of the market, it would have led to more substitution of Kefzol for Keflin.

The bundling program "was effective at keeping SmithKline out of the market while also preserving Keflin's monopoly," because:

The 3% rebate on Keflin and Keflex contributed 17% of the 20% effective rebate on Kefzol. But that rebate came as a lump-sum amount. If the hospital were to expand its use of Kefzol, it would get only a 3% savings. If the hospital were to replace $100 of Keflin with $50 of Kefzol, it would lose a 3% rebate on $50. Thus, under the Revised CSP, there was a reduced incentive to substitute Kefzol for Keflin.

== See also ==
- Bundling (antitrust law)
- Raising rivals' costs
- LePage's, Inc. v. 3M
