= Location model (economics) =

Competition model in economics

In economics, a location model or spatial model is any monopolistic competition model that demonstrates consumer preference for particular brands of goods and their locations. Examples of location models include Hotelling's Location Model, Salop's Circle Model, and hybrid variations.

== Traditional vs. location models ==
In traditional economic models, consumers display preference given the constraints of a product characteristic space. Consumers perceive certain brands with common characteristics to be close substitutes, and differentiate these products from their unique characteristics. For example, there are many brands of chocolate with nuts and others without them. Hence, the chocolate with nuts is a constraint of its product characteristic space.

On the other hand, consumers in location models display preference for both the utility gained from a particular brand's characteristics as well as its geographic location; these two factors form an enhanced “product characteristic space.” Consumers are now willing to sacrifice pleasure from products for a closer geographic location, and vice versa. For example, consumers realize high costs for products that are located far from their spatial point (e.g. transportation costs, time, etc.) and also for products that deviate from their ideal features. Firms have greater market power when they satisfy the consumer's demand for products at closer distance or preferred products.

== Hotelling's location model ==
In 1929, Hotelling developed a location model that demonstrates the relationship between location and pricing behavior of firms. He represented this notion through a line of fixed length. Assuming all consumers are identical (except for location) and consumers are evenly dispersed along the line, both the firms and consumer respond to changes in demand and the economic environment.

In Hotelling's Location Model, firms do not exercise variations in product characteristics; firms compete and price their products in only one dimension, geographic location. Therefore, traditional usage of this model should be used for consumers who perceive products to be perfect substitutes or as a foundation for modern location models.

=== An example of fixed firms ===
==== Assumptions ====
Assume that the line in Hotelling's location model is actually a street with fixed length.

All consumers are identical, except they are uniformly located at two equal quadrants $a \,$ and $b \,$, which is divided in the center by point $o \,$. Consumers face a transportation/time cost for reaching a firm, denoted by $c \,$; they have no preferences for the firms.

There are two firms in this scenario, Firm x and Firm y; each one is located at a different end of the street, is fixed in location and sells an identical product.

==== Advanced analysis ====
Given the assumptions of the Hotelling model, consumers will choose either firm as long as the combined price $P \,$ and transportation cost $c \,$ of the product is less than the competitive firm.

For example, if both firms sell the product at the same price $P \,$, consumers in quadrants $a \,$ and $b \,$ will pick the firm closest to them. The price realized by the consumer is

$P+c=P_1 \,$, where $P_1 \,$ is the price of the product including the cost of transportation.

As long as $c \,$ for Firm x is greater than Firm y, consumers will travel to Firm y to purchase their product; this minimizes $P_1 \,$. Only the consumers who live at point $o \,$, the halfway point between the two firms, will be indifferent between the two product locations.

=== An example of firm relocation ===
==== Assumptions ====
Assume that the line in Hotelling's location model is actually a street with fixed length.

All consumers are identical, except they are uniformly located in four quadrants $a \,$, $b \,$, $c \,$, and $d \,$; the halfway point between the endpoints is point $o \,$. Consumers face an equal transportation/time cost for reaching a firm, denoted by $c \,$; they have no preferences for the firms.

There are two firms in this scenario, Firm x and Firm y; each one is located at a different end of the street, is able to relocate at no cost, and sells an identical product.

==== Analysis ====
Two food carts on a beach, where each person on the beach buys from the closest cart. Under Hotelling's law, cart A can attract more customers by moving to the right, and cart B by moving to the left.

In this example, Firm A and Firm B will maximize their profit by increasing their consumer pool. Firm A will move slightly toward Firm B, in order to gain Firm B's customers. In response, Firm B will move slightly toward Firm A to re-establish its loss, and increase the pool from its competitor. The cycle repeats until both firms are at point $o \,$, the halfway point of the street where each firm has the same number of customers. This result is known as Hotelling's law.

Hotelling's law was invalidated in 1979 by d'Aspremont, J. Jaskold Gabszewicz and J.-F. Thisse. Consider that quick (short run) price adjustment and slow (long run) location adjustment is modelled as a repeated two-stage game, where in the first stage firms will make an incremental relocation and in the second period, having observed each other's new locations, they will simultaneously choose prices. d'Aspremont et al. (1979) prove that when firms are sufficiently close together (but not located in the same place) no Nash equilibrium price pair (in pure strategies) exists for the second stage subgame (because there is an incentive to undercut the rival firm's price and gain the entire market). For example, when firms are equidistant from the centre of the street, no equilibrium price pair exists for locations 1/4 or closer than 1/4 of the length of the street from the centre. The non-existence of a Cournot equilibrium precludes the ending of the game, and so it is not repeated. Thus, although both firms at the halfway point itself is an equilibrium, there is no tendency for firms to agglomerate here.

If only Firm A can relocate without costs and Firm B is fixed, Firm A will move to the side of Firm B where the consumer pool is maximized. Consequently, the profits for Firm A significantly increase, while the profits for Firm B significantly decrease.

== Salop's circle model ==
One of the most famous variations of Hotelling's location model is Salop's circle model. Similar to the previous spatial representations, the circle model examines consumer preference with regards to geographic location. However, Salop introduces two significant factors: 1) firms are located around a circle with no end-points, and 2) it allows the consumer to choose a second, heterogeneous good.

=== An example of a second good ===
==== Assumptions ====
Assume that the consumers are equidistant from one another around the circle. The model will occur for one time period, in which only one product is purchased. The consumer will have a choice of purchasing variations of Product A (a differentiated product) or Product B (an outside good; undifferentiated product).

There are two firms also located equidistant around the circle. Each firm offers a variation of Product A, and an outside firm offers a good, Product B.

==== Analysis ====
In this example, the consumer wants to purchase their ideal variation of Product A. They are willing to purchase the product, given that it is within the constraint of their utility, transportation/distance costs, and price.

The utility $u \,$ for a particular product at distance $d \,$ is represented in the following equation:

$$U(d,d_1) = u - r|d-d_1| \,$$

Where $u \,$ is the utility from a superior brand, $r \,$ denotes the rate at which an inferior brand lowers the utility from the superior brand, $d \,$ is the location of the superior brand, and $d_1 \,$ is the location of the consumer. The distance between the brand and the consumer is thereby given in $|d-d_1| \,$.

The consumer's primary goal is to maximize consumer surplus, i.e. purchase the product that best satisfies any combination of price and quality. Although the consumer may receive more pleasure from their superior brand, the inferior brand may maximize the surplus $CS \,$ which is given by:

$U(d,d_1) - P = CS \,$, where the difference is between the utility of a product at location $d \,$ and the price $P \,$.

Now suppose the consumer also has the option to purchase an outside, undifferentiated Product B. The consumer surplus gained from Product B is denoted by $u^* \,$.

Therefore, for a given amount of money, the consumer will purchase the superior variation of Product A over Product B as long as

$U(d,d_1) - P \ge u^* \,$, where the consumer surplus from the superior variation of Product A is greater than the consumer surplus gained from Product B.

Alternatively, the consumer only purchases the superior variation of product A as long as

$u - u^* - r|d-d_1| - P \ge 0 \,$, where the difference between the surplus of the superior variation of Product A and the surplus gained from Product B is positive.

== See also ==
- Economics
- Economic geography
- Location theory
- Microeconomics
- Industrial organization
- Retail geography
- Hotelling's location model
