= Raising rivals' costs =

Raising rivals' costs is a concept or theory in United States antitrust law describing a tactic or device to gain market share or exclude competitors. The origin of the concept has been attributed to Professors Aaron Director and Edward H. Levi of the University of Chicago Law School, who wrote briefly in 1956 that a firm with monopoly power can decide to impose additional costs on others in an industry for exclusionary purposes. They stated that such a tactic "might be valuable if the effect of it would be to impose greater costs on possible competitors."

For example, a capital-intensive firm might agree with a union to impose higher wages in the industry, to the disadvantage of labor-intensive rivals. The concept of raising rivals' costs was developed more thoroughly in the 1980s in a series of articles by Jaunusz A. Ordover, Garth Saloner, Steven C. Salop, David T. Scheffman

The concept of raising rivals' costs has been the basis for finding an antitrust violation in such rebate-bundling cases as LePage's, Inc. v. 3M and SmithKline Corp. v. Eli Lilly & Co. In those cases, the defendants adopted rebate systems over their broad range of products such that, to match the net dollar value of the rebates to purchasers, the plaintiffs' competitors with narrower product ranges had either to provide a much greater unit rebate on their sales or else exit the business.

== Historical development ==
In two articles in the mid-1980s, Steven Salop and David Scheffman argued that a dominant firm could profit from raising rivals' variable costs if the increase in costs led to a sufficient increase in the dominant firm's demand that exceeded the shift in its average cost curve. They contended that raising rivals' costs are more advantageous competitively than predatory price cutting, particularly when the firm's "direct costs of a cost-raising strategy may be far lower than the costs inflicted on the rivals." More recently, Scheffman explained that it will be profitable to raise rivals' costs if "the dominant firm can raise the market price at the current level of output by more than the firm raises its average cost (keeping output constant)."

Since then, a considerable body of economic literature and some caselaw accumulated. But it was inconclusive. Scheffman concludes:

The important lesson that was largely ignored, at least in the ensuing economics literature, was that lawyers and the judicial system could not be convinced that economics could suitably draw the line determining when a firm with market power was doing "too much" of what are otherwise normal competitive strategies and tactics, particularly with respect to product innovation and introduction, expansion, and pricing. The subsequent literature has not contributed much to drawing that line credibly.

== Cases involving raising rivals' costs ==
=== Pennington ===
In United Mine Workers v. Pennington, a group of large coal companies conspired with a union to eliminate smaller coal companies by agreeing to impose higher wage rates and welfare fund payments in the industry, which the smaller companies could not afford. The Court ruled:

[A] union forfeits its exemption from the antitrust laws when it is clearly shown that it has agreed with one set of employers to impose a certain wage scale on other bargaining units. One group of employers may not conspire to eliminate competitors from the industry and the union is liable with the employers if it becomes a party to the conspiracy. This is true even though the union's part in the scheme is an undertaking to secure the same wages, hours or other conditions of employment from the remaining employers in the industry.

=== LePage's and SmithKline ===
In both LePage's, Inc. v. 3M and SmithKline Corp. v. Eli Lilly & Co. the defendant established a cumulative price discount (rebate) that applied over multiple products, while the plaintiff, which sold only one or two products in the same field, could not match the value of the defendants' discounts. For example, suppose the defendant sells five products, for each of which a customer annually needs 1000 units at $100 each, and the plaintiff offers a 3% rebate; over a year that is 5 x 10,000 x $100 x .03 = $150,000. To match that, the plaintiff would have to offer a 15% rebate on its one product (assuming same volume and price). The practice was held monopolistic.

=== JTC Petroleum ===
In JTC Petroleum Co. v. Piasa Motor Fuels, Inc., a group of construction firms that applied asphalt emulsion to the surfaces of public roads (the "applicators") agreed among themselves to divide markets and rig bids on jobs for local governments. JTC, the plaintiff in this case, attempted to enter the business in competition against the applicators and to bid against them for local government emulsion application contracts. The applicator group then persuaded the asphalt emulsion producers in the area not to sell emulsion to JTC, so that it was unable to compete against the applicators instigating the boycott. The producers had also formed a cartel to maintain prices.

Thus, to prevail, JTC had to show that the applicators enlisted the local producers in their conspiracy, assigning them the role of policing the applicators' cartel by refusing to sell to applicators who defied the cartel—such as JTC, which had tried to bid for jobs that the cartel had assigned to other applicators. JTC claims that the applicators got the local producers to refuse to sell emulsion to it, so that the cost to JTC of obtaining emulsion was prohibitive: "The producer was the cat's paw; the applicators were the cat." Apparently, the cartel compensated the producers to do this. Therefore, "a rational jury could conclude that JTC was indeed the victim of a producers' boycott organized by the applicator defendants." The district court was wrong to grant summary judgment against JTC on its Sherman Act § 1 claim.

=== Conwood ===
In Conwood Co., L.P. v. United States Tobacco Co., USTC, a dominant manufacturer (77% market share) of "moist snuff" sought to eliminate Conwood as a competitor by tactics that raised its operating costs.

The key to distribution of moist snuff was the in-store point-of-sale displays—product racks and signs. These are essential because most forms of advertising tobacco products are now illegal, leaving point-of-sale materials as the only way to attract customers. Moist snuff is generally sold from racks that have gravity fed channels from which consumers may select a can of the product. Each channel is filled with cans of a single brand of moist snuff. In addition to dispensing cans, the racks also provide point-of-sale advertising, generally carried out by a "header card"—a cardboard sign attached to the front of the rack.

USTC personnel removed Conwood racks from retail stores without the retailers' permission. There was testimony that Conwood had to spend $100,000 a month on replacement racks. USTC also removed Conwood products and destroyed Conwood racks and header cards. It was asserted that in some cases the compensation or bonuses of USTC sales representatives depended on their destroying Conwood racks. In addition to imposing replacement costs on Conwood, USTC's tactics decreased Conwood's sales volume substantially.

The Sixth Circuit said the jury had before it evidence that "beginning in 1990 USTC began a systematic effort to exclude competition from the moist snuff market." Because of the importance of point-of-sale display, "efforts by USTC, a conceded monopolist, to exclude Conwood's racks and POS advertising from retail locations through any means other than legitimate competition could certainly support Conwood's § 2 Sherman Act claim." The court concluded:

The jury could have found, and apparently did find, that USTC's pervasive practice of destroying Conwood's racks and POS materials and reducing the number of Conwood facings through exclusive agreements with and misrepresentations to retailers was exclusionary conduct without a sufficient justification, and that USTC maintained its monopoly power by engaging in such conduct. Therefore, the district court did not err in holding that there was sufficient evidence for a jury to find willful maintenance of monopoly power.
