= History of waste management =

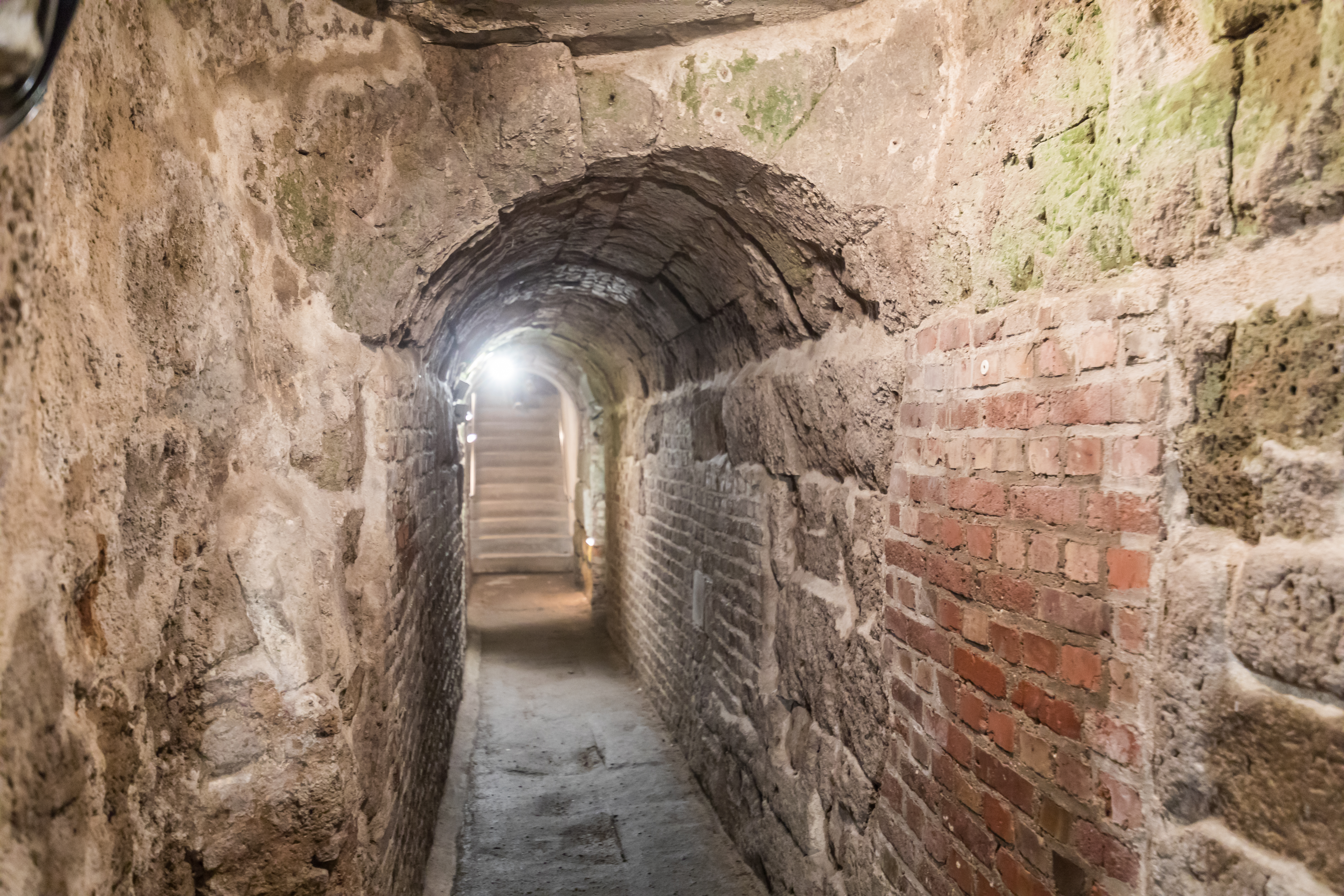
A Roman sewer tunnel in Cologne

Waste management has been a concern for human civilizations throughout history. The earliest known wastewater management system dates back to around 6500 BCE in present-day Syria, featuring sophisticated gutter systems and settling chambers. Ancient civilizations like the Roman Empire developed complex waste removal systems, including the Cloaca Maxima, which emptied into the Tiber River. The Maya of Central America had monthly rituals for burning garbage. However, access to these early waste management systems was often limited to higher socioeconomic classes.

The Industrial Revolution led to a rapid deterioration of sanitation in urban areas, particularly in England. The first organized solid waste management system appeared in London in the late 18th century with the 'dust-yards' system. In the mid-19th century, Edwin Chadwick's report on sanitary conditions spurred legislation like the Nuisance Removal and Disease Prevention Act 1846. The first incinerator was built in Nottingham in 1874, despite initial opposition. New York City became the first U.S. city with public-sector garbage management in 1895. Early garbage removal trucks were horse-drawn, later evolving into motorized vehicles with hydraulic compactors by the 1930s.

== Early history ==
Waste has always been generated by humans. In areas with low population density waste generation may have been negligible. In higher population areas even largely biodegradable waste had to be dealt with. Sometimes this was released back into the groundwater with environmental impact like Nor Loch. The Maya of Central America had a fixed monthly ritual, in which the people of the village would gather together and burn their garbage in large dumps.

The first known wastewater management system is located in present day Syria (El Kowm). Located in the Fertile Crescent, the Mesopotamian "oasis" shows evidence of wastewater management beginning around 6500 BCE. The area is about 120 km northeast of the ancient city of Palmyra. The site of El Kowm had vast urban planning centered around domestic wastewater drainage. There is a sophisticated gutter system within residences, as well as the connection of these gutter/drainage systems to larger systems within the city. The fluids were transported through these gutter systems from residences into ditches in the streets of the city. Additionally, there are other planned systems in the cities in surrounding areas, suggesting that there was diffusion of waste management techniques throughout the region. Many of these systems include settling chambers to mitigate the blockages that often occur in sewage systems. These chambers provide space for sediment deposits to build up without interfering with the flow of the sewer. In addition to these systems in Syria, there is also evidence of sophisticated waste management systems within other societies in the past.

The Ancient Roman Empire used sophisticated aqueduct and waste removal systems throughout their empire. Utilizing the Cloaca Maxima, the engineers of Ancient Rome created a vast network of sewers. The Cloaca Maxima emptied into the Tiber River, resulting in extreme pollution. This pollution led to the contamination of the drinking water used by the Romans (taken from the Tiber). The need for fresh water ultimately resulted in the development of the aqueduct technology. The broader span of aqueducts generally utilized pipes made out of lead, while the pipes within the cities themselves were often made of ceramic, wood, and leather. There were distinct differences in quality of waste management practices between the socioeconomic classes. Access to the sewer systems, as well as having plumbing and other water-based luxuries, was seen as a sign of status in Roman society. Access was only granted to those who paid for it. Additionally, archaeological sites and ancient texts show evidence of the first European waste management labor force. Duties performed by this force include collecting stored waste from houses not connected to the sewer system, and selling the waste to farmers for profit. The households utilizing these services were also required to pay. Compared to the systems utilized by the Fertile Crescent civilizations, the waste management systems of the Ancient Roman Empire were largely socially stratified, depending heavily on the socioeconomic status of the civilians. This stratification within waste management systems can also be viewed in Ancient Egypt. Another unique form of water/waste management was within the Aztec Empire.

== Modern era ==
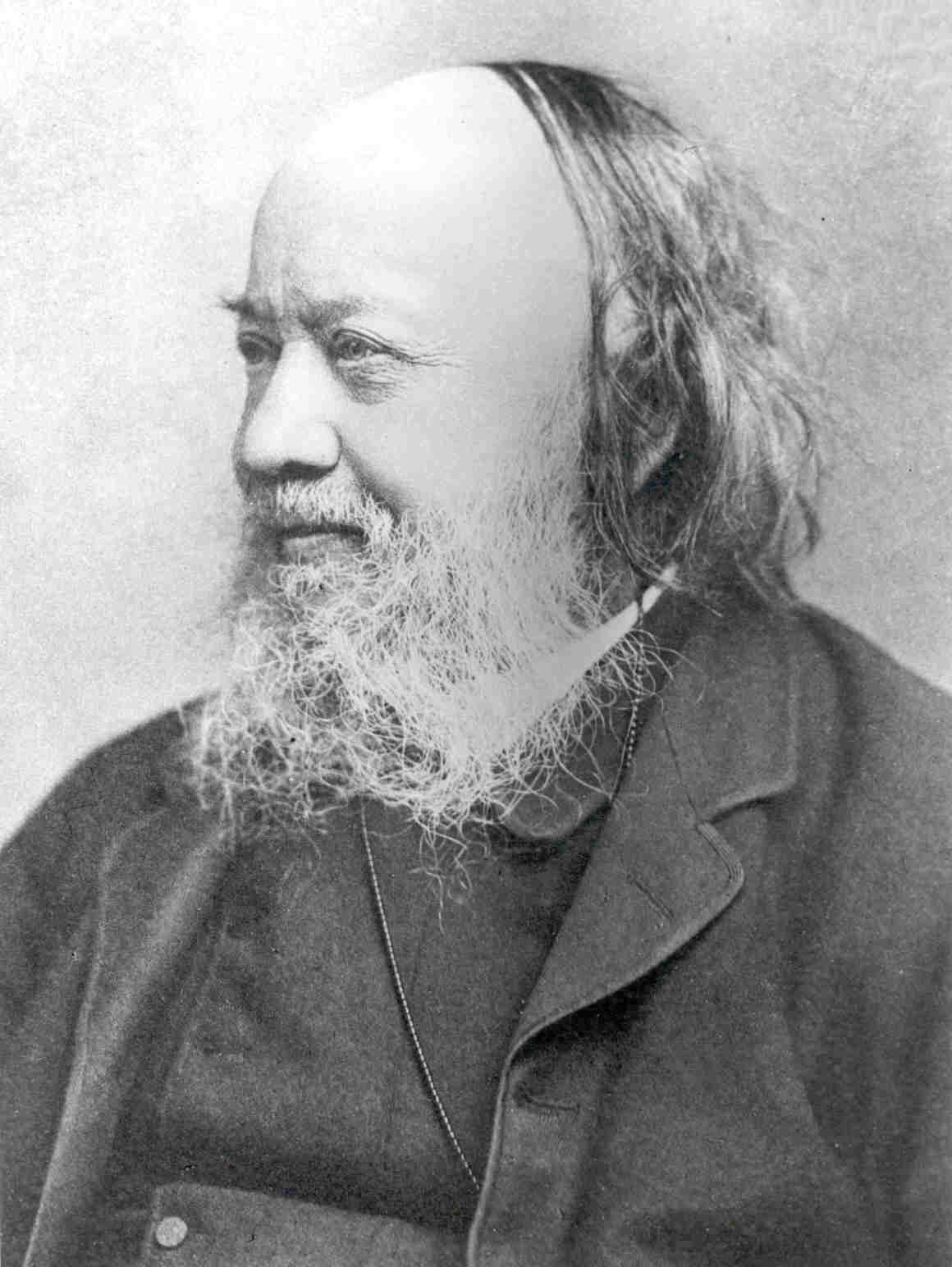
Sir Edwin Chadwick

Following the onset of industrialization and the sustained urban growth of large population centres in England, the buildup of waste in the cities caused a rapid deterioration in levels of sanitation and the general quality of urban life. The streets became choked with filth due to the lack of waste clearance regulations. Calls for the establishment of a municipal authority with waste removal powers were mooted as early as 1751 by Corbyn Morris in London, who proposed that "...as the preservation of the health of the people is of great importance, it is proposed that the cleaning of this city, should be put under one uniform public management, and all the filth be...conveyed by the Thames to proper distance in the country".

The first occurrence of organised solid waste management system appeared in London in the late 18th century. A waste collection and resource recovery system was established around the 'dust-yards'. The main constituent of municipal waste was the coal ash ('dust') which had a market value for brick-making and as a soil improver. Such profitability encouraged dust-contractors to recover effectively 100% of the residual wastes remaining after readily saleable items and materials had been removed by the informal sector in the streets ('rag-and-bone men'). Therefore, this was an early example of organised, municipal-wide solid waste management. The dust-yard system had been working successfully up to middle 1850s, when the market value of 'dust' collapsed. It was important in facilitating a relatively smooth transition to an institutionalised, municipally-run solid waste management system in England.

In the mid-19th century, spurred by increasingly devastating cholera outbreaks and the emergence of a public health debate that the first consolidated legislation on the issue emerged. Highly influential in this new focus was the report The Sanitary Condition of the Labouring Population in 1842 of the social reformer, Edwin Chadwick, in which he argued for the importance of adequate waste removal and management facilities to improve the health and wellbeing of the city's population. Chadwick's proposals were based on the miasmatic theory of disease transmission, which was proven to be false following the turn of the 1900s.

The Nuisance Removal and Disease Prevention Act 1846 began what was to be a steadily evolving process of the provision of regulated waste management in London. The Metropolitan Board of Works was the first citywide authority that centralized sanitation regulation for the rapidly expanding city and the Public Health Act 1875 made it compulsory for every household to deposit their weekly waste in 'moveable receptacles' for disposal - the first concept for a dust-bin. In the Ashanti Empire, there existed a Public Works Department that was responsible for sanitation in Kumasi and its suburbs. They kept the streets clean daily and commanded civilians to keep their compounds clean and weeded.

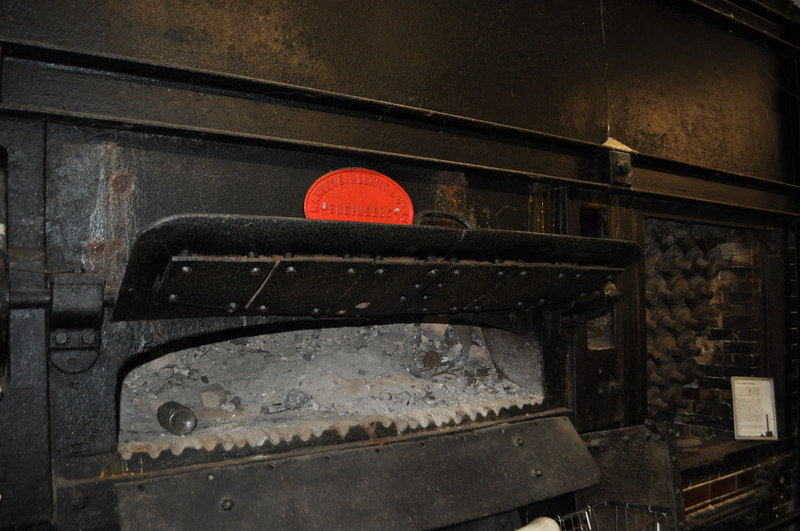
Manlove, Alliott & Co. Ltd. 1894 destructor furnace.

The dramatic increase in waste for disposal led to the creation of the first incineration plants, or, as they were then called, 'destructors'. In 1874, the first incinerator was built in Nottingham by Manlove, Alliott & Co. Ltd. to the design of Alfred Fryer. However, these were met with opposition on account of the large amounts of ash they produced and which wafted over the neighbouring areas.

Similar municipal systems of waste disposal sprung up at the turn of the 20th century in other large cities of Europe and North America. In 1895, New York City became the first U.S. city with public-sector waste management.

Early garbage removal trucks were simply open bodied dump trucks pulled by a team of horses. They became motorized in the early part of the 20th century and the first close body trucks to eliminate odours with a dumping lever mechanism were introduced in the 1920s in Britain. These were soon equipped with 'hopper mechanisms' where the scooper was loaded at floor level and then hoisted mechanically to deposit the waste in the truck. The Garwood Load Packer was the first truck in 1938, to incorporate a hydraulic compactor.

In the 19th century, in the United States, cities often became choked with horse manure. While the odor was tolerable to 19th century sensitivities, walking through the streets without boots resulted in deplorable-appearing footwear. In many cities, lacking trash collection, pigs and dogs ran loose, consuming the trash, but excreting dung, which smelled offensively. Dead animals, particularly horses, were left lying in the streets, facilitating disease.

== See also ==
- 1854 Broad Street cholera outbreak
- Eugène Poubelle
- History of water supply and sanitation
- History of environmental pollution
