= Non-renewable resource =

Class of natural resources

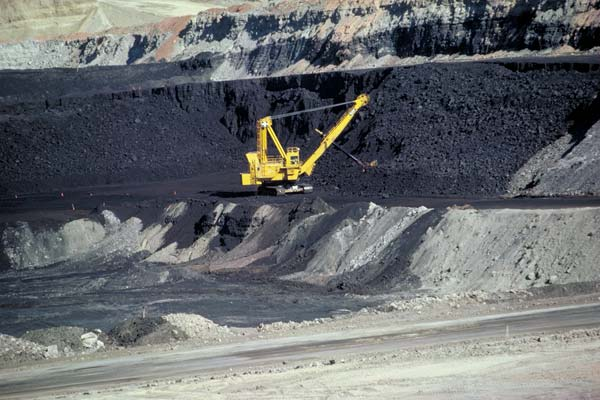
A coal mine in Wyoming, United States. Coal, produced over millions of years, is a finite and non-renewable resource on a human time scale.

A non-renewable resource (also called a finite resource) is a natural resource that cannot be readily replaced by natural means at a pace quick enough to keep up with consumption. An example is carbon-based fossil fuels. The original organic matter, with the aid of heat and pressure, becomes a fuel such as oil or gas. Earth minerals and metal ores, fossil fuels (coal, petroleum, natural gas) and groundwater in certain aquifers are all considered non-renewable resources, though individual elements are always conserved (except in nuclear reactions, nuclear decay or atmospheric escape).

Conversely, resources such as timber (when harvested sustainably) and wind (used to power energy conversion systems) are considered renewable resources, largely because their localized replenishment can also occur within our lifespans.

== Earth minerals and metal ores ==
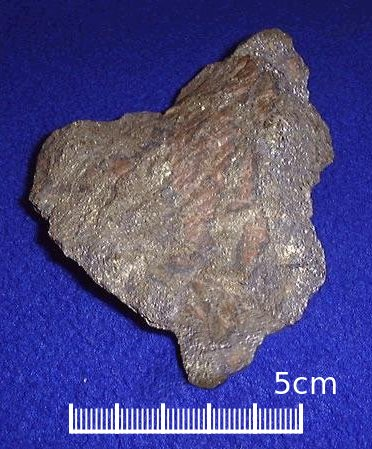
Raw gold ore that is eventually smelted down into gold metal

Earth minerals and metal ores are examples of non-renewable resources. The metals themselves are present in vast amounts in Earth's crust, and their extraction by humans only occurs where they are concentrated by natural geological processes (such as heat, pressure, organic activity, weathering and other processes) enough to become economically viable to extract. These processes generally take from tens of thousands to millions of years, through plate tectonics, tectonic subsidence and crustal recycling.

The localized deposits of metal ores near the surface which can be extracted economically by humans are non-renewable in human time-frames. There are certain rare earth minerals and elements that are more scarce and exhaustible than others. These are in high demand in manufacturing, particularly for the electronics industry.

== Fossil fuels ==
Natural resources such as coal, petroleum (crude oil) and natural gas take thousands of years to form naturally and cannot be replaced as fast as they are being consumed. It is projected that fossil-based resources will eventually become too costly to harvest and humanity will need to shift its reliance to renewable energy such as solar or wind power.

An alternative hypothesis is that carbon-based fuel is virtually inexhaustible in human terms, if one includes all sources of carbon-based energy such as methane hydrates on the sea floor, which are much greater than all other carbon-based fossil fuel resources combined. These sources of carbon are also considered non-renewable, although their rate of formation/replenishment on the sea floor is not known. However, their extraction at economically viable costs and rates has yet to be determined.

At present, the main energy source used by humans is non-renewable fossil fuels. Since the dawn of internal combustion engine technologies in the 19th century, petroleum and other fossil fuels have remained in continual demand. As a result, conventional infrastructure and transport systems, which are fitted to combustion engines, remain predominant around the globe.

The modern-day fossil fuel economy is widely criticized for its lack of renewability, as well as being a contributor to climate change.

== Nuclear fuels ==
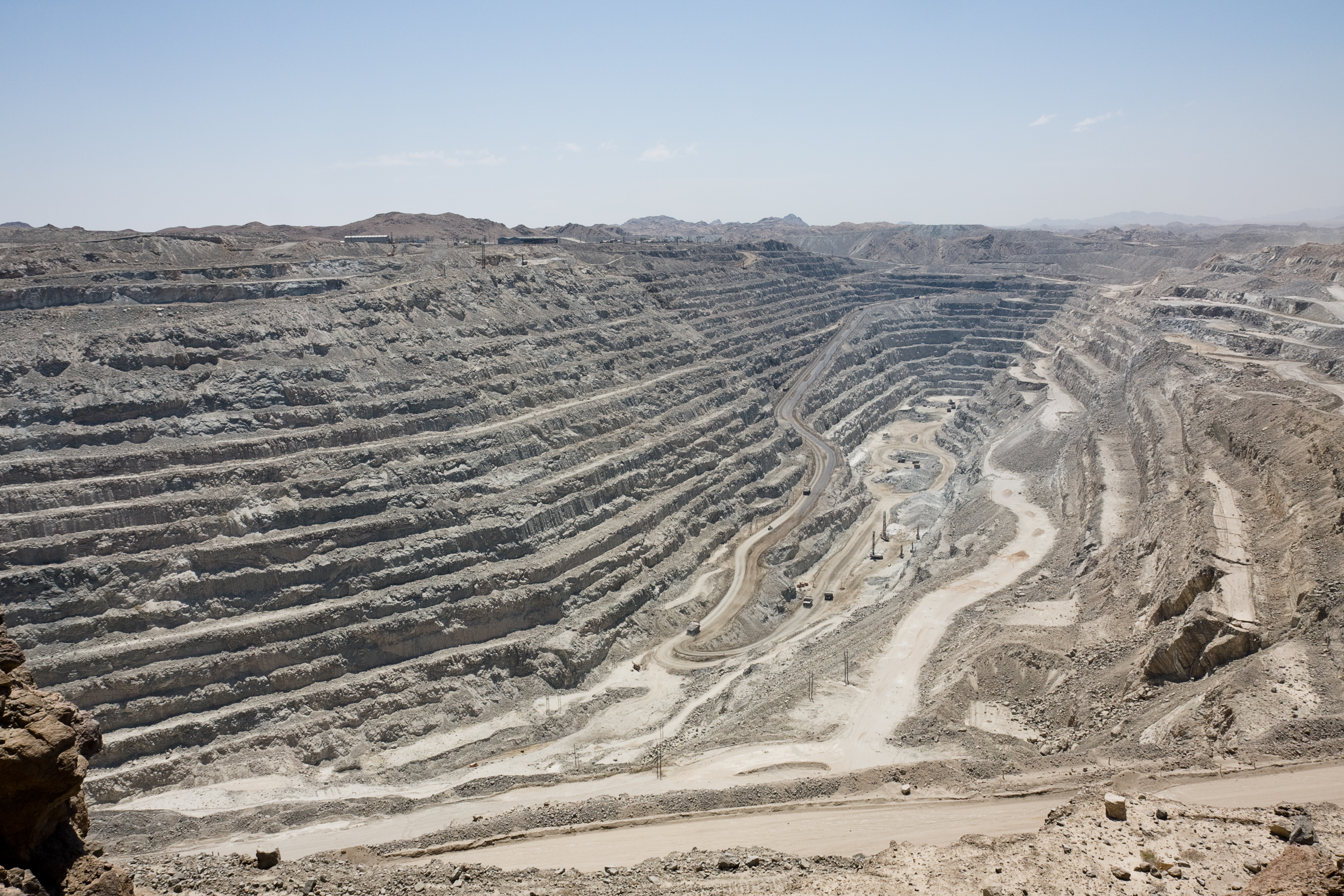
Rössing uranium mine is the longest-running and one of the largest open pit uranium mines in the world; in 2005 it produced eight percent of global uranium oxide needs (3,711 tons). The most productive mines are the underground McArthur River uranium mine in Canada, which produces 13% of the world's uranium, and the underground poly-metallic Olympic Dam mine in Australia, which is mainly a copper mine, but contains the largest known reserve of uranium ore.

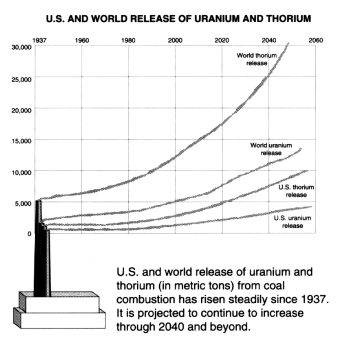
Annual release of "technologically enhanced"/concentrated naturally occurring radioactive material, uranium and thorium radioisotopes naturally found in coal and concentrated in heavy/bottom coal ash and airborne fly ash. As predicted by ORNL to cumulatively amount to 2.9 million tons over the 1937–2040 period, from the combustion of an estimated 637 billion tons of coal worldwide. This 2.9 million tons of actinide fuel, a resource derived from coal ash, would be classified as low grade uranium ore if it occurred naturally.

In 1987, the World Commission on Environment and Development (WCED) classified fission reactors that produce more fissile nuclear fuel than they consume (i.e. breeder reactors) among conventional renewable energy sources, such as solar and falling water. The American Petroleum Institute likewise does not consider conventional nuclear fission as renewable, but rather that breeder reactor nuclear power fuel is considered renewable and sustainable, noting that radioactive waste from used spent fuel rods remains radioactive and so has to be very carefully stored for several hundred years. With the careful monitoring of radioactive waste products also being required upon the use of other renewable energy sources, such as geothermal energy.

The use of nuclear technology relying on fission requires naturally occurring radioactive material as fuel. Uranium, the most common fission fuel, is present in the ground at relatively low concentrations and mined in 19 countries. This mined uranium is used to fuel energy-generating nuclear reactors with fissionable uranium-235 which generates heat that is ultimately used to power turbines to generate electricity.

As of 2013 only a few kilograms (picture available) of uranium have been extracted from the ocean in pilot programs and it is also believed that the uranium extracted on an industrial scale from the seawater would constantly be replenished from uranium leached from the ocean floor, maintaining the seawater concentration at a stable level. In 2014, with the advances made in the efficiency of seawater uranium extraction, a paper in the journal of Marine Science & Engineering suggests that with, light water reactors as its target, the process would be economically competitive if implemented on a large scale.

Nuclear power provides about 6% of the world's energy and 13–14% of the world's electricity. Nuclear energy production is associated with potentially dangerous radioactive contamination as it relies upon unstable elements. In particular, nuclear power facilities produce about 200,000 metric tons of low and intermediate level waste (LILW) and 10,000 metric tons of high level waste (HLW) (including spent fuel designated as waste) each year worldwide.

Separate from the question of the sustainability of nuclear fuel use are concerns about the high-level radioactive waste the nuclear industry generates, which if not properly contained, is highly hazardous to people and wildlife. The United Nations (UNSCEAR) estimated in 2008 that average annual human radiation exposure includes 0.01 millisievert (mSv) from the legacy of past atmospheric nuclear testing plus the Chernobyl disaster and the nuclear fuel cycle, along with 2.0 mSv from natural radioisotopes and 0.4 mSv from cosmic rays; all exposures vary by location. Natural uranium in some inefficient reactor nuclear fuel cycles becomes part of the nuclear waste "once through" stream, and in a similar manner to the scenario were this uranium remained naturally in the ground, this uranium emits various forms of radiation in a decay chain that has a half-life of about 4.5 billion years. The storage of this unused uranium and the accompanying fission reaction products has raised public concerns about risks of leaks and containment, however studies conducted on the natural nuclear fission reactor in Oklo Gabon, have informed geologists on the proven processes that kept the waste from this 2 billion year old natural nuclear reactor.

== Land surface ==
Land surface can be considered both a renewable and non-renewable resource depending on the scope of comparison. Land can be reused, but new land cannot be created on demand, making it a fixed resource with perfectly inelastic supply from an economic perspective.

== Renewable resources ==
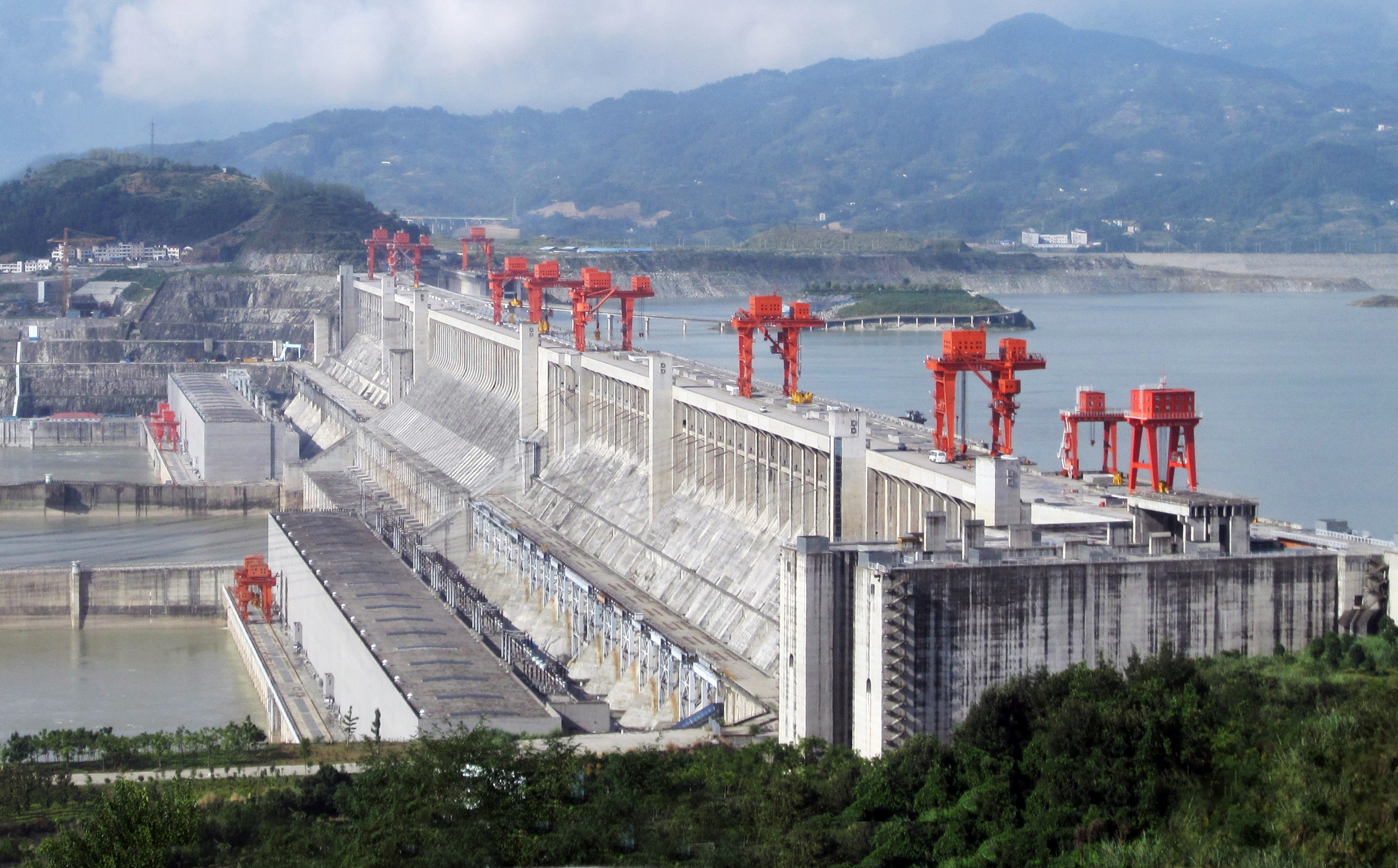
The Three Gorges Dam, the largest renewable energy generating station in the world.

Natural resources, known as renewable resources, are replaced by natural processes and forces persistent in the natural environment. There are intermittent and reoccurring renewables, and recyclable materials, which are utilized during a cycle across a certain amount of time, and can be harnessed for any number of cycles.

The production of goods and services by manufacturing products in economic systems creates many types of waste during production and after the consumer has made use of it. The material is then either incinerated, buried in a landfill or recycled for reuse. Recycling turns materials of value that would otherwise become waste into valuable resources again.

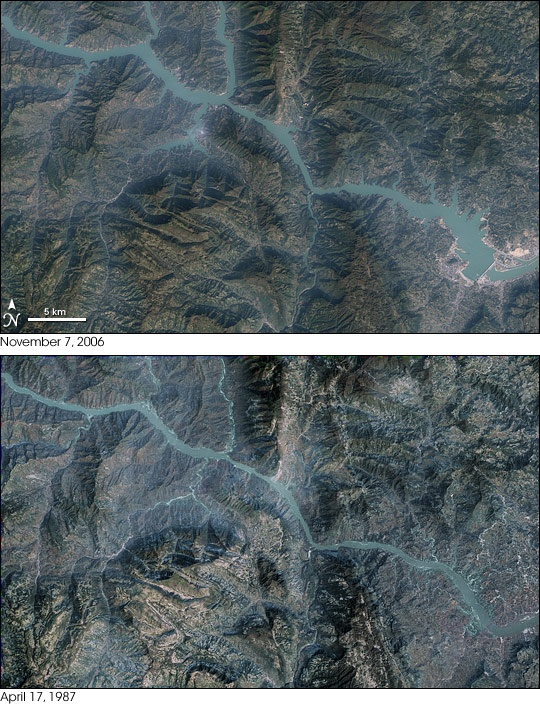
Satellite map showing areas flooded by the Three Gorges reservoir. Compare 7 November 2006 (above) with 17 April 1987 (below). The energy station required the flooding of archaeological and cultural sites and displaced some 1.3 million people, and is causing significant ecological changes, including an increased risk of landslides. The dam has been a controversial topic both domestically and abroad.

In the natural environment water, forests, plants and animals are all renewable resources, as long as they are adequately monitored, protected and conserved. Sustainable agriculture is the cultivation of plant and animal materials in a manner that preserves plant and animal ecosystems and that can improve soil health and soil fertility over the long term. The overfishing of the oceans is one example of where an industry practice or method can threaten an ecosystem, endanger species and possibly even determine whether or not a fishery is sustainable for use by humans. An unregulated industry practice or method can lead to a complete resource depletion.

The renewable energy from the sun, wind, wave, biomass and geothermal energies are based on renewable resources. Renewable resources such as the movement of water (hydropower, tidal power and wave power), wind and radiant energy from geothermal heat (used for geothermal power) and solar energy (used for solar power) are practically infinite and cannot be depleted, unlike their non-renewable counterparts, which are likely to run out if not used sparingly. While current generation from renewable sources does not meet energy needs, estimates show that various types of renewable energies can make up a significant portion of, or even exceed, energy demands.

Renewable energy and energy efficiency are no longer niche sectors that are promoted only by governments and environmentalists. The increasing levels of investment and capital from conventional financial actors suggest that sustainable energy has become mainstream and the future of energy production, as non-renewable resources decline. This is reinforced by climate change concerns, nuclear dangers and accumulating radioactive waste, high oil prices, peak oil and increasing government support for renewable energy. These factors are commercializing renewable energy, enlarging the market and increasing the adoption of new products to replace obsolete technology and the conversion of existing infrastructure to a renewable standard.

== Economic models ==
In economics, a non-renewable resource is defined as goods whose greater consumption today implies less consumption tomorrow. David Ricardo in his early works analysed the pricing of exhaustible resources, and argued that the price of a mineral resource should increase over time. He argued that the spot price is always determined by the mine with the highest cost of extraction, and mine owners with lower extraction costs benefit from a differential rent. The first model is defined by Hotelling's rule, which is a 1931 economic model of non-renewable resource management by Harold Hotelling. It shows that efficient exploitation of a nonrenewable and nonaugmentable resource would, under otherwise stable conditions, lead to a depletion of the resource. The rule states that this would lead to a net price or "Hotelling rent" for it that rises annually at a rate equal to the rate of interest, reflecting the increasing scarcity of the resources. The Hartwick's rule provides an important result about the sustainability of welfare in an economy that uses non-renewable resources.

== See also ==
- Clean technology
- Energy conservation
- Eurosolar
- Fossil fuel
- Fossil water
- Green design
- Hartwick's rule
- Hermann Scheer
- Hotelling's rule
- Hubbert's peak
- Liebig's law of the minimum
- Natural resource management
- Overfishing
- Peak oil
- Reserves-to-production ratio
- Sustainability
