= Steven C. Salop =

American economist and academic (born 1946)

- Born: December 23, 1946 (age 79)
- Known for: Work regarding the concept of raising rivals' costs

Academic background
- Education: University of Pennsylvania (B.A.); Yale University (Ph.D)

Academic work
- Institutions: Georgetown University Law Center

Steven C. Salop (born December 23, 1946) is an American economist and academic whose work focuses on antitrust policy. He is a professor of economics and law at the Georgetown University Law Center. Salop is known for his scholarship on exclusionary practices and vertical mergers. Together with David Scheffman, he popularized the concept of raising rivals' costs as an antitrust violation.

== Education ==
Salop earned his undergraduate degree at the University of Pennsylvania in 1968 and a Ph.D. in economics from Yale University in 1972.

== Career ==
Before joining the Georgetown Law faculty in 1981, he served as associate director for Special Projects with the Bureau of Economics of the Federal Trade Commission, as an adjunct professor of economics at the University of Pennsylvania. He was also an economist with the Civil Aeronautics Board and Federal Reserve Board.

Salop teaches courses in Antitrust Law, Economic Reasoning and the Law, and has conducted a Faculty Workshop in Law and Economics. He does consulting work at Charles River Associates.

== Awards ==
Salop is a recipient of the AALS Antitrust Lifetime Achievement Award (2019) and the AAI Antitrust Achievement Award (2010).
