= Bundling (antitrust law) =

Bundling is the setting of the total price of a purchase of several products or services from one seller at a lower level than the sum of the prices of the products or services purchased separately from several sellers. Typically, one of the bundled items (the "primary product") is available only from the seller engaging in the bundling, while the other item or items (the "secondary product") can be obtained from several sellers. The effect of the practice is to divert purchasers who need the primary product to the bundling seller and away from other sellers of only the secondary product. For that reason, the practice may be held an antitrust violation as it was in SmithKline Corp. v. Eli Lilly & Co. and LePage's, Inc. v. 3M.

== See also ==
- Product bundling
- Unbundling
