= LePage's, Inc. v. 3M =

- Court: United States Court of Appeals for the Third Circuit
- Full case name: LePage's, Incorporated; Lepage's Management Company, L.L.C. v. 3M (Minnesota Mining and Manufacturing Company); Kroll Associates, Inc.
- Argued: July 12, 2001
- Reargued: October 30, 2002
- Decided: March 25, 2003
- Citation: 324 F.3d 141

Case history
- Subsequent history: Cert. denied, 542 U.S. 953 (2004)

Court membership
- Judges sitting: Edward R. Becker, Dolores Korman Sloviter, Anthony Joseph Scirica, Richard Lowell Nygaard, Samuel Alito, Theodore McKee, Thomas L. Ambro, Julio M. Fuentes, D. Brooks Smith, Morton Ira Greenberg (en banc)

Case opinions
- Majority: Sloviter, joined by Becker, Nygaard, McKee, Ambro, Fuentes, Smith
- Dissent: Greenberg, joined by Scirica, Alito

Laws applied
- Sherman Antitrust Act; Clayton Antitrust Act of 1914

Keywords
- Bundling

LePage's Inc. v. 3M, 324 F.3d 141 (3d Cir. 2003), is a 2003 en banc decision of the United States Court of Appeals for the Third Circuit upholding a jury verdict against bundling. Bundling is the setting of the total price of a purchase of several products or services over a period from one seller at a lower level than the sum of the prices of the products or services purchased separately from several sellers over the period. Typically, one of the bundled items (the "primary product" or "monopoly product" or "non-contestable product") is available only from the seller engaging in the bundling, while the other item or items (the "secondary product" or "contestable product") can be obtained from several sellers. The effect of the bundling is to divert purchasers who need the primary product to the bundling seller and away from other sellers of only the secondary product. For that reason, the practice may be held an antitrust violation as it was in the LePage's case, in which the Third Circuit held that 3M engaged in monopolization in violation of Sherman Act § 2 by (1) offering rebates to customers conditioned on purchases spanning six of 3M's different product lines, and (2) entering into contracts that expressly or effectively required dealing exclusively with 3M.

== Background ==
3M manufactures Scotch Tape brand of tape, which accounted for 90% of the U.S. transparent tape market until the early 1990s, concededly a monopoly. Around 1980 LePage's decided to sell private label transparent tape, which is tape sold under the retailer's name rather than under the name of the manufacturer. By 1992, LePage's sold 88% of U.S. private label tape, which represented, however, only a small portion of the U.S. transparent tape market. LePage's sold its private label tape to retailers at a lower price to the retailer and the customer than branded tape such as Scotch Tape.

In response to the growth of this market segment, 3M entered this submarket with a second, "off brand" tape and private-label tape. In addition, 3M engaged in actions allegedly aimed at restricting the availability of cheap off-brand transparent tape to consumers, including establishing a bundling program that prevented LePage's from gaining or maintaining large volume sales. Allegedly, 3M maintained its monopoly by stifling growth of private label tape and by coordinating efforts aimed at large distributors to keep retail prices for Scotch Tape high.

LePage's sued 3M, asserting that 3M used its monopoly over its Scotch Tape brand to gain a competitive advantage in the private-label tape portion of the transparent-tape market through the use of a "multi-tiered, bundled rebate" program. This program gave progressively higher rebates when customers purchased greater amounts of products in a number of 3M's different product lines.

The jury returned a verdict for LePage's on the monopolization claim under § 2 of the Sherman Act, and assessed damages of $23 million. The jury found in 3M's favor on LePage's claims under § 1 of the Sherman Act and § 3 of the Clayton Act.

Cross-appeals to the Third Circuit followed, and the court heard the case en banc.

== Ruling of Third Circuit ==
The en banc court affirmed the jury verdict (7-3).

=== Majority opinion ===
The Third Circuit majority began by explaining the issue before it:

The sole remaining issue and our focus on this appeal is whether 3M took steps to maintain [its monopoly] power in a manner that violated § 2 of the Sherman Act. A monopolist willfully acquires or maintains monopoly power when it competes on some basis other than the merits.

LePage's argued that 3M willfully maintained its monopoly in the transparent tape market by bundling rebates and entering into contracts that expressly or effectively required dealing exclusively with 3M. 3M argued that its challenged conduct was legal because it never priced its transparent tape below its cost. The Third Circuit said this was "the most significant legal issue in this case because it underlies 3M's argument." 3M's position was that "above-cost pricing cannot give rise to an antitrust offense as a matter of law, since it is the very conduct that the antitrust laws wish to promote in the interest of making consumers better off." In its oral argument before the court, 3M counsel stated that "if the big guy is selling above cost, it has done nothing which offends the Sherman Act" and that is "the end of the story."

The court was unwilling to accept 3M's argument that "no conduct by a monopolist who sells its product above cost—no matter how exclusionary the conduct—can constitute monopolization in violation of § 2 of the Sherman Act." The court said, "The history of the interpretation of § 2 of the Sherman Act demonstrates the lack of foundation for 3M's premise." the Third Circuit insisted that the Supreme Court's "consistent holdings [were] that a monopolist will be found to violate § 2 of the Sherman Act if it engages in exclusionary or predatory conduct without a valid business justification." The court then turned to 3M's specific acts.

==== Bundling ====
3M offered many of LePage's major customers substantial rebates (often $1 million or more) to induce them to reduce or stop their purchases of tape from LePage's. 3M's rebate programs offered discounts to certain customers conditioned on purchases in six of 3M's diverse, unrelated product lines. The product lines covered by the rebate program were: Health Care Products, Home Care Products, Home Improvement Products, Stationery Products (including transparent tape), Retail Auto Products, and Leisure Time products. 3M's rebate programs set customer-specific target growth rates in each product line. The size of the rebate was linked to the number of product lines in which targets were met, and the number of targets met by the buyer determined the size of the rebate it would receive on all of its purchases. If a customer failed to meet the target for any one product, its failure would cause it to lose the rebate across the line. The court observed, "This created a substantial incentive for each customer to meet the targets across all product lines to maximize its rebates." The penalties for not meeting targets would have been hundreds of thousands of dollars."

As in the SmithKline case, "where we held that conduct substantially identical to 3M's was anticompetitive and sustained the finding of a violation of § 2," 3M's competitors did not have as diverse a product line and thus could not offer comparable discounts in net dollar terms. The "effect of 3M's rebates were even more powerfully magnified than those in SmithKline because 3M's rebates" applied to so much more extensive product lines. "In some cases, these magnified rebates to a particular customer were as much as half of LePage's entire prior tape sales to that customer." Therefore, "3M's conduct was at least as anticompetitive as the conduct which this court held violated § 2 in SmithKline."

==== Exclusive dealing ====
The court reviewed the evidence and concluded that the jury could reasonably find that 3M gave payments to retailers to deal exclusively with 3M, thereby foreclosing LePage's from that portion of the market.

==== Business justifications ====
Finally, the court dismissed 3M's proffered justifications. There was evidence from which the jury could have determined that 3M intended to force LePage's from the market, and then cease or severely curtail its own private-label business in favor of its Scotch Tape sales, and that 3M wanted to "kill" the private-label market, because it was diverting Scotch Tape sales.

The majority therefore concluded: "There was ample evidence that 3M used its market power over transparent tape, backed by its considerable catalog of products, to entrench its monopoly to the detriment of LePage's, its only serious competitor, in violation of § 2 of the Sherman Act."

=== Dissenting opinion ===
Judge Greenberg dissented, joined by Judge Scirica and Judge Alito, as to the monopolization claim, but agreed as to LePage's's cross-appeal from the motion granting 3M a judgment as a matter of law on the attempted maintenance of monopoly claim. Greenberg insisted that LePage's "simply did not establish that 3M's conduct was illegal, as LePage's did not demonstrate that 3M's pricing was below cost (a point that is not in dispute) and, in the absence of such proof, the record does not supply any other basis on which we can uphold the judgment." He disagreed with the majority's use of the SmithKline case. His view of the evidence was that LePage's lost private sale tape business for reasons not related to 3M's rebates. He added, "Contrary to the majority's view, this is not a situation in which there is no business justification for 3M's actions," because 3M's bundling created "efficiency in having single invoices, single shipments and uniform pricing programs for various products." He accused the majority of "curtailing price competition and a method of pricing beneficial to customers because the bundled rebates effectively lowered their costs."

=== Denial of certiorari ===
3M petitioned the Supreme Court for certiorari, but the Court denied it. Before deciding, the Court called for the views of the Solicitor General, who argued that it would be premature for the Supreme Court to rule on bundling until the issue of its legality had percolated more in the lower courts.

== Commentary ==
● Professor Kauper, in his critique of the LePage's case, noted that the Third Circuit opinion "provoked a strong outcry from the business community," including a "large number of amicus briefs . . . filed in support of 3M's [unsuccessful] petition for certiorari, all arguing that bundled rebates should be unlawful only" if the rebates made the sales below cost and, in addition, "suggesting all kinds of dire consequences should the Court of Appeals decision stand." He points out that despite artifice, the petition (as does the case) "squarely raises the issue of whether Section Two liability can ever attach where the exclusion can be said to result from an above-cost price." Kauper recognizes that "businesses would be comforted by a bright line, below cost standard—a kind of safe harbor against most claims of exclusion based on the pricing of a dominant firm," but he "take[s] the parade of horribles put forth by petitioner and its amici with a degree of skepticism."

Kauper argues that bundling is a rebate subject to a condition. "Conditioned rebates essentially buy something the manufacturer wants and the buyer is prepared to give if the price is right." The effect, he says, is equivalent to an exclusive dealing agreement, and therefore the same analysis should be used (essentially, the rule of reason). "Exclusivity in limited circumstances could work to exclude rivals without legitimate justification. This should be the focus of the inquiry." That outcome (exclusivity) can be achieved without selling below cost. All that a below–cost requirement accomplishes is to show that "the rebates could not be matched by an equally efficient firm," but that should not be decisive. For example, "a new entrant or a small but expanding firm, for example, cannot be expected to have achieved the full economies of a dominant firm."

● Professor Hovenkamp and his son discussed bundling from an econometric vantage, in an article in the Buffalo Law Review. They begin by describing the different varieties of bundled discounts:

- The seller might offer a 10% discount to a buyer who takes product A from the buyer, provided that the buyer purchases product B as well. The seller might offer the discount on each purchase of one unit of A, provided that it is accompanied by one unit of B.
- The seller might condition the discount or rebate on purchases of both A and B, but without specifying the proportion, leaving the customer to determine its needs for the two products. It might do this by stipulating a "market share" percentage rather than a requirement of all purchases. For example, it might provide for a 10% discount to buyers who agree to take at least 70% of their needs of both A and B from the seller, but without specifying the percentage of each.
- The seller might do the same thing but with three, four or even a dozen products rather than two.

The terms can vary widely, here, "but the most obvious variables are (1) the number of goods in the bundle; (2) the proportion of the goods in the bundle, and whether the proportion is specified in an any sense or left completely up to the customer; and (3) the percentage share of its needs that the customer must purchase from the seller in order to obtain the discount."

They then provide an example to show how a multi-product firm can place a firm with a smaller product line at a competitive disadvantage by using bundling, because the discount must be "amortized" over the larger or smaller range of products that the seller offers, so that the seller with the smaller range of goods over which to amortize the discount must offer a higher percentage discount to match the overall sum of the other's discounts:

[S]uppose that a dominant firm produces goods A and B at a cost of $5 and $7, respectively. It sells the two goods separately for $10 each per unit but offers a 20% discount to anyone who will take a bundle of one A good and one B good. Note that this discounted price, $16, is well above the firm's costs, which are $12. However, a rival sells only B, for which its production costs are also $7. If a customer wants the rival's B good it loses the discount from the dominant firm on the A good. As a result, the customer must pay $10 for the dominant firm's A, and at least $7, the cost price, for the rival firm's B. The rival will be unable to capture the sale of B even though it is equally efficient, in the sense that its production costs for B are the same as those faced by the dominant firm.

They point out that the effect of the practice is to exclude B from the market even though B is an equally efficient producer and A's price is above cost. "[T]he practice is nevertheless 'exclusionary' in the sense that the rival cannot profitably compete with it, at least to those customers who wish to purchase As and Bs together and in equal amounts. They explain, "What the antitrust cases involving bundled discounts have in common is that the rival makes only a subset of the goods in the bundle and cannot readily add in the extra goods that would enable it to produce the full range."

They explain further how a dominant multi-product firm can exclude small rivals with only small bundling discounts:

[S]uppose that the dominant firm makes 10 products that cost $9 each and sell individually for $10 each, but offers a 2% discount to those who take a full set, resulting in a price of $98. The rival makes only product, number 10, which it can sell to the customer for $9, but then the customer will have to pay $90 for the other 9 products from the dominant firm, for a total of $99. . . . Indeed, in this particular example any discount above 1% will exclude the rival from the trade of those customers who want the entire package; but such trivial discounts are almost certainly justified by cost savings in contracting or delivery, if not in production.

The authors conclude that bundling practices are so diverse that it is difficult to generalize whether a given bundling practice is harmful, but the "type of multi-product bundling most likely to cause harm is that which was at issue in LePage's, where the defendant offered evidently custom-made bundles to different large customers in order to get them to drop the plaintiff's line of cellophane tape."

● John Thorne, in a 2005 article, argues "that a dominant firm's offering above-cost discounts for volume purchases, of either individual products or multiple products, should be per se lawful under Section 2 of the Sherman Act even if the lower prices tend to shift business away from single-product rivals." He bases this conclusion on three premises:

First, discounted bundles are commonly offered by firms having no market power whatsoever, and therefore no special suspicion should arise when dominant firms offer them. Second, the common offering of bundles is due to numerous efficiency advantages from the point of view of producers and consumers. Third—and the reason that above-cost bundles should not be just presumptively lawful but per se lawful—fact finders are not able reliably to distinguish between efficient bundles and those whose anticompetitive effects outweigh efficiency. Discounted bundles are an area in which the medical profession's oath "first do no harm" is fully applicable. Courts should be especially reluctant to interfere when a dominant firm offers its customers a price break.

He insists that the present legal regime, with its uncertainties for business, creates too great a risk that "condemnation otherwise will rest on sympathy for small firms and distaste for large firms' pursuit of every possible sale, perversely punishing economies of scale and aggressive rivalry that benefit the economy." Not only do juries lack competence to evaluate the balance between anticompetitive and procompetitive aspects of bundling, but so do courts. Deciding what are proper bundles may be "beyond the practical ability of a judicial tribunal to control."

== See also ==
- Bundling (antitrust law)
- Raising rivals' costs
