= Hotelling's law =

Observation in economics

Hotelling's law is an observation in economics that in many markets it is rational for producers to make their products as similar as possible. This is also referred to as the principle of minimum differentiation as well as Hotelling's linear city model. The observation was made by Harold Hotelling (1895–1973) in the article "Stability in Competition" in the Economic Journal in 1929.

The opposing phenomenon is product differentiation, which is usually considered to be a business advantage if executed properly.

== Example ==
Suppose there are two competing shops located along the length of a street diverse running north and south, with customers spread equally along the street. Both shop owners want their shops to be where they will get most market share of customers. If both shops sell the same range of goods at the same prices, then the locations of the shops are themselves the 'products'. Each customer will always choose the nearer shop, as it is disadvantageous to travel to the farther one.

=== One shop ===
For a single shop, the optimal location is anywhere along the length of the street. The shop owner is completely indifferent about the location of the shop since it will draw all customers to it, by default. However, from the point of view of a social welfare function that tries to minimize the distance that people need to travel, the optimal point is halfway along the length of the street.

=== Two shops: halfway ===
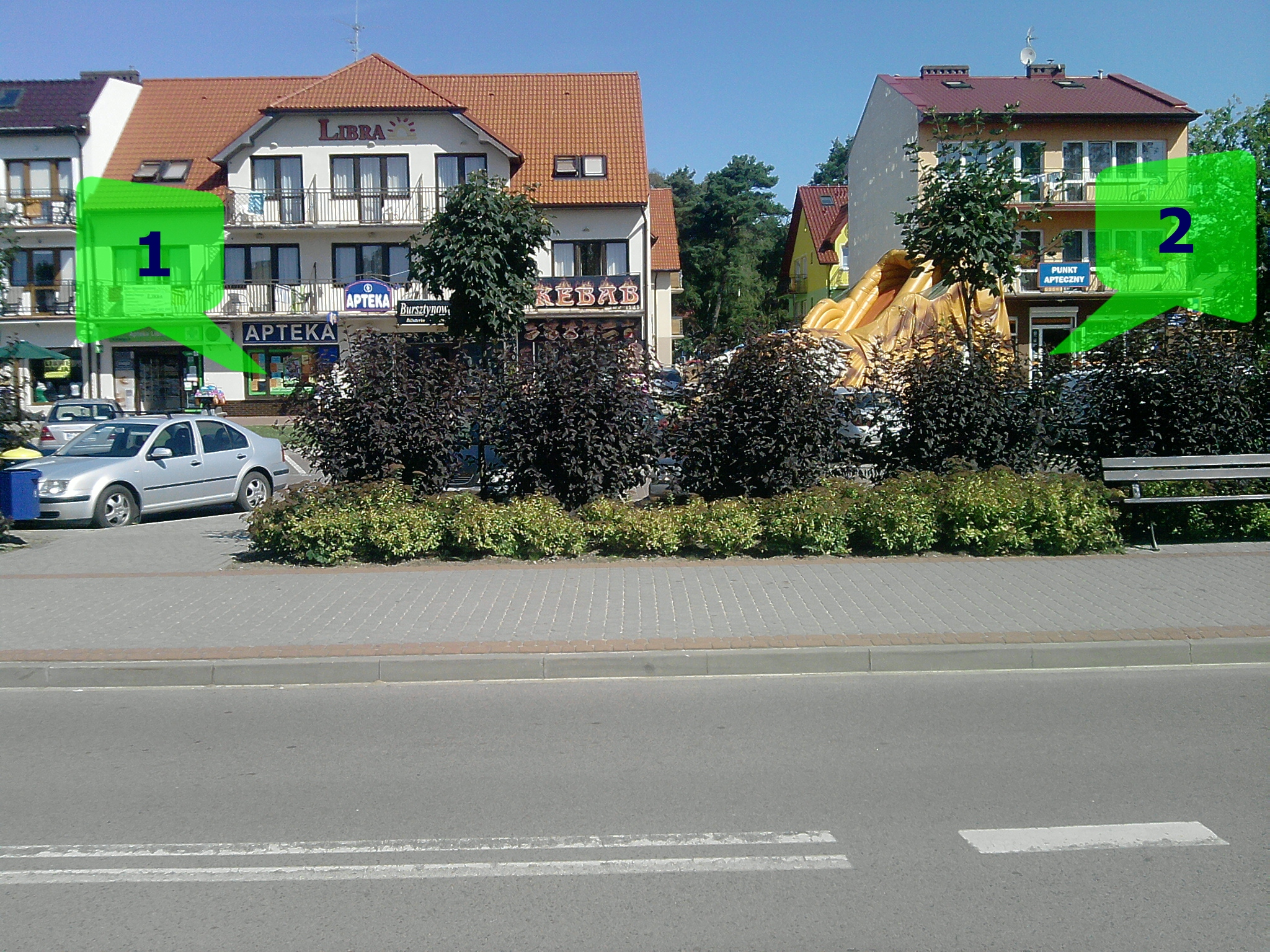
Two pharmacies on the same street, possibly an effect of Hotelling's location competition

Hotelling's law predicts that a street with two shops will also find both shops right next to each other at the same halfway point. Each shop will serve half the market; one will draw all customers from the north, the other all customers from the south.

Two food carts on a beach, where each person on the beach buys from the closest cart. Cart A can attract more customers by moving to the right; cart B by moving to the left.

Another example of the law in action is that of two takeaway food carts, one at each end of a beach. If there is an equal distribution of rational consumers along the beach, each cart will get half the customers, divided by an invisible line equidistant from the carts. But each cart owner will be tempted to move their cart slightly towards the other, moving the invisible line so that the owner is on the side with more than half the beach. Eventually, the cart operators will end up next to each other in the center of the beach.

In the case of three pushcarts, an unstable equilibrium is reached. Imagine carts A and B are adjacent, and each has access to half the potential customers (A’s to the left, B’s to the right). A new cart C can locate to the right of B, blocking B’s access to customers. B would then move to the right of C, blocking all of C’s customers, and the cycle would continue. Despite the constant battle for position, pushcarts follow Hotelling’s Law and aggregate near the center of the street.

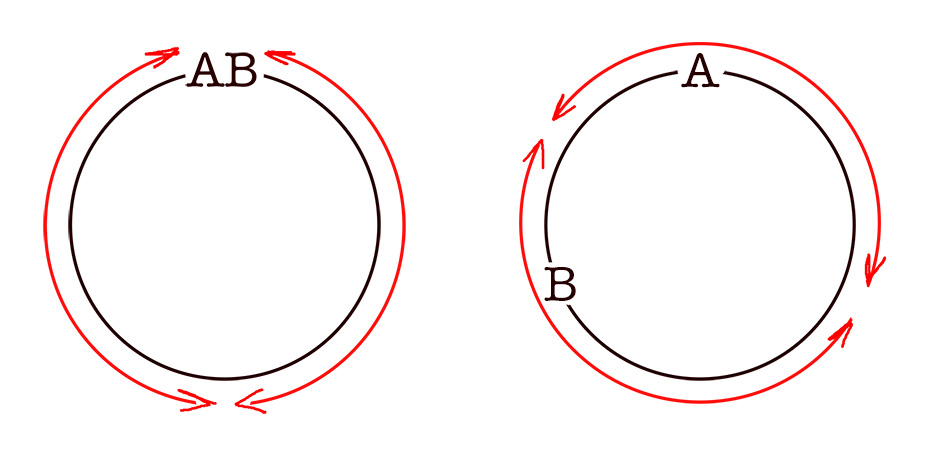
On a circular path, two carts always have half of the customers each (indicated by red arrows)

Unlike a linear road, in the case of a circular path, two pushcarts A and B can locate anywhere along the path and equally share customers. However, introducing a third pushcart again forces all three into an unstable equilibrium where two carts can entirely block a third’s access to customers, and all three carts cluster somewhere along the circle in a battle for position.

=== Social optimum ===
It would be more socially beneficial if the shops separated themselves and moved to one quarter of the way along the street from each end — each would still draw half the customers, but customers would, on average, make a shorter journey. However, neither shop would be willing to do this independently, as it would then allow the other to relocate and capture more than half the market.

=== Deviating assumptions ===
When people along the street, or along the range of possible different product positions, consume more than a minimum number of goods (i.e., have discretionary income), companies can position their products to sections where consumers exist to maximize profit; this will often mean that companies will position themselves in different sections of the street, occupying niche markets. When prices are not fixed, companies can modify their prices to compete for customers; in those cases, it may be in the companies' best interests to differentiate themselves as far away from each other as possible so they face less competition from each other. However, this law of differentiation applies only if consumers face quadratic transportation costs. If transportation costs are instead linear (consumer dissatisfaction increases at a constant rate with distance), there is no equilibrium.

=== Political science ===
In a democracy, and especially in the American two-party system, political parties want to maximize the vote share allocated to their candidate. In theory, this means that political parties will adjust their platform to comply with the median voters' preferences. The Comparative Midpoints Model represents this idea best: Both political parties will get as close as possible to the competing party's platform while preserving their own identity. However, party primaries can complicate this dynamic and make the stable points harder to find.

== Application ==
The street is a metaphor for product differentiation; in the specific case of a street, the stores differentiate themselves from each other by location. The example can be generalized to all other types of horizontal product differentiation in almost any product characteristic, such as sweetness, colour, or size. The above case where the two stores are side by side would translate into products that are identical to each other. This phenomenon is present in many markets, particularly in those considered to be primarily commodities, and results in less variety for the consumer.

== In real life ==
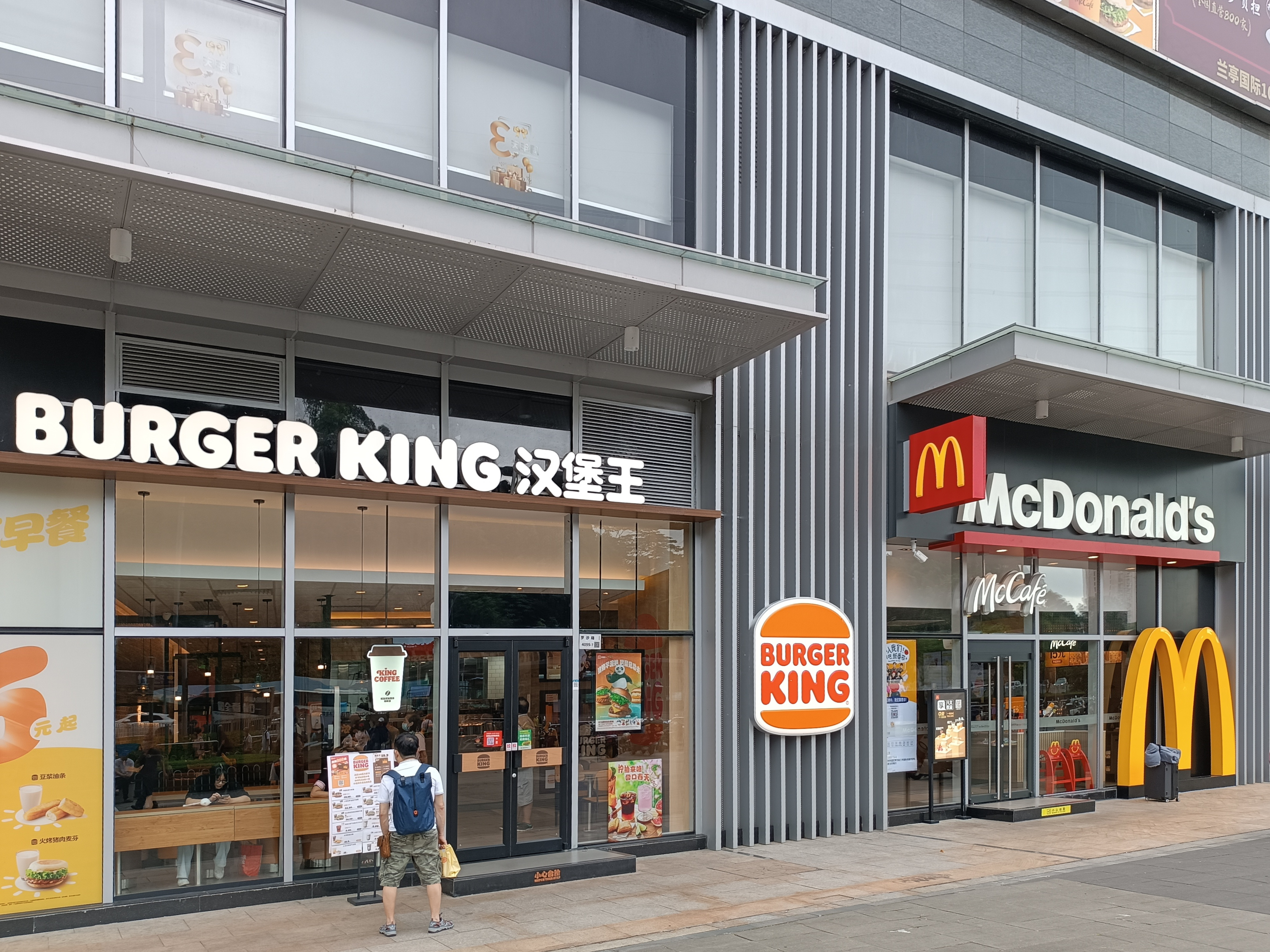
Next door branches of Burger King and McDonalds in Lanting Guoji Mingyuan, Shenzhen

This phenomenon can be observed in real life, where commodity businesses like bars, restaurants, and gas stations, as well as large, branded chains, are located close to their rivals:

- McDonald's and Burger King
- McDonald's and Jollibee in the Philippines
- Alfamart and Indomaret in Indonesia
- Target and Walmart in the United States
- Lowe's and Home Depot in the United States
- CVS and Walgreens in the United States
- Whole Foods and Trader Joe's in the United States

== See also ==
- Location model
- Braess's paradox
- Nash equilibrium
- Median voter theorem
- Commoditization
- Central place theory
