= Hartwick's rule =

In resource economics, Hartwick's rule defines the amount of investment in produced capital (buildings, roads, knowledge stocks, etc.) that is needed to exactly offset declining stocks of non-renewable resources. This investment is undertaken so that the standard of living does not fall as society moves into the indefinite future. Solow (1974) shows that, given a degree of substitutability between produced capital and natural resources, one way to design a sustainable consumption program for an economy is to accumulate produced capital sufficiently rapidly so that the pinch from the shrinking exhaustible resource stock is precisely countered by the services from the enlarged produced capital stock. Hartwick's rule – often abbreviated as "invest resource rents" – requires that a nation invest all rent earned from exhaustible resources currently extracted, where "rent" is defined along paths that maximize returns to owners of the resource stock. The rule extends to the case of many types of capital goods, including a vector of stocks of natural capital.

The difference between total investment in some kinds of capital and total disinvestment in other types of capital has been labelled "genuine savings". Genuine savings has been estimated for many countries by the World Bank and other authors (Hamilton and Atkinson, 2006, chapter 6). A positive value for a nation's genuine savings have been linked to the possibility of long-run economic sustainability.

== Criticism ==
Ecological economist Clive Spash criticized Hartwick's Rule for its "self-evident lack of realism". It depends on man-made capital for: failing to depreciate, for substituting rather than complementing natural capital, and for being unrelated to rather than produced from natural capital.
