= Lerner (surname) =

Lerner (/ˈlɜːrnə/ LUR-nə) is a German surname, a variant of Larner. Originating from southern Germany, it may be either a habitational name for someone from Lern, near the Bavarian town of Freising, or a nickname from Middle High German lerner, meaning "pupil" or "schoolboy". It can also be a Ashkenazic Jewish occupational name, from Yiddish lerner, meaning "Talmudic student or scholar". In England, the name is recorded from the 13th century, first found in London where they held a family seat as lords of the manor. Variations include Delawny, Delauney, De Laune, De Lune, Delaune, Delorney, and others.

Notable people with the surname Lerner include:

- Aaron Bunsen Lerner (1920–2007), American physician, researcher and professor
- Abba P. Lerner, American economist
- Adam Lerner, American museum curator
- Adam B. Lerner, American political scientist
- Al Lerner, American businessman, chairman of MBNA
- Al Lerner (composer), American musician, pianist, and big band leader
- Alan Jay Lerner, American lyricist and librettist
- Alejandro Lerner, Argentine musician
- Avi Lerner, Israeli-American film producer
- Barron H. Lerner, American professor of medicine
- Ben Lerner, American poet
- César Lerner, Argentine film composer
- Claire Lerner, American non-profit director
- Danny Lerner, Israeli filmmaker, co-founder of Millennium Media
- David Lerner (1951–1997), American poet
- Edward (Ned) Lerner, computer-game maker
- Edward M. Lerner, science-fiction writer
- Eric Lerner, American scientist and popular science author
- Gad Lerner, Italian journalist and writer
- George Lerner, American inventor of the toy Mr. Potato Head
- Gerda Lerner, Austrian-American scholar, a founder of the fields of women and African American history
- Hayyim Zvi Lerner (1815–1889), Russian grammarian of Hebrew, writer and educator
- Irving Lerner, alleged Soviet spy in the US during World War II
- I. Michael Lerner (1910–1977), Chinese-American geneticist and evolutionary biologist
- Jacqueline Lerner, American psychologist
- Jaime Lerner, architect and urban planner, Brazilian state governor
- Jennifer Lerner, American professor and experimental social psychologist
- Jimmy Lerner, American poet, novelist, and criminal
- Josh Lerner, American economist, professor at the Harvard Business School
- Kari Lerner, American politician
- Ken Lerner, American actor
- Konstantin Lerner, Ukrainian chess grandmaster
- Laurence Lerner (1925–2016), South African British literary critic, poet and novelist
- Leo Lerner (1907–1965), American newspaper journalist, editor and publisher
- Lois Lerner (born 1950), American lawyer
- Mark Lerner, American businessman
- Max Lerner, American journalist and educator
- Melvin J. Lerner, American professor of social psychology
- Michael Lerner (disambiguation), multiple people
- Murray Lerner, American film director and producer
- Osip Mikhailovich Lerner (1847–1907), Russian Jewish intellectual and lawyer
- Peter Lerner, Israeli Defense Forces spokesperson
- Randy Lerner, American entrepreneur and sports team owner
- Richard Lerner, American research chemist
- Rita G. Lerner (1929–1994), American physicist and science communicator
- Robert E. Lerner, American medieval historian
- Samuel Lerner, Romanian songwriter American theater and film
- Samuel A. Lerner, co-founder of Lerner Shops, uncle of Alan Jay Lerner
- Sam Lerner, American child actor
- Sandra Lerner (born 1955), American businesswoman and philanthropist, co-founder of Cisco Systems
- Sara Hestrin-Lerner, Israeli physiologist
- Sidney Lerner, Manitoba judge
- Stephen Lerner, American labor and community organizer
- Ted Lerner (1925–2023), American real estate developer and billionaire, owner of the Washington Nationals
- Theodor Lerner, German journalist and polar explorer
