= Lerner =

Lerner may refer to:

== Organizations ==
- Lerner Enterprises, a real estate company in Washington, D.C.
- Lerner New York, the former name of the New York & Company clothing chain
- Lerner Newspapers, a former newspaper chain in Chicago
- Lerner Publishing Group, a publisher of children's literature based in Minneapolis

== Other uses ==
- Lerner (surname), a surname; includes list of people with the name
- "Lerner Exchange," an illegal maneuver figuring in the conviction of ex-media baron Conrad Black
- Lerner index, a measure of a firm's market power
- Lerner Theatre, a historic theatre in Elkhart, Indiana, US

== See also ==
- Lerner and Loewe, the musical partnership of lyricist Alan Jay Lerner and composer Frederick Loewe
- Lerner paradox
- Lerner symmetry theorem
