= Metzler paradox =

In economics, the Metzler paradox (named after the American economist Lloyd Metzler) is the theoretical possibility that the imposition of a tariff on imports may reduce the relative internal price of that good. It was proposed by Lloyd Metzler in 1949 upon examination of tariffs within the Heckscher–Ohlin model. The paradox has roughly the same status as immiserizing growth and a transfer that makes the recipient worse off.

This peculiar outcome could occur if the offer curve of the exporting country is highly inelastic. In such a scenario, the tariff reduces the duty-free cost of the imported goods to such an extent that the effect of improving the terms of trade of the tariff-imposing countries on relative prices outweighs the impact of the tariff. Such a tariff would not effectively protect the industry competing with the imported goods.

However, in practice, this scenario is deemed unlikely.

== See also ==
- Leontief paradox
- Lerner paradox
- List of paradoxes
- Rybczynski effect
