= Deb Henretta =

American businesswoman

Deborah Ann "Deb" Henretta is an American businesswoman. She is a senior adviser for General Assembly, a global education and technology company, as well as SSA & Company, a New York-based management consulting firm. Prior to her current position, she retired in 2015 from a 30-year career at Procter & Gamble, culminating in becoming one of only two top-level women executives for the consumer goods organization.

== Early life ==
Henretta, born May 1, 1961, graduated summa cum laude from St. Bonaventure University with a BA in communications in 1983. She earned her MA in advertising research and teaching assistantship from Syracuse University's Newhouse School of Public Communications in 1985. Upon graduation, Henretta was hired by Procter & Gamble as a Brand Assistant for Bold Laundry detergent.

== Career ==
During the next fourteen years, Henretta received several promotions and worked her way up to Vice President of Global Fabric Conditioners and Bleach. One of the products she and her team were instrumental in introducing to the public was the fabric refresher, Febreze. In 1999, Henretta became Vice President of Procter & Gamble’s North American Baby Care division. She was charged with reversing the 10-year decline in sales of P&G’s disposable diapers, Pampers. Henretta and her team re-tooled the quality and images of the brand to one that was more appealing to consumers. They incorporated softer materials for the diapers and obtained licensed Sesame Street characters for the branding. Within two years, the business became profitable and remains a staple consumer product of Procter & Gamble. They also expanded the line to include diapers for other children age groups, such as newborns and toddlers. By 2004, Henretta was promoted to President of Global Baby, Toddler and Adult Care.

Between 2005 and 2012, Henretta headed Procter & Gamble's Asian operations, living in Singapore for seven years. During her tenure, she was challenged with addressing the needs of Asian consumers that encompassed a diverse array of cultural and economic backgrounds. By doing so, she helped expand P&G’s presence in the beauty care products line. While in Asia, Henretta was appointed as a U.S. representative to the Asia-Pacific Economic Cooperation (APEC)’s Business Advisory Council (ABAC). The council meets with government officials to provide business perspectives about the economic climate in the Asian market. In 2011, President Barack Obama appointed Henretta to chair the 21-member ABAC, making her its first woman chairperson. Subsequently, she founded the ABAC Women’s Forum as a networking resource for other women in business.

In 2012, Henretta's mother was diagnosed with Stage 4 cancer and she requested to return to Procter & Gamble's Cincinnati, Ohio headquarters. In August, she became the company's beauty chief. As the senior leadership maneuvered responsibility changes for the eventual succession to A.G. Lafley's CEO post, she was replaced as group president of beauty in 2015 and named global president of e-commerce for P&G. No longer considered a candidate for the CEO position, Henretta retired from Procter & Gamble in June 2015.^{[2]} She used her time to assist her mother until her mother's death in February 2016.

In September 2016, Henretta was featured in a Fortune Magazine article,"Why Top Women Are Disappearing From Corporate America" by Jennifer Reingold, about a pattern of VP-level women progressing toward CEO status and not able to achieve it. The article investigated the high number of executive women who were on Fortune's Most Powerful Women list from 2000 to 2015 and are no longer on the list. In 2016, she joined SSA & Company, a New York-based management consulting firm.^{[2]} She is also a senior adviser for General Assembly, a global education and technology company.^{[1]} Henretta appeared on the list of Fortune's 50 Most Powerful Women in Business for seven consecutive years. In 2010, she was awarded with an honorary PhD in Humane Letters from St. Bonaventure University.

Henretta currently serves on several executive boards, including Staples, Inc., Meritage Home Corp., NiSource, Inc., Corning, Inc., Cincinnati Children’s Hospital Medical Center, St. Bonaventure University, Xavier University, American Eagle Outfitters, Inc., and Meritage Homes Corporation and NiSource, Inc.
