= Lloyd Metzler =

American economist (1913–1980)

Lloyd Appleton Metzler
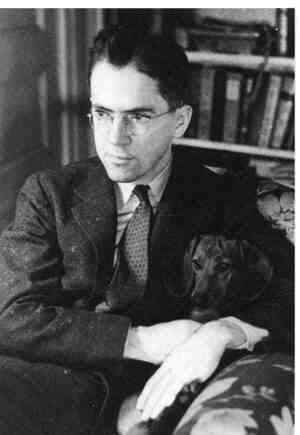
- Born: April 3, 1913; Lost Springs, Kansas, U.S.
- Died: October 26, 1980; Palatine, Illinois, U.S.
- Education: University of Kansas (BS, MBA); Harvard University (MA, PhD)
- Known for: International trade
- Scientific career
- Fields: Economics
- Workplaces: Yale University (1946–47); University of Chicago (1947–1975)
- Doctoral advisor: Alvin Hansen
- Doctoral students: Arnold Harberger

Lloyd Appleton Metzler (3 April 1913 – 26 October 1980) was an American economist best known for his contributions to international trade theory. He was born in Lost Springs, Kansas in 1913. Although most of his career was spent at the University of Chicago, he was not a member of the Chicago school, but rather a Keynesian.

Lloyd was the youngest of three sons of Leroy and Lulu Appleton Metzler, who were both schoolteachers and both had college degrees. All three of the boys attended the University of Kansas at Lawrence. Leroy was a civil engineer, and Donald became the head of the engineering department and served as mayor of Lawrence. Lloyd was heading for a degree and career in business until he fell under the tutelage of John Ise, who convinced him to switch to economics, and who was a lifelong hero.

After graduation, Metzler received his PhD in economics at Harvard University, where he became great friends with Paul Samuelson.

Metzler worked post-World War II with the Office of Strategic Services (OSS) in Washington DC, and spent much of that time working on post-war reconstruction in Europe.

Metzler was awarded a Guggenheim Fellowship in 1942 upon completing his PhD at Harvard. He was made a Distinguished Fellow of the American Economic Association in 1968.

In the early 1950s Metzler's career was severely impacted by the discovery of a brain tumor, and several surgeries. He continued to teach for another 20 years at the University of Chicago.

The Metzler paradox as well as Metzler matrices bear his name.

== Notable students ==
- Arnold C. Harberger - Chief Economic Advisor, USAID; former president of the American Economic Association

== Influences ==
- Alice Bourneuf
- Evsey Domar
- Paul Samuelson

== External Sources ==
- Guide to the Lloyd A. Metzler Papers 1941-1948 at the University of Chicago Special Collections Research Center
