= Al Lerner (disambiguation) =

Alfred Lerner (1933–2002) was an American billionaire and philanthropist, owner of the Cleveland Browns.

Al Lerner may also refer to:

- Al Lerner (composer) (1919-2014), American jazz pianist and composer from the Big Band era
- Alan Jay Lerner (1918–1986), musical theatre lyricist
- Abram Lerner (born 1913), also known as Al Lerner, founder of the Hirshhorn Museum and Sculpture Garden

== See also ==
- Lerner (disambiguation)
