= Ian Dryden =

British photographer (1944–1993)

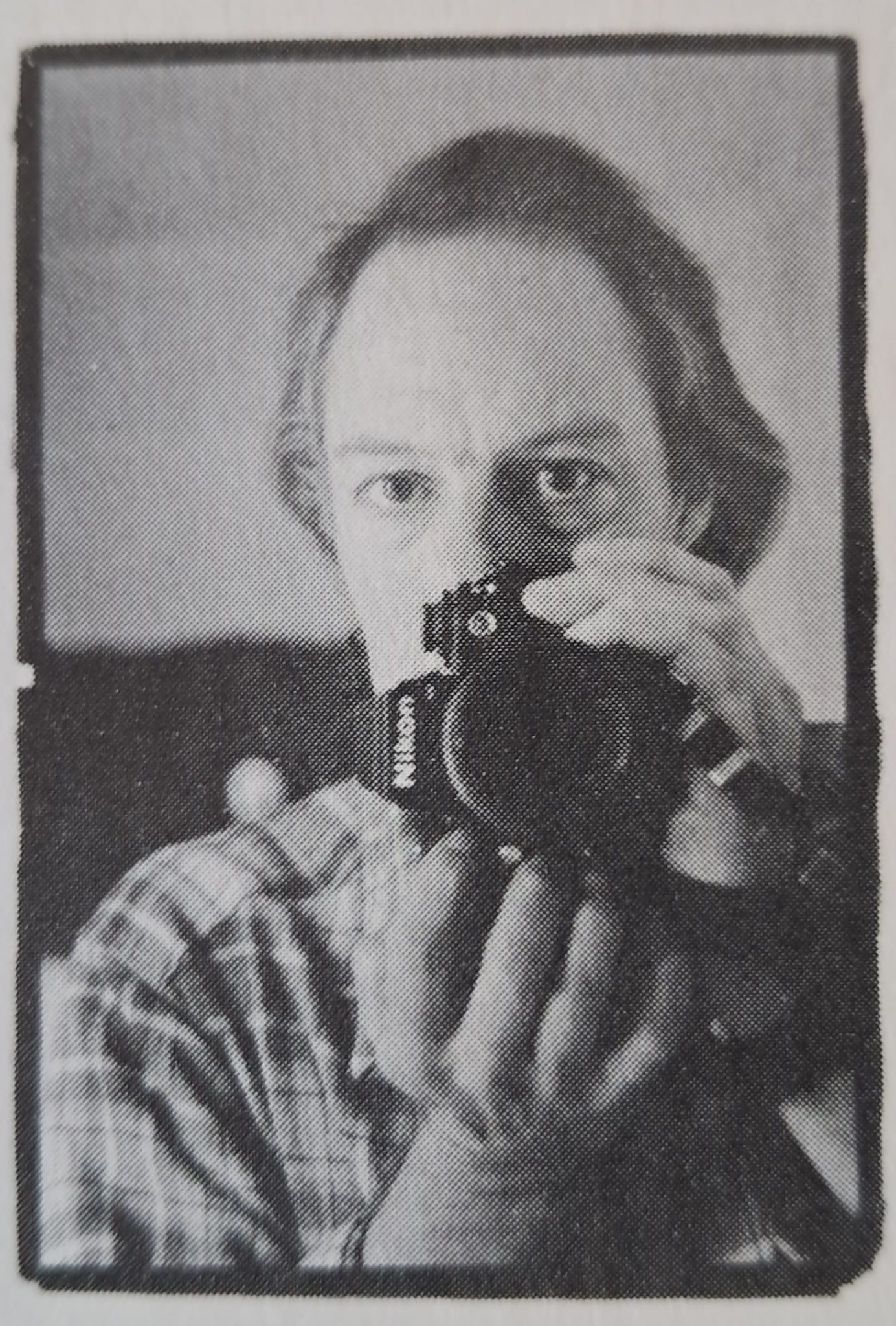
- Born: 29 December 1944; London, England, UK
- Died: 30 May 1993 (aged 48); Cambridgeshire, England
- Citizenship: United Kingdom
- Occupations: Photojournalist and arts photographer
- Years active: 1972-1993
- Spouse: Felicity Anne Russell (m. 1966–1971) Mary Rule (m. 1975–1991)

Ian Dryden (29 December 1944 – 30 May 1993), also known as Ian Dryden Pyle, was a British photojournalist and arts photographer who worked in Edinburgh, California and Mexico prior to his death from lung cancer in 1993 at the age of 48. His work has been exhibited in the United States, Mexico and the United Kingdom.

== Early life & Education ==
Born in London and raised in South Wales, in the early 1960s Ian studied engineering at the University of Edinburgh, where he was enrolled under the name Ian D. Pyle. From 1968-1971, he studied architecture at the Edinburgh College of Art, which was affiliated at the time with Heriot-Watt University.

== Bertrand Russell ==
In 1965, he took a break from university studies and moved to Merionethshire, Wales, where he worked for a year as personal secretary to British philosopher, peace activist and Nobel Laureate Bertrand Russell. On 1 April 1966, in Merionethshire, he married Felicity Anne Russell, the adoptive daughter of Russell's eldest son, John Conrad Lindsay, 4th Earl Russell. After their marriage, Ian and Anne left Wales and lived together in Edinburgh from August 1966 until separation prior to their divorce in 1971.

== Edinburgh ==
Given his first camera at the age of 10, Dryden was an avid amateur photographer until 1972, when he turned to photography professionally in Edinburgh, working as a freelance photographer there until 1975. "As a photographer to the Lindsay Kemp Mime Troup and other emerging theatre groups" in Edinburgh, Ian photographed Kemp productions of "Flowers" and "Salomé" at the Traverse Theatre. During the city's second theatre fringe festival in 1973 he produced what a reviewer for the Guardian newspaper deemed "a beautiful film" that was shown as part of an evening tribute to avant garde music composer Eric Satie. Early published photographs also included a portrait of the artistic-bohemian community of St. Stephen Street, where he lived, appearing in the Edinburgh Evening News in 1973. In 1973, Dryden was given the first individual exhibition of his work by the Scottish Arts Council in Edinburgh, with a show titled "Man to Mankind". Dryden also travelled and worked in the Far East, including Bangladesh and Afghanistan as well as on the European continent, where in 1975 he met and photographed the Irish novelist and playwright Samuel Beckett in Paris.

In Edinburgh, Dryden met Mary Rule, an American-born aspiring model and stage actress, who after undergraduate studies at the University of London and the University of Bath was studying Shakespearean drama as a graduate student from 1972-74 at the University of Edinburgh. The couple moved to California in 1975 and were married in San Diego, California, on 22 November 1975. Following their marriage, Rule took the name Mary Dryden both as her married name and stage name thereafter.

== California ==
From 1975 to 1977, Ian worked as a freelance photographer, regularly contributing photographs to the weekly San Diego Reader newspaper. The quality of his work for the Reader attracted the attention of the photo editor at the daily San Diego Union-Tribune newspapers, which hired him as a staff photographer in late-1977, a position he held until mid-1983.

In 1983, Dryden left the Union-Tribune and moved to Los Angeles to work as a staff photographer for The Los Angeles Times, then one of the leading daily newspapers in the United States. After three years with the Times, he went to Mexico City on assignment for the newspaper in August 1986 to take photographs accompanying a story about ongoing relief efforts for the 1985 Mexico City earthquake. Following that assignment, he returned to Los Angeles and by year-end resigned his staff position in order to relocate to Mexico City.

In addition to his photo-journalism work, Dryden also served during his years in California as company photographer for the San Diego Dance Theater, the L.A. Actors Theater Center and the San Quentin Drama Workshop.

== Mexico ==
Over the next six years, Dryden lived and worked mainly from Mexico City, accredited as a correspondent for the Gamma-Liaison photo agency and regularly free-lancing work to the Los Angeles Times, The San Diego Union and other print media that included the New York Daily News, the Sacramento Bee, Arizona Daily Star (Tucson) and National Post (Toronto). During 1987-88, he travelled to India and based in Trivandrum spent nine months travelling and photographing people and places.

Living in downtown Mexico City, Dryden associated with and photographed the work of members of a group of Mexican and foreign-born artists then transforming Mexico's art scene, including Belgian-born artist Francis Alÿs, British-born Melanie Smith , Texas-born painter Thomas Glassford, Mexican painter and performance artist Eloy Tarcisio and performance artist Elvira Santamaría, Dryden's partner during the last year of his life.

Interviewed by Canadian arts journalist Jennifer Morton, Ian was identified in Belong, Morton's subsequent book on emerging art scenes worldwide, as "a British ex-pat photojournalist who feels he is a refugee from his past. He's now a conceptual artist." In the book, Morton quotes Dryden as saying, apparently in reference to Mexico's contemporary art milieu of the time, that "We are living in the last bohemia. Bohemia implies living outside the laws of society, living without money, living as you want in defiance of society."

== Exhibitions ==
Individual exhibitions:

1973, Man to Mankind, Scottish Arts Council, Edinburgh.

1981, Prisoners, Gallery Graphic, San Diego, CA, USA.

1990, Wandering Eye: The Photography of Ian Dryden in Mexico, Instituto Anglo-Mexicano de Cultura, Toluca, Mexico.

1992, Vista Cansada, Estudio Eloy Tarcisio, Calle Licenciado Verdad 11, Centro Histórico, Mexico City.

Group exhibitions:

1973, Photography Into Art, Camden Arts Centre, London.

1988, Iconografía de la anticipación, Centro Cultural Santo Domingo, Centro Histórico, Mexico City (curated by Guillermo Santamarina).

1991, ACCIÓN ReACCIÓN: Tres artistas británicos (with artists Melanie Smith and Pete Smith), Galeria Ramon Alva de la Canal, Universidad Veracruzana, Xalapa, Veracruz / Instituto Veracruzano de la Cultura, Veracruz, Mexico.

1993, Vetlemitas: una instalación, Ex-Teresa Arte Actual, Centro Histórico, Mexico City (posthumous joint exhibition/installation with photographers Adrián Bodek, Gabriel Figueroa Flores & María Inés Roque, with performance by Elvira Santamaría, curated by Lorena Wolffer).

== Death ==
Ian Dryden died of metastatic lung cancer on 30 May 1993, in Cambridgeshire, England. His remains were cremated on 7 June 1993, and following a funeral and memorial service among family and friends his ashes were scattered in the River Leith in Edinburgh.
