= Sesame Street licensing =

List of companies and products with official Sesame Street licensing

The American children's television series Sesame Street is known for its extensive merchandising. Licensees include a variety of companies which manufacture books, magazines, video/audio media, and toys using the characters and themes of Sesame Street.

== Current licensees ==
Current licensees include Fisher-Price, Nakajima USA, Build-A-Bear Workshop (Build-An-Elmo, Build-A-Cookie Monster, And Build-A-Big Bird), Hasbro (Sesame Street Monopoly), Wooly Willy, Betty Crocker (Elmo Fruit Snacks), C&D Visionary (air fresheners), General Mills (Sesame Street Cereal) and Children's Apparel Network. Former licences include Applause, Child Dimension, Gibson Greetings, Gorham Fine China, Ideal Toys, Milton Bradley Company, Nintendo, Palisades Toys, Questor, Radio Shack, Tyco, and the Western Publishing Company. Creative Wonders (a partnership between ABC and Electronic Arts) produced Sesame Street software for the Macintosh, since at least 1995 and on the PC since 1996; Atari produced Sesame Street games in 1983. Before going bankrupt, Palisades Toys was to release a line of deluxe series action figures, for adults, as part of Sesame Workshop's push to expand into retro products for teens and adults.

The Sesame Beginnings line, launched in mid-2005, consists of apparel, health and body, home, and seasonal products. The products in this line are designed to accentuate the natural interactivity between infants and their parents. Most of the line is exclusive to a family of Canadian retailers that includes Loblaws, Fortinos, and Zehrs.

Monarch Store in Australia launched cloth nappies and accessories along with "bootysuits" which are sleep suits that accommodate cloth nappies as a licensee in March 2022

== Proceeds ==
As Sesame Workshop, the licensor of these characters, is a non-profit organization, a percentage of the money from any Sesame Workshop product goes to help fund Sesame Street or its international co-productions.

== Toys ==
=== Tickle Me Elmo ===
Tickle Me Elmo was one of the fastest selling toys of the 1996 season. That product line was and still is one of the most successful products Mattel has ever launched. Both it and its most notable successor, TMX, have caused in-store fights. Elmo starred in a Christmas special that year, in which he wished every day of the year was Christmas.

=== Recalls ===
After Fisher-Price recalled a large number of Sesame Street brand toys (among multiple licenses) in 2007, Sesame Workshop announced that they would independently inspect the products of all manufacturers. It went so far as to threaten withdrawing entirely from toy licensing, if it were not satisfied with the manufacturer's guarantees.

== Books ==
Its fiction books are published on five continents, primarily by Random House in North America. Over 18 million Sesame Street books and magazines were purchased in 2005. The books/products/publications mention that the book(s)/product(s)/publication(s) was "created in cooperation with the Children's Television Workshop the producers of Sesame Street" (stated as first sentence in the disclaimer). Then they mention that children do not need to watch the television show to benefit from the books/products/publications (stated as second sentence). However, Workshop revenues from the books/products/publications and it will be used to help support CTW educational projects (stated as third and final sentence). This is shown on the disclaimer (which is usually seen on the back cover of most books).

The disclaimer states it this way:

"This educational book/product was created in cooperation with the Children's Television Workshop, producers of Sesame Street. Children do not have to watch the television show to benefit from this book/product. Workshop revenues from this book/product will be used to help support CTW educational projects".

== Live performances ==
=== Ice shows ===
In 1975, the ice-skating show Sesame Street on Ice presented costumed actors and dancers as touring casts, each cast performing a unique-multimillion-dollar budget ice show. Sesame Street on Ice ran from 1975 to 1980.

=== Stage shows ===
The live touring show Sesame Street Live presents costumed actors and dancers as characters from the series. In recent years, VEE has had four touring casts. Each season, the tours reach 160 different cities across North America, reaching 2 million people annually. Since the first production of Sesame Street Live (on September 17, 1980), 48 million children and their parents have seen the show performed around the world.

== Theme park ==
United Parks & Resorts is the licence holder for Sesame Street in its U.S. amusement parks including a completely Sesame Street themed park, Sesame Place, in Langhorne, Pennsylvania, United States. BEC also has a stage show at SeaWorld Orlando Elmo and the Bookaneers. In 2009 Busch Entertainment's Busch Gardens Williamsburg in Williamsburg, Virginia opened "Sesame Street Forest of Fun" with plans to open "Sesame Street Safari of Fun" at its Busch Gardens Tampa Bay park in Tampa Florida in the 2010 operating season.

Another theme park, Parque Plaza Sésamo, exists in Monterrey, Mexico, and Universal Studios Japan includes a three-dimensional movie based on the show.

== Non-educational products ==
Although Sesame Street characters occasionally endorse non-educational products, they rarely appear in their puppet form, to limit the suggestion to children that the characters are formally endorsing the product. The Muppets do appear in puppet form to endorse select causes. Big Bird has promoted safe seating practices and the wearing of seatbelts, for the Ford Motor Company, while Grover promoted a new course on children's informal learning, created by Harvard University with Sesame Workshop. Elmo has appeared before the US Education Appropriations Subcommittee to urge more spending on music in schools.

== International merchandising ==
Barrio Sésamo, Plaza Sésamo, Sesamstraße, Sesame English and Sesamstraat have all had merchandise of their local characters. Shalom Sesame videos and books have also been released.

In 2004, Copyright Promotions Licensing Group (CPLG) became Sesame Workshop's licensing representative for The Benelux, adding to their United Kingdom representation.
