= Philip Kaufman's unrealized projects =

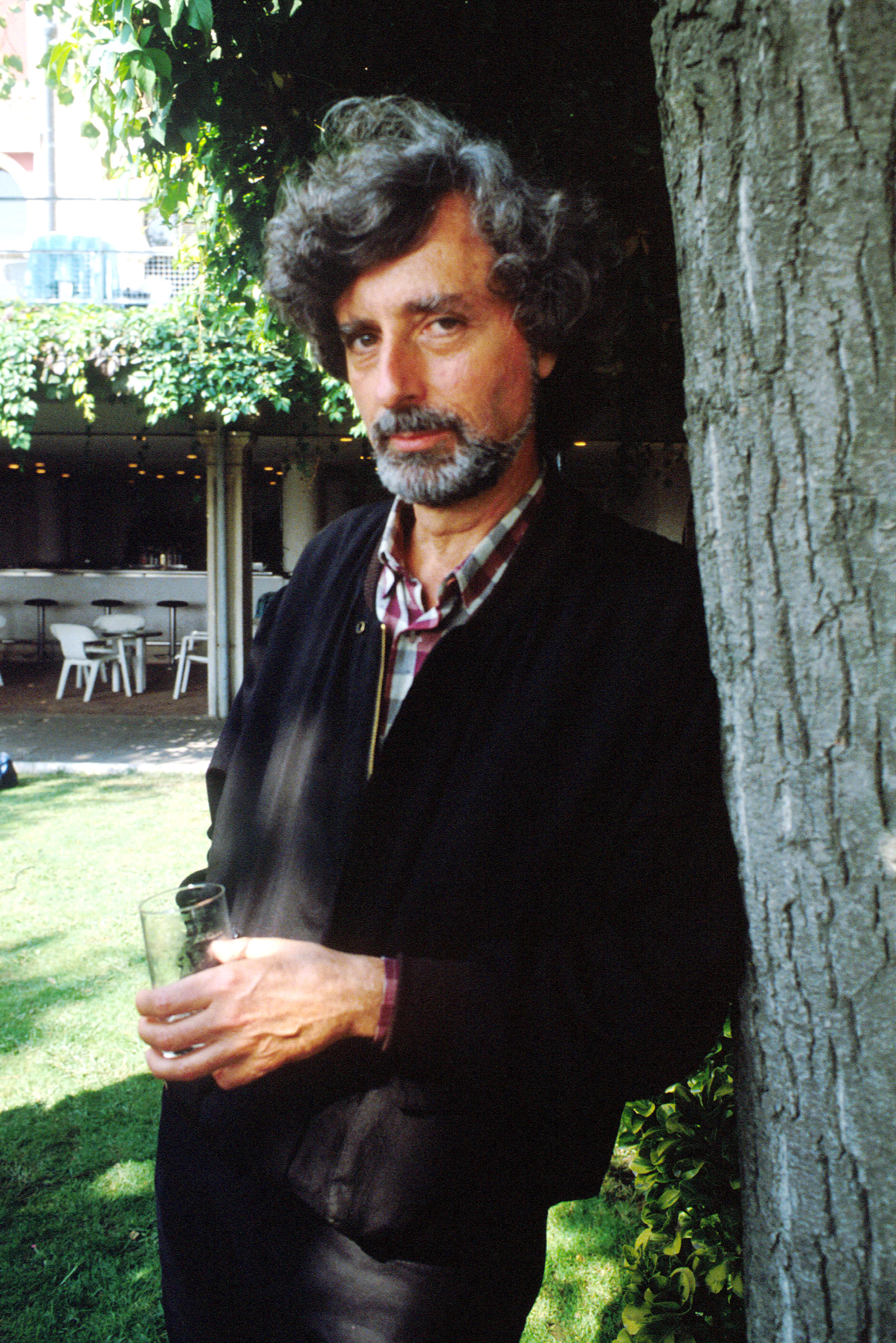
Kaufman attending the 1991 Venice Film Festival

During his long career, American film director Philip Kaufman has worked on a number of projects which never progressed beyond the pre-production stage under his direction. Some of these projects fell in "development hell" or were officially cancelled, while others were taken over and completed by other filmmakers.

== 1970s ==
=== The Outlaw Josey Wales ===
Kaufman had initially been attached to direct The Outlaw Josey Wales, and had adapted the novel for the screen with the aiding of Sonia Chernus and an uncredited Michael Cimino. While he had wanted to stay as close to the source novel as possible, Kaufman was less happy with its fascistic political stance and felt that element of the script needed to be severely toned down. The film's star and financer, Clint Eastwood disagreed with this change, "And it was his film," Kaufman said. Principal photography officially commenced on October 6, 1975, in Lake Powell and near Paria, Utah. Eastwood immediately disagreed with Kaufman's directing method, who insisted on filming with a meticulous attention to detail. One day, Kaufman insisted on finding a beer can as a prop to be used in a scene. While he was absent, Eastwood ordered cinematographer Bruce Surtees to quickly shoot the scene and leave, before Kaufman returned. On October 24, Kaufman was fired at Eastwood's command by producer Robert Daley. From then on, the film was directed by Eastwood himself with Daley as the second-in-command.

=== Raiders of the Lost Ark ===
Kaufman was initially set to direct Raiders of the Lost Ark, after conceiving the story with George Lucas in the mid-70s. However, Kaufman postponed the project to work on The Outlaw Josey Wales. In 1977, Lucas invited Steven Spielberg to accompany him on vacation in Hawaii, where he then offered him the position to direct. Spielberg accepted and the film was made in 1981.

=== Star Trek: Planet of the Titans ===
In 1976, Kaufman was signed to direct Star Trek: Planet of the Titans, after several other filmmakers were approached. The plot would have seen the crew of the USS Enterprise investigating the homeworld of the mythical alien race of the Titans. In escaping through a black hole, they're hurled into the prehistoric past where they teach early man how to make fire, similar to the alien influence on human ancestors seen in 2001: A Space Odyssey. The film would have also explored the concept of the third eye, and was later compared to the appearance of the Greek Gods in the original series episode "Who Mourns for Adonais?". After Chris Bryant and Allan Scott's script draft was rejected, they both quit, and Kaufman tried to rewrite the story, with the resulting treatment heavily inspired by the Olaf Stapledon sci-fi novels Last and First Men and Star Maker. He later described this version as being "less 'cult-ish' and more of an adult movie, dealing with sexuality and wonders rather than oddness." He intended this version to feature Spock facing off against a main Klingon enemy, intended by Kaufman to be played by Japanese actor Toshiro Mifune. Kaufman explained that it would have featured the two undergoing a psychedelic experience, and summed it up by saying, "I'm sure the fans would have been upset, but I felt it could really open up a new type of science fiction." The project was eventually killed on May 8, 1977, some two weeks before the release of Star Wars. Various reasons have been cited for the cancellation, including a regime change at Paramount, and that executives thought they had missed their window due to the imminent release of Star Wars, believing science fiction fans would not pay to see two such films.

== 1980s ==
=== Jimgrim vs. the Nine Unknown ===
In 1983, Kaufman and producer Stephen J. Roth announced plans for a film based on the novels of Talbot Mundy, to be called Jimgrim vs. the Nine Unknown. The project was shelved after the financers, Tri-Star, pulled out allegedly on account of the lukewarm box office reception of Kaufman's The Right Stuff.

== 1990s ==
=== The Cheese Stands Alone ===
In March 1991, Kaufman was hired to direct Kathy McWorter's spec script The Cheese Stands Alone for Scott Rudin at Paramount, though he allegedly left the project after one week due to fundamental disagreements with McWorter. The script is a comedy set in present-day Chicago that follows a 35-year-old Hungarian Gypsy virgin who meets a strong young woman that turns his life upside down.

=== Legalese ===
In June 1995, Kaufman made a development pact with New Line Cinema to direct the comedy Legalese. Kaufman later dropped out due to "slowdowns in casting."

=== The Alienist ===
In August 1995, Kaufman signed on to adapt, direct and executive produce The Alienist for Paramount Pictures and Scott Rudin, based upon the 1994 period novel by Caleb Carr. David Henry Hwang and Stephen Katz also worked on the script. A budget of $50 million was sought out. Kaufman worked for two years on the film, and even got as far as location scouting and hiring storyboard artists. "It had very dark material," Kaufman said. "But when I set out on it, I said to Sherry Lansing at Paramount, 'Are you really going to do a story about a boy whore who is killed?' And she looked me in the eye and said, 'You bet we are.' We worked on the script, the locations, everything. Two years – no exaggeration. It was ready to go when the studio said, 'Well, no, perhaps we're not'." An estimated amount of $1.5–2 million was spent just developing the film.

=== The Intruder ===
In February 1997, after his adaptation of The Alienist stalled at Paramount, Kaufman made a deal to develop the adaptation of Peter Blauner's The Intruder for Mandalay Entertainment as his next directing project. The film was slated for production in New York for late Summer or early Spring.

=== The Good Shepherd ===
In March 1997, after Francis Ford Coppola and Wayne Wang left the production of The Good Shepherd, screenwriter Eric Roth selected Kaufman to direct the film. The two worked together on the project for a year, adapting the script into a nonlinear structure, going backwards and forwards in time. Kaufman, who believed this change would "give it a more contemporary feeling," helped give the story a more cohesive context, providing subtext for the characters' motivations. However, the new studio head halted production due to his lack of interest in making a spy film that fell outside of the action genre. From that point, the project was taken to MGM where it languished in development hell for several years before eventually being directed by Robert De Niro in 2006.

=== Namor: Sub-Mariner ===
In April 1997, Kaufman was in negotiations with Marvel Studios to direct a film based on their comic book character Namor, entitled Namor: Sub-Mariner. Kaufman was developing the film the next month when he revealed it would tackle environmental issues by depicting Namor as having "bad feelings" towards the land residents of Earth over ecological concerns.

=== The Runaway Jury ===
In February 1998, it was reported that Kaufman would replace Joel Schumacher as director on the adaptation of John Grisham's The Runaway Jury, with the start date planned for summer. This project, along with The Alienist, was one of many during this period which "were absolutely going to be made", before having the plug abruptly pulled on them.

=== Untitled Liberace biopic ===
In August 1998, Robin Williams signed on to play concert pianist Liberace in an untitled biopic to have been directed by Kaufman. The film was written by screenwriting duo Jason Friedberg and Aaron Seltzer, and was slated to begin production in the Fall of 2000. However, in the December 2000/January 2001 issue of Venice Magazine, Kaufman stated that they were still working on getting the script right.

=== Johnny Stompanato ===
In May 1999, Kaufman was announced to direct David and Janet Peoples' script of Johnny Stompanato, about the tumultuous relationship between gangster Johnny Stompanato and actress Lana Turner. The film was budgeted at $30 million and was to be produced by Martin Elfand. Richard Gere was attached to star.

== 2000s ==
=== Untitled Mezz Mezzrow biopic ===
In the early 2000s, Kaufman had apparently tried to direct a film from a script by Cecil Brown about 1930s jazz musician and drug dealer Mezz Mezzrow.

=== Henderson the Rain King ===
Kaufman also stated around this time that he was working on an adaptation of Saul Bellow's Henderson the Rain King, and that Jack Nicholson had shown interest in playing the titular eccentric millionaire who embarks on a spiritual quest to Africa. As of 2001, the project was still being developed, with no studio officially involved.

=== Killer Spy ===
In July 2001, Kaufman was reported to direct the long-in-development biopic about rogue CIA agent Aldrich Ames adapted from the book by Peter Maas. Screenwriter Henry Bromell was in talks to rewrite the film's script, with previous drafts having already been done by Stephen Rivele and Christopher Wilkinson, and John Logan.

=== Prison Fish ===
On August 21, 2001, Variety reported that Kaufman signed on to direct a film titled Prison Fish, for Phoenix Pictures. Jerry Stahl was in talks to write the script, based on a forthcoming memoir You Got Nothing Coming: Notes from a Prison Fish by Jimmy Lerner. Kaufman expected the tone of Stahl's script to be both gritty and funny; "His stuff is really amusing, in the tradition of Lenny Bruce."

=== Daniel Deronda ===
Variety also indicated that Kaufman was at the same time developing an adaptation of George Eliot's 1876 eight-part novel Daniel Deronda at Fox Searchlight. Kaufman himself mentioned his interest in adapting Daniel Deronda in a 2004 interview, describing it as a "big adventure story".

=== Suspicion remake ===
On August 22, 2001, Variety reported that Kaufman would additionally direct a remake of Alfred Hitchcock's Suspicion for Dimension Films and RKO from a script by playwright John Guare.

=== Perfect Stranger ===
In November 2001, Kaufman was attached to develop and direct the psychological thriller Perfect Stranger for Revolution Studios. At this stage, Kaufman had been eying Julia Roberts to play the lead and screenwriter Frank Renzulli was in talks to rewrite Jon Bokenkamp's original premise. The film was eventually made by director James Foley in 2007, starring Halle Berry and Bruce Willis.

=== Untitled Louis Armstrong biopic ===
Kaufman had also apparently worked on a drama based on the life of Louis Armstrong backed by Max Palevsky.

=== I Was Interrupted ===
In January 2006, Kaufman signed on to direct I Was Interrupted, a biopic about Nicholas Ray from a script by Oren Moverman. It was to have been adapted from Ray's memoir of the same name and chronicle the last decade of the late director's life. No start date was reported for the film.

=== Challenger ===
In May 2006, Kaufman was attached to direct Challenger starring David Strathairn as world-famous scientist Richard Feynman. Written by Nicole Perlman, the project was described as an investigative drama "in the vein of The Insider" that examined the role Feynman played in the probe of the Challenger shuttle explosion.

== 2010s ==
=== Change of Heart ===
In February 2010, Kaufman was involved to direct a comedy called Change of Heart for Paul Schiff Productions, with Ben Stiller attached to star. The logline read: "One half of a lesbian couple trying to have a baby via artificial insemination hooks up with her last boyfriend in order to get pregnant." Its status was listed as "in development" but no further updates emerged.

=== Untitled period drama series ===
In November 2014, Kaufman said he wanted to do more work in television and that he had just finished writing something for actor Clive Owen. The following month, Kaufman revealed the project to be a period drama "along the lines of Deadwood" that would have been set up as a miniseries or a limited-run series.
