= Larner =

Larner is a surname. Notable people with the surname include:

- Benjamin Coyle-Larner (born 1994), British rapper
- Christina Larner (1933–1983), British historian
- Edgar Larner (1869–1930), British electrical engineer and inventor
- Elizabeth Larner (1932–2022), British actress and a singer with a powerful soprano voice
- George Larner (1875–1949), British athlete who competed mainly in the 10 mile walk
- Gerald Larner (1936–2018), British music critic
- Gorman DeFreest Larner, awarded the Distinguished Service Cross, First Lieutenant (Air Service), U.S. Army, for heroism in 1918
- Jeremy Larner (1937–2026), American author, poet, journalist and speechwriter
- Jesse Larner (born 1963), New York-based writer on politics and culture

== See also ==
- Larner-Johnson Valve, a mechanism used in dams and water pumping to control the flow of water through large water pipes
