= 1980s austerity policy in Romania =

Economic policy in Communist Romania

In the 1980s, severe austerity measures were imposed in the Socialist Republic of Romania by President Nicolae Ceaușescu in order to pay off the external debt incurred by the state in the 1970s. Beginning in 1981, the austerity led to economic stagnation that continued all throughout the 1980s, a "sui generis shock therapy" which lowered the competitiveness of the Romanian economy and decreased the amount of exports.

Although the measure helped pay off the debt, the harsh austerity measures negatively affected the living standards of Romanians, increased shortages and contributed to the collapse of the Romanian Communist Party through the Romanian Revolution in December 1989, which culminated in the execution of Nicolae Ceaușescu.

== Background ==
Between 1950 and 1975, Romania's economy grew at one of the fastest rates in the world and in the 1960s and early 1970s, Ceaușescu was considered one of the "enlightened" Eastern European leaders. Through his domestic policies, he tried in the late 1960s to get the support of the people, as he increased wages, reformed the pension system and encouraged consumption by decreasing the prices of consumer goods. The infant mortality rate plummeted from 139 per 1,000 during the interwar period to 35 in the 1970's. During the interwar period half the population was illiterate but under the communist government illiteracy was eradicated. The population became urbanized, women's rights greatly improved, life expectancy grew, among many other achievements.

However, as the economy continued to grow in the 1970s, much of the growth was achieved through investment in heavy industry (34.1% of the GDP in the 1971–1975 five-year plan) rather than consumption. Some industries, such as petrochemicals and steel, had a production capacity higher than demand in the local and the available external markets, resulting in underused capacities. Overall, the economy suffered from the combination of productive and inefficient units, as well as the falsification of statistics and large inventories of unsold production.

The Romanian economy had a strong bias toward large enterprises: 87% of all industrial workers and 85% of industrial output were in enterprises having more than 1,000 employees, leading to a lack of flexibility of the economy.

The growth was, according to Daniel Dăianu, a case of immiserizing growth, as the industrialization and increased ties with market economies were rushed with a weak functional basis, by ignoring the market mechanisms. This kind of growth limited the potential of increasing the exports, and the hard currency for repaying the loans was obtained through cuts in the imports.

== International loans ==
Early in the 1970s, Western countries were willing to fund Romania's acquisition of technology through loans given on political considerations. Romania's debt to Western creditors rose from just $1.2 billion in 1971 to a peak of $13 billion in 1982. The 1970s energy crisis, combined with the increase in interest rates, and in the context of sluggish growth and the severe global recession of 1974, made Romania incapable of repaying its debts.

In 1981, in order to pay its due debts, Romania requested a line of credit from the International Monetary Fund and adopted a policy of paying back all its debt. The decision to repay the debt has been considered irrational, as other developing countries that were hit by the same problem were able to obtain debt rescheduling or "haircuts".

As recommended to Romania by the IMF, imports were reduced and exports were increased. The effect of the cuts in imports in Romania, a net importer of food from the West, was however not correctly estimated by the foreign analysts, and led to food shortages.

Romania's record - having all of its debts to commercial banks paid off in full - has not been matched by any other heavily-indebted country in the world. The policy to repay - and, in multiple cases, prepay - Romania's external debt became the dominant policy in the late 1980s. The result was economic stagnation throughout the 1980s and - towards the end of the decade - the conditions were created for an economic crisis. The country's industrial capacity was eroded as equipment grew obsolete, energy intensity increased, and the standard of living deteriorated significantly. Draconian restrictions were imposed on household energy use to ensure an adequate supply for the industry. Convertible currency exports were promoted at all costs and imports were severely compressed. In 1988, real GDP contracted by 0.5%, mostly due to a decline in industrial output caused by significantly increased material costs. Despite the 1988 decline, the net foreign balance reached its decade peak (9.5% of GDP). In 1989, GDP slumped by a further 5.8% due to growing shortages and increasingly obsolete capital stock. By March 1989, virtually all of the external debt had been repaid. The entire medium- and long-term external debt was repaid. The lingering amount, totalling less than $500 million, consisted of short-term credits (mainly short-term export credits granted by Romania). A 1989 decree legally prohibited Romanian entities from contracting external debt. The CIA World Factbook edition of 1990 listed Romania's external debt as "none" as of mid-1989.

=== Yearly evolution (in billions of dollars) ===
- 1995 was the last year in which Romania's economy was dominated by the state. From 1996 onwards, the private sector would account for most of Romania's GDP.
- Data for 1975, 1980 and 1982-1988 taken from the Statistical Abstract of the United States.
- Data for 1989-1995 provided by the OECD.
- Data for 1981 and 1985 provided by the World Book Year Book.
- By April 1989, with its debt virtually zero, Romania was a net external creditor. Foreign borrowing was resumed after December 1989. In order to maintain net creditor status, Romania had to keep its external debt under $2.5 billion, the low estimate of the amount it was owed by oil producers and other LDCs. This was first achieved in 1988 and continued through the early 1990s.

	1975	1980	1981	1982	1983	1984	1985	1986	1987	1988	1989	1990	1991	1992	1993	1994	1995
Gross external debt	2.9	9.4	10.2	9.8	8.8	7.1	6.6	6.4	5.1	2.2	0.0	0.2	2.2	3.5	4.5	5.5	6.7
Net status	debtor	debtor	debtor	debtor	debtor	debtor	debtor	debtor	debtor	creditor	creditor	creditor	creditor	debtor	debtor	debtor	debtor

== Austerity policy ==
Ceaușescu started an austerity program without reforming Romania's centralised and inflexible planning. Domestic energy resources were channelled towards the inefficient production of goods intended to be exported. Even basic necessities, such as food, heating, electricity and medical care, were rationed, and infrastructure was left to decay. Due to the austerity programme, by 1983, the standard of living had fallen by 19-40 percent, according to IMF figures.

=== Inflation and lowering of real incomes ===
Starting in 1978, the government began increasing the prices of goods and services that had been stable until then: included in the first wave of price increases were food, services, public transportation, clothing, wood and wood products. In 1979, a second wave of price increases began, for energy: prices for petrol, natural gas and electricity were increased.

Throughout 1982, prices were increased again; initially, the plan was to have just one large increase in basic goods, but eventually, the decision taken was to increase prices gradually, for all products. Just for the year 1982, the increase reached 35%. Not only was energy usage restricted, but its price was increased as well: electricity was raised by 30% and natural gas by 150%.

On October 7/8, 1982, the Central Committee approved a law on the participation of workers in the investment fund of state-owned companies. Through this act, the workers were given the "right" (in practice, it was mandatory) to invest their money and become, theoretically, co-owners of the company. In practice, it meant a reduction in wages for workers, with part of their earnings given to company investment funds.

In December 1982, a new reform of the salaries system was introduced: part of the wages were to be paid to the workers only if the company achieved its goals. This part was initially 24% and later increased to 27%. The goals were often not achieved, so de facto this meant a decrease in wages.

Real incomes began to shrink not only due to inflation, but also due to the lack of availability of certain products, while the flourishing black market priced out most people.

=== Government cuts ===
According to Vlad Georgescu, the state appeared to have given up its social functions, as social spending declined throughout the 1980s. Between 1980 and 1985, cuts were made by the state in its housing expenditure (37%), healthcare (17%) and education, culture and science (53%), according to data provided to the Comecon.

The healthcare cuts led to an increase in infant mortality rates (one of the highest in Europe) and high AIDS prevalence, the disease being transmitted through the reuse of hypodermic needles in hospitals.

A referendum on the military was held on 23 November 1986 to reduce the size of the army and to cut military spending by 5%.

The cuts did not affect the building of the People's House, a massive administrative building in the new Bucharest Civic Centre.

=== Food shortages ===
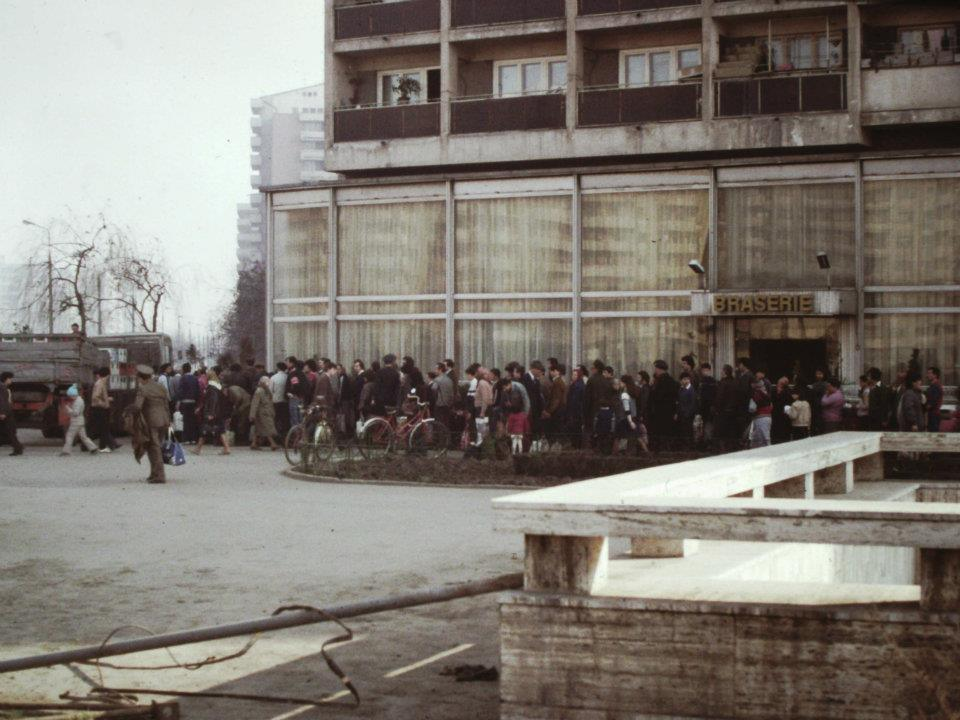
A queue for cooking oil, Bucharest, 1986

Romania's agriculture had been ignored as the government focused on industrialisation: the highly inefficient agriculture sector employed more than 30% of the working force, but received little and mismanaged investment. Despite this, Romania's agriculture still lacked sufficient labour, the state solving the issue by taking each year millions of school children and university students (2.5 million in 1981, 2 million in 1982) to contribute to the harvest or whatever work was needed in the fields.

Romania began to suffer chronic food shortages and despite the attempts of the government to solve the problem, it persisted throughout the 1980s. Beginning in 1983, the collective farms and individual peasants had to deliver produce to the state (something that had been previously abolished in 1956) and, when selling their products in farmers' markets, they had to adhere to strictly enforced price ceilings.

In 1981, a rationing system for basic foodstuffs was started for bread, milk, cooking oil, sugar, and meat. Rationing of some foodstuffs, such as bread, flour, sugar and milk, was only outside the capital, Bucharest being excepted from it. At Ceaușescu's initiative, a "Rational Eating Programme" began, being a "scientific plan" for limiting the calorie intake for the Romanians, claiming that the Romanians were eating too much. It tried to reduce the calorie intake by 9-15 percent to 2,800-3,000 calories per day. In December 1983, a new dietary programme for 1984 set even lower allowances.

=== Energy usage ===
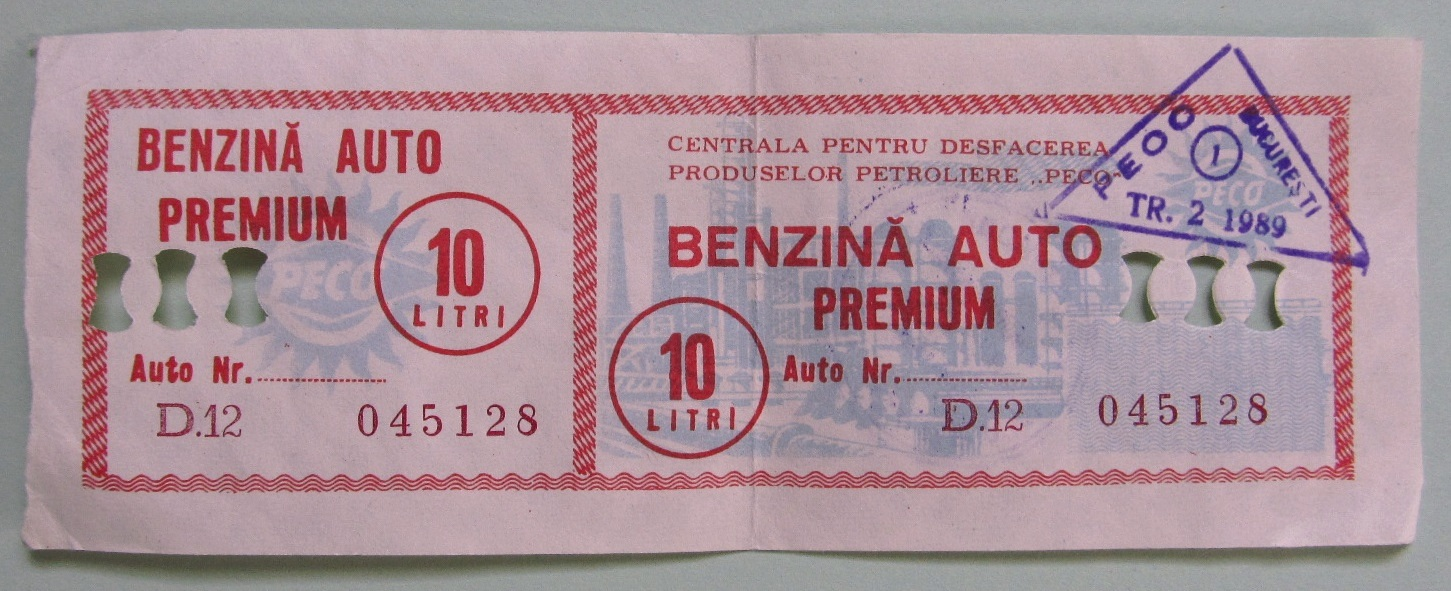
Gasoline coupon from the 1980s

Electricity and district heating were often stopped in order to save energy, leading to unbearable winters. Availability of hot water was also restricted to one day per week in most apartments. Unannounced power cuts affected even hospitals' regular functioning: for instance, in the winter of 1983, dozens of babies in neonatal intensive care units died due to the power cuts to the incubators. Street lighting was generally reduced to a bare minimum, and often turned off.

Petrol was rationed; private car owners were allowed to buy only 30 litres (7.9 US gallons) of petrol per month and private driving bans were regularly imposed. In order to save fuel, the media even appealed to peasants to replace mechanical work with manual work, using carts and horses instead of trucks and tractors.

In 1985, Ceaușescu shut down all regional radio stations and limited television to a single channel broadcasting only two to three hours a day, in both cases to conserve energy.

== 1989 revolution ==
The economic austerity, along with political repression, were the main reasons behind the protests and revolution of 1989. His politics isolated him not only from the people, but also from the party (as seen by the Letter of the Six in March 1989) and the military.

== See also ==
- Nicolae Ceaușescu's cult of personality
- Economy of the Socialist Republic of Romania
