= Nationalization in Romania =

The nationalization of the means of production was a measure taken by Romania's new Communist authorities in order to lay the foundation of socialism. The act that allowed this measure to take place was Law 119, adopted by the Great National Assembly on June 11, 1948. Article 1 decreed subject to nationalization "all the wealth of the soil not in the property of the state at the time of entry into force of the Constitution of the Romanian People's Republic, as well as individual enterprises, societies of any type and private industrial, bank, insurance, mining, transport and telecommunications associations". Nationalized (generally without any form of compensation) were 8,894 industrial, mining, transport, banking and insurance companies, followed in November 1948 by 383 cinemas and medical-sanitary facilities. By 1950, the measure was applied to chemical enterprises, pharmacies and remaining economic entities.

The nationalization also included a significant number of homes. The figure of around 400,000 buildings is regularly mentioned. According to Societatea Academică din România (SAR) between 241,000 and 600,000 properties were affected by the measure.

The nationalization begun in 1948, together with the collectivization of agriculture (1949–62), were decisive in undoing the capitalist economy and establishing a socialist economy based on state-owned or cooperative property.

After the fall of communism in Romania, the state has tried to compensate homeowners and enterprise owners who could not recover their houses, industries, or lands. A special fund dedicated to compensation was created in 2005: Fondul Proprietatea.

== See also ==
- Economy of the Socialist Republic of Romania
- Nationalization
- SovRom

== Notes and references ==
- Stoica, Stan (coordinator). Dicţionar de Istorie a României, p. 233-4. Bucharest: Editura Merona, 2007.
- Other references:
