= Economy of the Socialist Republic of Romania =

Economy of Socialist Republic of Romania
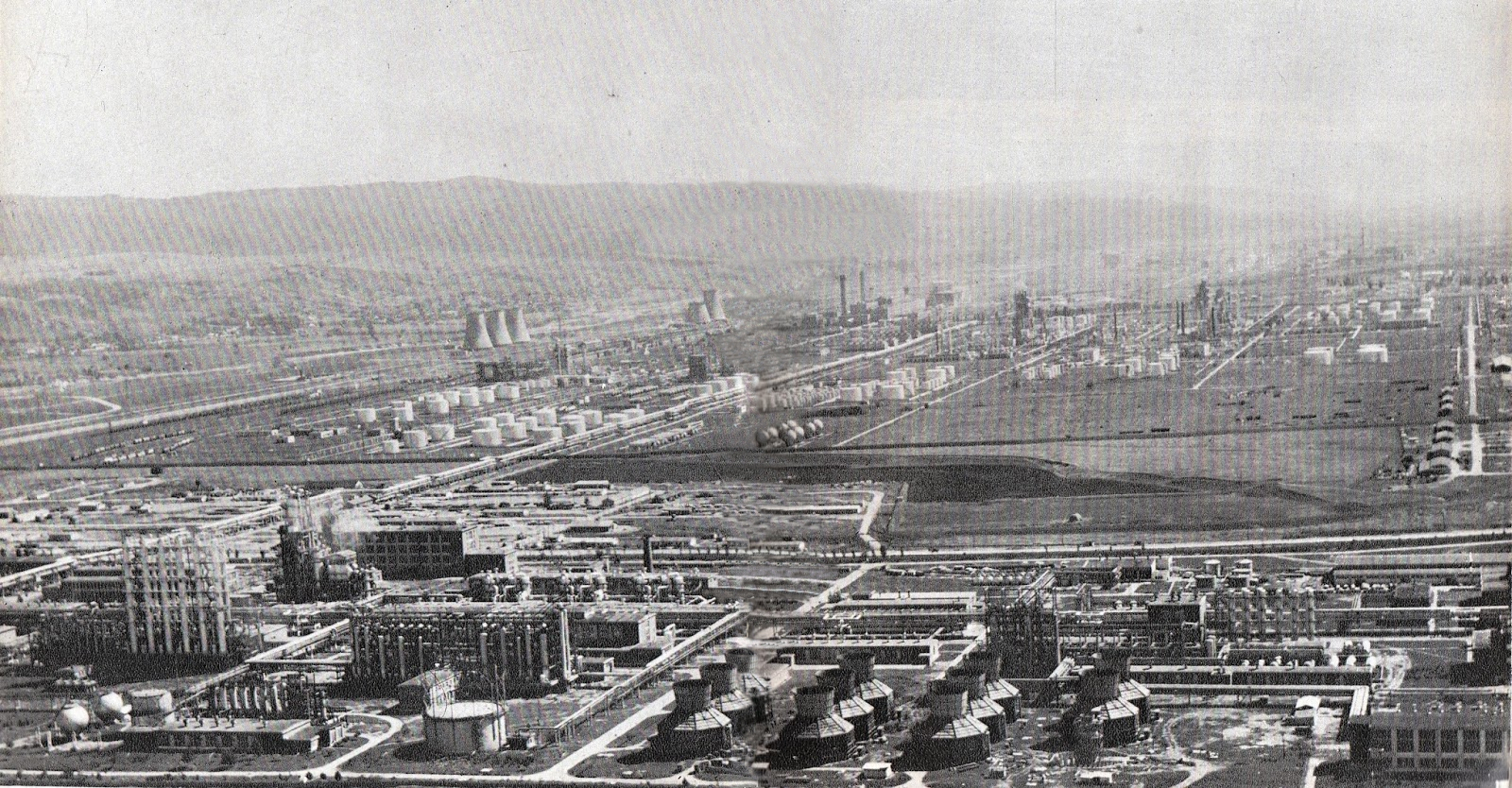
- Borzești Petrochemical Plant
- Currency: Leu (ROL)
- Fiscal year: Calendar year
- Trade organisations: Comecon, WTO

Statistics
- GDP: $180 billion
- GDP rank: 40th

External
- Main export partners: Soviet Union
- All values, unless otherwise stated, are in US dollars.

The economy of the Socialist Republic of Romania was centrally planned, similar to the Economy of the Soviet Union. Most of the means of production (including all large and medium enterprises) were owned by the state, which established production plans as part of the Five-Year Plans.

The economy grew between the 1950s and 1970s at one of the fastest rates in the world, changing Romania from a predominantly agricultural country into an industrialized country. Almost 30% of the population moved during this period from rural to urban areas to work in the newly built factories.

During the 1980s, dictator Nicolae Ceaușescu pursued an austerity policy in order to pay foreign debts, leading to a decade-long stagnation and negatively affecting the living standards of the Romanians.

== Pre-Socialist Romania ==
Interwar Romania was one of the least developed countries in Europe, having a per capita income of less than half the one of Czechoslovakia.

Despite having mineral resources and a state interventionist policy, Romania was not able to change the agricultural character of its economy into an industrial one. 80% of its population was employed in labor-intensive agriculture, which made up 64% of Romania's exports, while only 2% of its exports consisted of manufactured goods. Its industrial and economic development, as well as its relationship with the industrialised West was typical of what we call now the periphery countries.

Despite the land reforms, Romania's peasants continued to live at the edge of poverty. Its bourgeoisie used much of the country's economic surplus into non-productive uses, while the country had an oversized and corrupt state apparatus, upon which relied a privileged minority.

== Early years ==
Early post-war development was not slow. The country had been affected by the war and, furthermore, it was burdened by war reparations to the Soviet Union, either directly or through joint Soviet-Romanian companies (SovRoms). Additionally, 1945 and 1946 saw a severe drought which strongly reduced agricultural output.

The lack of organization post-war (much of it due to the political struggle and the agitation among the workers), together with a foreign exchange crisis (which led to shortage of materials and spare parts) meant lower industrial production. An improvement came in late 1947 as the better harvest and a monetary reform helped the economy.

Romanian gross production (1945–1948)
	1945	1946	1947	1948
Natural gas (million cubic ft.)	1304	1332	1176	1260
Coal (thousands of tons)	—	2012	2268	2400
Iron ore (thousands of tons)	141	112	121	209
Pig iron (thousands of tons)	54	66	90	191
Steel (thousands of tons)	118	148	183	341
Tractors	—	—	340	1000

=== Nationalization and collectivization ===
After the Communists were able to liquidate their allies, the reforms were passed at a faster pace. In June 1948, the Great National Assembly passed a nationalization law which resulted in the nationalization of virtually all of Romania's industrial means of production. Together with the nationalization, central planning was introduced, first using one-year-plans (in 1949 and 1950), then using five-year plans (starting in 1951).

In the countryside, all large holdings were nationalized in March 1949, being either converted into state-owned farms or handed over to collective farms. The small farmers were encouraged to join these collective farms, but the brutality with which this program was implemented led to resistance which was, occasionally, even violent. According to a 1961 report given to Gheorghe Gheorghiu-Dej, around 80,000 peasants were arrested, of which around 30,000 were prosecuted.

However, Romania did not have the material means (such as tractors), nor the skilled people to run large-scale exploitations. The Central Committee admitted the mistakes and retreated temporarily, allowing individual property, with mandatory quotas of the production. The pressure from these quotas, combined to the attractiveness of industrial jobs in the cities led to a decline of agriculture's share of the labor force from 74.1% in 1950 to 69.5% in 1955. It was only in 1958 that a new campaign begun: the number of households engaged in private agriculture went down from 88.5% in 1955 to around 7% in 1962, when the socialization of agriculture was considered complete.

=== Industrialization ===
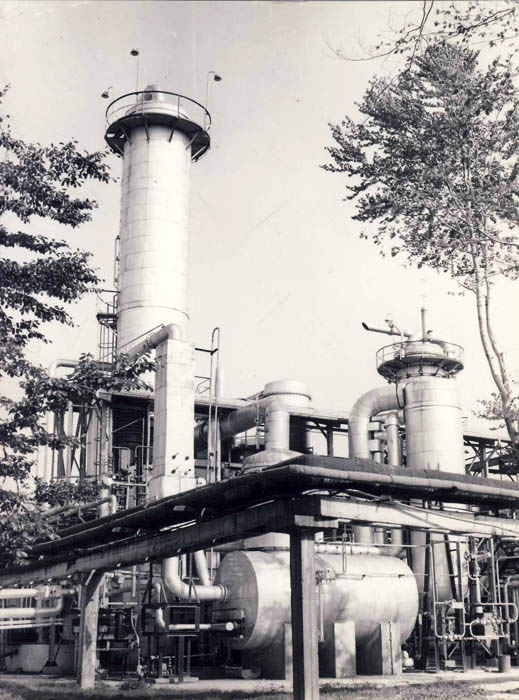
The formaldehyde production facility at the chemical plant of Victoria, Brașov. The chemical industry was one of the focuses in the government's industrialization plans

A large investment plan was started: between 1950 and 1953, the ratio of investment to national income grew from 19% to 34%. It focused on industrialization, which received 48% of the investment funds, as well as construction. Most of the investment was in electrification, metallurgy, machine building and chemical industries. However, few investments were made in the countryside (less than 10%).

In 1953, the pace of industrialization was slowed, more resources being redirected to consumption and housing. Retail sales were increased and steps were made to end rationing in order to gain the favors of the working class. The second five-year plan (1956–1960) was supposed to accelerate the pace of industrialization again, but, in the context of the Hungarian Revolution of 1956, the Romanian Communist Party cautiously reduced the investment to half of the original amount and, instead, increased the workers' wages by 15%. After the leadership was sure that they had the control in the country, the government resumed its policy of industrialization, growing investment by 10.92% in 1958 and 16.23% in 1959.

Over this period, industrialization proceeded at a faster rate than any other Eastern European country. The labor force increased from 12% to 19.2% between 1950 and 1965 and, according to official figures, its industrial production increased by 649%. While the real figures are expected to have been lower, most sources agree that there was a massive growth.

The industrialization had an important social impact. The cities grew as new jobs were created in factories, but the inhabitants of these urban areas suffered overcrowding and lack of services, as not enough funds were allocated to building housing. The high level investment in industry meant that, although consumption increased in absolute terms, it was the lowest among the Eastern Bloc countries.

== Drive towards national autonomy ==
Following the consolidation of power of Nikita Khrushchev in 1957, he began to press for economic coordination and reforms in the Eastern Bloc. The Romanian leadership under Gheorghiu-Dej disagreed with this course and preferred to continue the Stalinist-style investments in industry rather than the moderate approach to industrialization supported by the Communist Party of the Soviet Union.

Romania was able to have a relatively independent economic policy thanks to the context, which included the death of Stalin, Romania success in keeping stability internally and its role in restoring order in Hungary after the Hungarian Revolution of 1956, as well as the Sino-Soviet split.

Romania's foreign trade
Year	Soviet Union		Western countries	
Year	Imports	Exports	Imports	Exports
1958	57.7%	50.2%	21.5%	24.9%
1964	37.7%	39.8%	39.8%	32.8%

The Soviet Union showed dissatisfaction with Romania's investment in heavy industry; symbolically it did not provide any assistance in the building of the massive Galați steel works. The Romanian Communist Party used this resistance in its propaganda to rally popular support, by portraying development as a national goal.

Since Romania could no longer rely on the Soviet economic assistance, the government began establishing trade relations with the capitalist West. The result was that the proportion of trade with the Soviet Union decreased, while trade with Western countries grew. By 1965, the West may have accounted as much as half of Romania's imports of equipment and machinery.

== See also ==
- Electronics industry in the Socialist Republic of Romania
