= Wolf Adelsohn =

Russian Hebrew scholar and educator

- Born: Grand Duchy of Lithuania
- Died: 13 August 1866; Odessa, Kherson Governorate, Russian Empire
- Writing career
- Literary movement: Haskalah

Ze'ev Wolf Adelsohn (Hebrew: זאב וולף אַדֶלסון; died 13 August 1866) was a Russian Hebrew scholar and educator.

== Biography ==
Wolf Adelsohn was born in Lithuania around the beginning of the 19th century. Little is known about his parentage. Adelsohn studied under Rabbi Manasseh ben Porath. While still a young man, he secured a teaching position in the residence of Lippe Ettinger in Brest-Litovsk.

In 1833, he relocated to Dubno, where he exercised significant influence over the emerging cohort of Maskilim, while facing hostility from the Ḥasidim due to his rationalist perspectives. Later, he spent two years as an instructor in the household of Leon Chari in Meseritz before moving to Odessa. In Odessa, he grappled with financial hardship, and died in extreme poverty from starvation.

Notable among Adelsohn's students were the grammarian Ḥayyim Ẓebi Lerner and the Russian censor Vladimir Feodorov (né Ẓevi Hirsch Grünberg). Due to his philosophical character and disregard for conventional norms, he earned the epithet "Diogenes" within the Maskilic community. He composed a critical treatise on the Book of Esther, countering the viewpoints of Isaac Samuel Reggio. He also authored essays on Hebrew literature, which were acquired after his death by L. Chari and Joel Baer Falkovich.
