= Michael Lerner =

Michael or Mike Lerner may refer to:

== Film ==
- Michael Lerner (actor) (1941–2023), American actor
- Michael Alan Lerner, French-American screenwriter, director, and journalist
- Mike Lerner (filmmaker), documentary filmmaker

== Music ==
- Michael Benjamin Lerner (born 1986), American musician who performs as Telekinesis
- Mike Lerner (musician) (born 1981), American metal guitarist

== Other people ==
- I. Michael Lerner (1910–1977), geneticist and evolutionary biologist
- Michael Lerner (angler) (1890–1978), American angler and businessman
- Michael Lerner (rabbi) (1943–2024), American writer and social justice activist
- Michael Lerner (health activist) (born 1940s), American health activist and founder of Commonweal research institute
- Michael R. Lerner, dermatologist

== See also ==
- Michael Learned (born 1939), American actress
