= Lerner paradox =

Economical paradox

In economics, the Lerner paradox is the theoretical possibility that imposing tariffs raises the world price of the import good, causing a deterioration of the tariff-imposing country's terms of trade. Abba Lerner showed the possibility in his 1936 article.

== Conditions ==
In the large country case of a perfectly competitive market, imposing tariffs reduces the world price of the import good, improving the tariff-imposing country's terms of trade. However, under certain conditions, tariffs can have an opposite effect. Therefore, it is called a paradox.

- According to Gene Grossman, a Lerner paradox occurs when the government spends most of its tariff revenue to purchase the import good.
- According to Pan-Long Tsai, a Lerner paradox occurs when the elasticity of the tariff-imposing country's import demand function is smaller than the government's spending share of its tariff revenue on the import good.
- Regarding the effect of tariffs on terms of trade, there is another paradox called the Metzler paradox. Koichi Hamada and Masahiro Endoh employ a general equilibrium model with multiple goods to demonstrate the conditions that both a Lerner paradox and a Metzler paradox do not occur. There is a study building a model with quality and markups to explain both Lerner paradox and Metzler paradox within a single framework.
- Abba Lerner's 1936 article, demonstrating the possibility of a Lerner paradox, also shows the Lerner symmetry theorem.

== See also ==
- International trade theory
- Tariffs
- Lerner symmetry theorem
- Metzler paradox
- List of paradoxes
