= The Laboratory of Art and Ideas at Belmar =

Coordinates: 39°42′32″N 105°04′41″W

The Laboratory of Art and Ideas at Belmar was a contemporary art institution located in Lakewood, a suburb on the western boundary of Denver, Colorado. Founded by Executive Director Adam Lerner, The Lab at Belmar was a 104-acre (0.42 km^{2}) mixed-use residential and commercial urban neighborhood located in Lakewood. Operating in a storefront in Belmar since May 2004, The Lab opened in a dedicated space at Belmar in fall 2006. In March 2009 The Lab merged with MCA Denver (Museum of Contemporary Art Denver), and Adam Lerner became Director of MCA Denver. In May 2009 the Belmar location was closed and its programming was integrated into MCA Denver.

== History ==
An institution dedicated to art and thought, combining elements of museum, think tank, and public forum, The Lab at Belmar was conceived as a space for the public to engage with artists and scholars, and to advance discussion of and experimentation with issues related to contemporary culture. Programs at The Lab included exhibitions and several lecture series, music performances, and other public programs.

In fall 2006 The Lab launched its full program in an 11,500-square-foot (1,070 m^{2}) space adjacent to Belmar's central open-air Plaza. Architect Hagy Belzberg of Belzberg Architects of Santa Monica, California was selected to design The Lab's new home. In keeping with The Lab's dual role as gallery and community space, Belzberg adapted the building to allow for a range of visitor experiences.

The Lab at Belmar began as a collaboration between Continuum Partners, the developers of Belmar, and the Denver Art Museum, where Adam Lerner was formerly Master Teacher for Modern and Contemporary Art. Lerner and Lewis Sharp, Director of the Denver Art Museum, worked together to develop The Lab as a center for experimental programming. The Lab was guided by an advisory committee of scholars, museum professionals, and artists.

== Exhibitions ==
In fall 2006 The Lab launched its exhibitions program with Fantôme Afrique, a three-screen film installation by British artist Isaac Julien. This was the work's United States debut. The Lab was one of three institutions to commission the work, along with the Pompidou Center in Paris and the Ellipse Foundation in Portugal. Julien is Britain's preeminent black filmmaker, as well as an artist, writer, and scholar known for exploring the relationship between history and visual pleasure.

Shot in Africa, Fantôme Afrique incorporates archival footage from early colonial expeditions and African political history. Inspired by French author André Gide’s 1925 expedition to Africa with his filmmaker companion Marc Allégret, the film presents dance, architecture and the cinematic milieu itself to explore the creative possibilities that emerge at the point of interaction between local and global culture.

In spring 2007 Liam Gillick organized an exhibition and design an environment featuring a selection of films and videos made by Americans documenting their personal stories. Gillick collaborated with professional folklorists and ethnographers to produce and exhibit a range of material which included home movies, oral histories, video testimonials or other forms of amateur and professional documentation of individual stories.

== Programs ==
The Lab’s public lecture series fostered interactive experiences that explore contemporary art and culture.

“Mixed Taste: Tag Team Lectures on Unrelated Topics” brought together topics and ideas that are typically found in separate fields. The lecture series paired, for example, the Curator of African Art at the Denver Art Museum with a wholesale sake distributor, and a professional film critic with a bird store owner.

The “School of Music Reform” was an experimental performance and discussion program designed to connect the general public with music. Each program focused on a single composer and performer and included a presentation of a piece of music followed by performances that offered new forms or variations of the original work. A magician, preacher, barber shop quartet, and other guest performers were brought in to help relate concepts such as rhythm, repetition, and improvisation. Topics included the music of Charles Mingus, Philip Glass, Terry Riley, Laurie Anderson, Frank Zappa, and Björk.

“Mishugas! Appreciating Contemporary Art and Things You Learn From Aunt Miriam” was a didactic lecture series led by Adam Lerner and inspired by videotaped interviews with his aunt, Miriam Edelman. The series combined slides with lectures to introduce audiences to contemporary art and the history of ideas.

The Lab also hosted a series of classes and workshops teaching specific craft skills by the Denver chapter of the Church of Craft. These workshops created a gathering place for people to engage with local artists and craft professionals on projects.
