= Romania and the International Monetary Fund =

The Romania–IMF relations span for more than 40 years, during which Romania had two economic systems: Soviet-type economic planning of the 1970s and 1980s and capitalism since the 1990s. The IMF had a strong role in shaping the Romanian economy of the 1990s towards neoliberalism.

== Socialist Republic of Romania ==
=== Joining the IMF ===
Informal and exploratory discussions between Romania and the IMF began in 1968, but it was only on 21 September 1972 that the IMF announced that Romania applied for membership. Romania was formally accepted on 5 December 1972, following a vote on the IMF's board of directors, becoming a member on 15 December 1972. While Romania was not the first socialist country to become a member (Yugoslavia, Czechoslovak Socialist Republic, Polish People's Republic, and Democratic Republic of Yemen had been members for some time), it was the third member of the Comecon to join. In order to become a member, Romania agreed to grant a scrutiny of its economic situation (including holdings of gold and international monetary reserves, international trade, balance of payments and domestic budget), a thing that other socialist states were reluctant to grant.

=== 1981 agreement ===
Due to worsening trade deficit (in part due to the rise of the price of oil) and the rise of interest rates, in 1981 Romania had difficulties paying the debts it owed to Western banks, estimated at the end of 1981 at $11.4 billion.

On 15 June 1981 it was announced that Romania will get a $1.5 billion in loans from the IMF at an interest rate between 6.25% and 13.5%, to be repaid over 3 to 7 years. Part of the loan was from IMF's own money and part was from money that the IMF borrowed, the latter being at a higher interest rate. At that time, Romania already owed $280 million to the IMF and the additional loan was needed to help Romania pay the interest it owed to the private banks.

In order to be granted the loan, Romania agreed to raise food and gasoline prices and reduce spending (see 1980s austerity policy in Romania) and to provide additional information about its economy to the fund. It also agreed to reduce the pace of industrialization and to increase investment in agriculture. These demands were similar to the demands made by the Soviet Union during the early 1960s, which then led to a nationalist and dissident attitude of Romania.

Romania borrowed in 1981 from the IMF a sum of $400 million out of the $1.5 billion line of credit, but in November 1981, the IMF had cut off further financing because Romania failed to meet economic performance targets.

In January 1982, Romania and the banks reached an agreement of deferment. IMF announced that it was negotiating a new agreement with Romania and that they'd give additional loans in return for implementing economic reforms. The IMF was involved in the negotiations between the Romanian government and 200 Western banks regarding the rescheduling of the debt.

The Romanian authorities began a very tough austerity program, which gained the approval of IMF, releasing the second tranche of the loan on 24 June 1982. Following negotiations, the Paris Club agreed to delay 80% of the arrears due for 1981 and 1982 and the IMF released the last tranche in December 1982.

=== Paying off the debts ===
On 16 December 1982, at the National Conference of the Romanian Communist Party, President Nicolae Ceaușescu announced a new policy of paying off all of Romania's external debt, a policy continued throughout the 1980s.

In 1987, Ceaușescu entered an open conflict with the IMF after he stopped the communication of basic economic data to the IMF and a year later he banned contracting new loans from the IMF, announcing that Romania gave up on Western financing forever.

Romania made the last payment in 1989, a few months before the Romanian Revolution. According to Mugur Isărescu, Ceaușescu wanted to take the country out of the IMF, but he did not act out of the fear that he might lose the gold deposited at the organization.

== Gradual liberalization: 1991–1996 ==
After the Revolution, Romania had no debt and some reserves, which were quickly depleted. By September 1990, the Romanian government began talks with the IMF, seeking a line of credit. Romania signed an agreement with the IMF in March 1991, getting $1 billion in aid on the condition of beginning free market reforms, including abolishing foreign exchange restrictions.

Removing the restrictions on prices led to a 250% inflation. The IMF identified the monetary surplus, rather than the economic depression, as the main priority for the government and the government tried to limit as much as possible the spending, having a budget surplus in 1991. This program led to a crisis which affected much of the economy, leading to the impossibility for companies to pay their suppliers (arrears reached 40% of the companies' turnover).

The government broke the terms of the agreement in order to prevent a collapse of the entire economy, forcing the National Bank to take over debts from state-owned companies. The IMF canceled the stand-by agreement and recommended the National Bank to force the companies' to pay their credits before maturation, thereby neutralizing much of the effects of the government's program. This led to the collapse of a third of the nation's industry and the destruction of nearly one million jobs.

Another agreement was signed in November 1991, Romania getting $300 million in IMF loans and $200 million in other loans. In exchange for this loans, Romania agreed to take austerity measures resulting in higher food and fuel prices.

The National Bank soon took over completely the neoliberal policies of the IMF and argued for a complete free market for the state-owned enterprises. The state-owned banks also took over this ideology and gave only short-term loans at large interest rates to state-own enterprises, despite the Văcăroiu government's attempts to pressure them to lower interest rates. The IMF also demanded raising the prices of energy to international levels despite the fact that Romanian energy was cheaper to produce. Due to these divergences, both the 1993 and the 1995 agreements with the IMF failed, the Fund arguing that the state violated the independence of the central bank by demanding lower interest rates.

== Neoliberal reforms: 1996–2000 ==
In the Romanian general election, 1996, the former communists lost power, being replaced by the liberal Romanian Democratic Convention who began a shock therapy. The reform package made by the IMF and the Romanian government included a massive reduction of subsidies and loans given to state-owned enterprises, refraining from intervening to prop up the exchange rate of the leu, closing down all state-owned companies that were not profitable, privatizing the state-owned banks, financing the deficit exclusively from the market (sovereign debt). The government privatized around 40% of the industry for a meagre sum of $2.1 billion and closed down much of the rest.

== 2009 agreement ==
While in January 2009, President Traian Băsescu said that the last thing Romania would do would be to sign an agreement with the IMF, his tone softened to agree an IMF monitorization (but without any conditions put on by the IMF) and eventually, Prime Minister Emil Boc signed the new agreement in June 2009, Boc arguing that the loan will be taken exclusively by the National Bank of Romania to consolidate its reserves.

The IMF and EU agreement gave Romania a 20 billion € line of credit of which the National Bank of Romania and the Romanian government took 17.9 billion € and which should be gradually returned by 2023, giving a total average interest of 15% (2.74 billion €).

== List of agreements ==
Start	End	Value (XDR)	Reference
3 October 1975	2 October 1976	95 million	
9 September 1977	8 September 1978	64.1 million	
15 June 1981	14 January 1984	817.5 million (of 1102.5 million)	
11 April 1991		318.1 million (of 380.5 million)	
29 May 1992		261.7 million (of 314 million)	
11 May 1994		94.3 million (of 320.5 million)	
22 April 1997		120.6 million (of 301.5 million)	
5 August 1999		139.75 million	
31 October 2001	15 October 2003	300 million	
7 July 2004	6 July 2006	0 (of 250 million)	
4 May 2009		10569 million (of 11443 million)	
31 March 2011		0 (of 3090.6 million)	
27 September 2013		0 (of 1750 million)	

== Bibliography ==
- Adam Burakovski (2011). Dictatura lui Nicolae Ceaușescu, 1965-1989 – Geniul Carpaților. Polirom. ISBN 978-973-46-1963-4.
- Cornel Ban (2015). Dependentă și dezvoltare: Economia politică a capitalismului românesc. Tact Cluj-Napoca. ISBN 978-606-84-3743-9.
