= Adam Lerner =

American art curator

Adam Lerner is the JoAnn McGrath Executive Director/CEO of Palm Springs Art Museum, a position he assumed in July 2021. In this capacity, he oversees the museum's permanent collection of over 12,000 art objects including the Architecture and Design Center, Edwards Harris Pavilion, and Frey House II. Formerly, he was the Director of the Museum of Contemporary Art Denver and Chief Animator in the Department of Fabrications. He was the founder and Executive Director of The Laboratory of Art and Ideas at Belmar until The Lab merged with the MCA Denver in March 2009.

== Career ==
Lerner was previously Master Teacher for Modern and Contemporary Art at the Denver Art Museum from 2001 to 2003. Prior to his arrival in Colorado, Lerner served as Curator of the Contemporary Museum, Baltimore, where he curated several exhibitions, including new projects with Christian Marclay and Dennis Adams, and was the originating curator for the film installation Baltimore by Isaac Julien.

== Museum Public Programming ==
Lerner is known for a unique approach to museum programming that combines elements of curatorial and educational practice. Lerner’s approach is best exemplified by a program that he developed at The Lab at Belmar in 2004 Mixed Taste: Tag-Team Lectures on Unrelated Topics, which brings together randomly paired topics in the same night. In 2009, he brought the popular program to the Museum of Contemporary Art Denver, where it is produced by Sarah Kate Baie, the museum’s Director of Programing and Chief of Fictions, and presented weekly in the summer and winter seasons. Lerner has also presented Mixed Taste at public events and conferences hosted by the American Craft Council, Deitch Studio, in Long Island City, the Museum of Fine Arts, Boston, and the Museum of Modern Art, New York.

Lerner and Baie also worked with artist Melanie Smith (artist) and Rafael Ortega to develop a version of Mixed Taste called Huevos Revueltos for the Sala de Arte Público Siqueros, Mexico City.

In an article on Lerner in Surface Magazine, Aric Chen described one of his public events as follows:

"A collision of highbrow and low, it presents odd-couple, head-to-head pairings between, say, a tequila connoisseur and an expert on dark energy in the Universe that tease out disparate approaches to knowledge with geeky brilliance."

This style has precursors in the Dada art movement and is often compared with Cabinet Magazine and Machine Project, in Los Angeles.

== Exhibitions ==
For MCA Denver, Lerner co-curated (with Elissa Auther) the major group exhibition West of Center: Art and the Counterculture Experiment in America, 1965–1977, traveling to the Scottsdale Museum of Contemporary Art, the Jordan Schnitzer Museum of Art, at the University of Oregon, Eugene, and Mills College Art Museum, Oakland, California. To accompany the exhibition, the curators co-edited a major publication, published by the University of Minnesota Press.

Lerner has also curated for MCA Denver such unconventional exhibitions as Orphan Paintings: Unauthenticated Art of the Russian Avant-Garde, which presented a collection of unauthenticated paintings to explore the meaning of authenticity in art.

At The Lab at Belmar, Lerner curated solo exhibitions of Liam Gillick and Issac Julien as well as such non-traditional exhibitions as The Astounding Problem of Andrew Novick, featuring the obsessive collections of a former punk rock singer turned electrical engineer.

At the Contemporary Museum, Baltimore, Lerner curated several exhibitions, including new projects with Christian Marclay and Dennis Adams, and was the originating curator for the film installation Baltimore by Isaac Julien.

== Recognition ==
Nina Simon, one of the leading voices of museum reform in the United States, wrote in her blog, Museum 2.0, that under Lerner’s leadership MCA Denver “is a small, focused fount of creative expression and ingenuity."

Lerner innovative work at The Lab at Belmar was the subject of an extensive discussion in the Canadian national bestseller The Geography of Hope: A Tour of the World We Need (Random House Canada, 2007), where Chris Turner wrote that “Lerner assembled the funkiest, most playful, most inviting arts and culture program suburbia had ever seen.”

== Academic Focus ==
Since the early 1990s, Lerner’s scholarship has focused on the relationship between art and public life. Lerner co-edited the book "Reimagining the Nation," published by Open University Press (1993), including his own essay on nineteenth-century sculpture and French nationalism. He wrote his dissertation on early twentieth-century American monuments, emphasizing the career of Gutzon Borglum, the sculptor of Mount Rushmore. His contribution to the Corcoran Gallery of Art’s 2002-03 biennial exhibition catalogue “The Museum and the Multiplex” was the subject of a symposium of the same name at the Corcoran in spring 2003.

== Education ==
Lerner received his Ph.D. from the Johns Hopkins University and his Master's from Cambridge University. He was a Fellow at the Smithsonian American Art Museum from 1997 to 1998.

== Books ==
- Mark Mothersbaugh: Myopia, Princeton Architectural Press, 2014. (ISBN 978-1616892623)
- From Russia With Doubt, Princeton Architectural Press, 2013. (ISBN 978-1616891626)

== See also ==
- Adam Lerner in America
- MCA Denver
