= Children's Apparel Network =

American children's clothing company

The Children's Apparel Network is an American company whose products include department and specialty store layette, newborn and infant apparel. In 2005, they licensed the Sesame Beginnings brand for some products. Children's Apparel Network is located in Manhattan at 31 West 34th Street, Floor 11 New York, NY 10001.
