= SovRom =

1945–1956 type of economic enterprise in Romania

The SovRoms (plural of SovRom) were economic enterprises established in Romania following the communist takeover at the end of World War II, in place until 1954–1956 (when they were dissolved by the Romanian authorities).

In theory, SovRoms were joint Romanian-Soviet ventures aimed at generating revenue for reconstruction, and were created on a half-share basis in respect to the two states; however, they were mainly designed as a means to ensure resources for the Soviet side, and generally contributed to draining Romania's resources (in addition to the war reparations demanded by the armistice convention of 1944 and the Paris Peace Treaties, which had been set at 300 million United States dollars—see Romania during World War II). The Soviet contribution in creating the SovRoms lay mostly in reselling leftover German equipment to Romania, which was systematically overvalued.

== History ==
=== Creation, structure, and effects ===
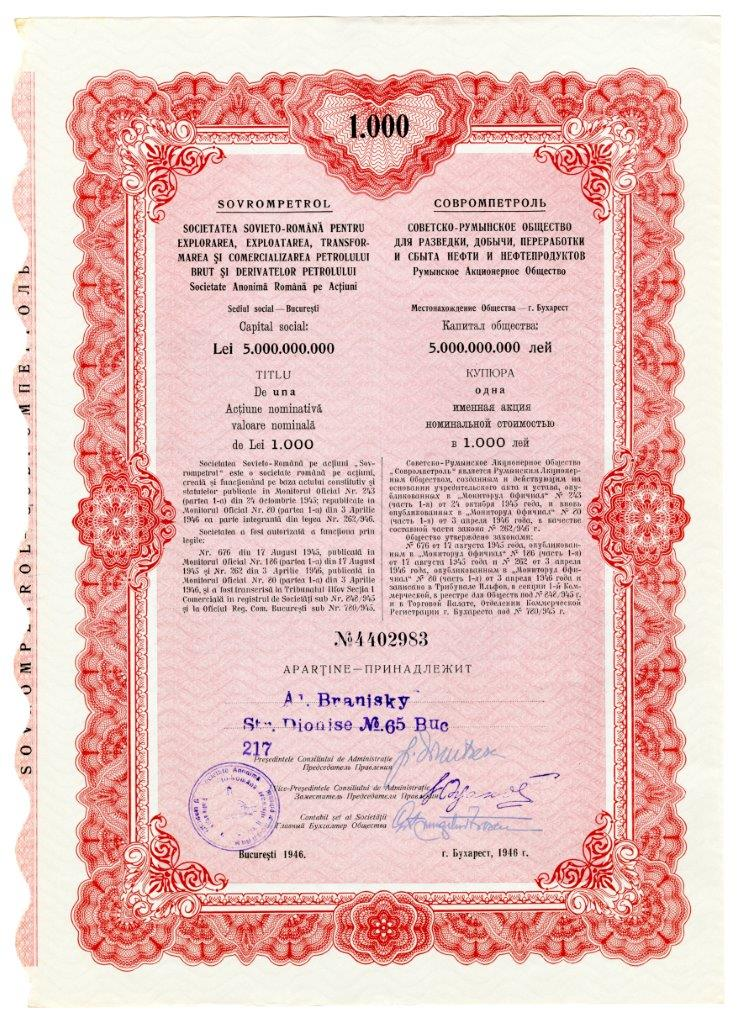
A nominal 1,000 lei Sovrompetrol stock certificate, Bucharest, 1946

An agreement between the two countries regarding the establishment of common enterprises was signed in Moscow on 8 May 1945, at a time when Romania found itself in economic isolation.

The first SovRom to be created (on 17 July 1945), was Sovrompetrol, which had as its objective the exploitation of petroleum in Prahova County areas and the oil refineries in Ploiești. By 1947, it was responsible for 37% of oil drilling, some 30% of the total production of crude oil, and over 36% of refined oil, controlling 37% of internal oil supplies and 38% of external ones.

Sovrompetrol was followed by Sovromtransport and Tars (transportation), and later by Sovrombanc (banking and commercial monopoly), Sovromlemn (wood processing), Sovromgaz (natural gas), Sovromasigurare (insurance), Sovromcărbune (coal exploitation in the Jiu Valley and other areas), Sovromchim (chemical industry), Sovromconstrucții (construction materials), Sovrommetal (iron mining — around Reșița), Sovromtractor (future Tractorul, in Brașov), Sovromfilm (importing Soviet cinema productions), Sovrom Utilaj Petrolier (producing oil refining equipment) and Sovromnaval (shipbuilding in Constanța, Giurgiu, and Brăila).

Most notoriously, Sovromcuarț (or Sovromquarțit, Sovrom Kvartit), while ostensibly producing quartz, as its name suggested, was in fact engaged in the mining of uranium ore. Sovromcuarț started operating in 1950 at the Băița mine in Bihor County, with a workforce of 15,000 political prisoners. After most of them died of radiation poisoning, they were replaced by local villagers, who did not know what they were mining. Another facility operated by this SovRom was the Ciudanovița uranium mine in Caraș-Severin County, which employed around 10,000 people in the early 1950s. In secrecy, Romania delivered 17,288 tons of uranium ore to the Soviet Union between 1952 and 1960, which was used, at least partly, in the Soviet atomic bomb project. Uranium mining continued until 1961. All ore was shipped outside Romania for processing, initially to Sillamäe in Estonia; the uranium concentrate was then used exclusively by the Soviet Union.

By 1952, 85% of Romanian export was directed at the Soviet Union. The total value of goods passed by Romania to the Soviet Union surpassed by far the demanded war reparations, being estimated at 2 billion dollars.

Special circumstances also enhanced the negative effects of SovRoms on Romanian economy: the severe drought and famine outbreaks of 1946, coupled with the severe devaluation of the leu — culminating in a forced stabilization through monetary reform (1947).

=== Ending ===
The SovRoms' end, evidence of the relative emancipation of the Romanian Workers' Party from Soviet control, ran parallel to the de-Stalinization process; it was approved by Nikita Khrushchev and carried out by Miron Constantinescu (head of the Planning Board).

Discussions aimed at winding down the SovRoms began in March 1953. The first measure was taken in 1954 (through accords signed in March and September): Soviet shares in 12 of the 16 enterprises were taken over by the Romanian state, in exchange for a sum to be paid in installments of merchandise exports (in 1959, the debt was set at over 35 billion lei). Payments were completed in 1975. The initial sum at which the Soviet side estimated its contribution was 9.6 billion lei, in contrast to the 2.9 billion lei at which it had been valued by Romanian sources; discussions on the matter reduced the sum to a total of 5.3 billion lei, which was construed by the two sides not as a corrected result, but as a concession owing to past irregularities in SovRom activities. At the same time, the Soviet Union announced that it gave up interests in formerly German-owned enterprises and equipment on Romanian soil, for which Romania paid 1.5 billion lei as compensation (deducted from the total 5.3 billion).

The last two remaining SovRoms, Sovrompetrol and Sovromcuarț, were disbanded in 1956. However, the Romanian government signed an agreement that would replace Sovromcuarț with a new state-owned company which was to carry on the mining and processing of uranium ore, delivering its entire output to the Soviet Union. This successor company was itself dissolved in 1961. Soviet investment in Sovromcuarț was evaluated to a debt of 413 million rubles, which were to be paid by Romania over a 10-year period (starting with 1961).

The gesture was used by First Secretary Gheorghe Gheorghiu-Dej, who had previously ensured the SovRom's efficiency, as a means to gain popularity with Romanian citizens and, in parallel, to advertise the idea that Romania had the sufficient “requirements” for socialism after completing nationalization.

== See also ==
- Comecon
