= Jesse Larner =

Jesse Larner is a New York-based writer on politics and culture. He is the author of Mount Rushmore: An Icon Reconsidered (Nation Books, 2002) and Forgive Us Our Spins: Michael Moore and the Future of the Left (Wiley and Sons, 2006.) His work has been featured on Radio Nation, the Kojo Nnamdi Show, and NPR. He has appeared in the documentary film Manufacturing Dissent (2007), Penn & Teller's investigative television program, and on PBS' "History Detectives." He wrote a blog on the Huffington Post website until 2017.
