= Alice Bourneuf =

1912-1980, American economist

- Born: Alice Elizabeth Bourneuf; October 2, 1912; Haverhill, Massachusetts
- Died: December 7, 1980 (aged 68); Boston, Massachusetts
- Education: Radcliffe College
- Occupations: Economist, educator

Alice Elizabeth Bourneuf (1912–1980) was an American economist and educator. She is known for her knowledge of international monetary policy and her contributions to the organization of the Marshall Plan.

== Biography ==
Bourneuf was born on October 2, 1912, in Haverhill, Massachusetts. She attended Radcliffe College where she earned her A.B. in 1933, Radcliffe Graduate School earning her M.A. in 1939 and her Ph.D. in 1955. Her classmates included John Kenneth Galbraith, Richard Musgraven and Paul Samuelson.

After receiving her M.A., Bourneuf held a research fellowship in Belgium to study trade issues. She was forced to return to the United States due to the German invasion of Belgium. She settled in Washington, DC where she worked for the Federal Reserve Board and the International Monetary Fund. Bourneuf attended the Bretton Woods Conference in 1944. She spent 1948 though 1953 in Europe where she worked as a senior economist at the Marshall Plan organization.

Bourneuf embarked on a teaching career full-time in 1954. She taught at Mount Holyoke College, the University of California, Berkeley and then Boston College (BC). In 1959 she became the first woman to hold a tenured position at BC's College of Arts and Sciences. She retired in 1977 as economics professor emeritus.

She died on December 7, 1980, in Boston, Massachusetts.
