= Edgar Larner =

English engineer & scientist (1869-1930)

Edgar Thomas Larner (1869 in Norwich, Norfolk, England – 1930 in Hackney, London, England), his occupation was that of engineer/scientist for the GPO (General Post Office) Engineering-Telephones. In those days the GPO was a part of the Civil Service, so he was a civil servant. He was a television and radio experimenter and pioneer. He also taught at the Hackney Institute, London. He was a friend of both John Logie Baird and Philo Farnsworth. He died in 1930 at the age of 61 in Hackney, London, England.

== Published articles and books ==
- Radio and High Frequency Currents. London, 1923. Series (Lockwood’s Technical Manuals)
- Alternating Currents ... Including "The Principles of Alternating Currents," etc. London, 1908, 1915, 1923, 1929. (Lockwood’s Technical Manuals)
- Crystal Sets, etc. A. Rogers & Co.: London, (1924)
- Radio and High Frequency Currents ... Second edition, enlarged. V. C. Lockwood & Son: London, 1925
- Valve Sets: construction and maintenance. Rogers & Co.: London, 1925
- Practical Television, etc. (With plates.) & foreword by close friend John Logie Baird Ernest Benn: London, 1928
- Practical Television, etc. 2nd edition (With plates.) & foreword by close friend John Logie Baird Ernest Benn: London Van Nostrand New York, 1928
- Present-Day Valve Sets. Construction and maintenance. Rogers & Co.: London, (1930)
