= Sesame Beginnings =

Product line based on Sesame Street

Sesame Beginnings is a line of products and a video series, spun off from the children's television series Sesame Street, featuring baby versions of the characters. The line is targeted towards infants and toddlers, and their parents, and products are designed to increase family interactivity.

== Product line ==
The line was launched in mid-2005 in Canada, with a line of products exclusive to a family of Canadian retailers that includes Loblaws, Fortinos, and Zehrs. The initial offering included apparel, health and body, home, and seasonal products.

Soon after, the line expanded to merchandise, including Random House books, available in the United States. Target is the primary retailer for the items in the U.S. Other Sesame Beginnings licensors include Crown Crafts (bedding), Fisher-Price (infant toys), Children's Apparel Network (department and specialty store layette, newborn and infant apparel), Hamco, Blue Ridge, Baby Boom, and A.D. Sutton.

All products in the Sesame Beginnings line are ranked on a scale of 1 to 5. Products ranked Level 1 are for birth to 6 months, Level 2 are for 6 to 12 months, Level 3 for 12 to 18 months, Level 4 targets 18 to 24 months, and Level 5 aims for 24–36 months.

=== DVD series ===
The first Beginnings videos were released on April 23, 2006. In the Netherlands, Dutch FilmWorks teamed up with Sesame workshop beginning on the said day. In Spain Planeta Junior also teamed up with Sesame Workshop.

Beginning Together
Brandy and her daughter Sy'rai appear in the video.
Make Music Together
Wayne Brady and his daughter Maile appear in the video.
Exploring Together
Matt Lauer and his daughter Romy host the episode.
Moving Together
Sarah Jessica Parker and her friend Sophia appear in the video.

==== Cast ====
- Kevin Clash as Baby Elmo – The youngest of the babies at 13 months.
- Bill Barretta as Louie – Elmo's dad.
- Fran Brill as Baby Prairie Dawn – The oldest of the babies at two-years-old.
- Leslie Carrara-Rudolph as Prairie Dawn's mom.
- Matt Vogel as Baby Big Bird – The second oldest of the babies at 19 months.
- Pam Arciero as Nani Bird – Big Bird's Hawaiian aunt.
- Tyler Bunch as Baby Cookie Monster – The third oldest of the babies at 16 months.
- Rickey Boyd as Grandma Cookie Monster – Cookie Monster's elderly caretaker.
- In addition, Granny Bird makes a cameo appearance in Beginning Together. Caroll Spinney reprises his role for the character.

==== Crew ====
- Jocelyn Hassenfeld, producer
- Dionne Nosek, producer
- Kevin Clash, co-producer, director
- Christine Ferraro, writer
- Liz Nealon, Executive Vice President, Creative Director, Sesame Workshop
- Rosemarie T. Truglio, Vice President Education and Research, Sesame Workshop
- Anna E. Housley Juster, Director of Content, Sesame Workshop
- Sandblast Productions
- Handcranked Productions

=== Books ===
There were some Sesame Street books published before Beginnings, starring the characters as babies. These books included photography of puppet-like models created of the characters. In contrast, Beginnings books feature flat colour illustrations of the characters. As well as this, the books also feature appearances from characters not present in the series, such as Bert and Ernie, Grover and Mr. Snuffleupagus.

- Cookie Kisses (with Baby Cookie Monster, level 1)
- Sesame Beginnings to Go: At the Store (with Baby Grover, level 2)
- Sesame Beginnings to Go: Away We Go (with Baby Zoe, level 2)
- Sesame Beginnings to Go: In My Stroller (with Baby Elmo, level 1)
- Sesame Beginnings to Go: Time to Eat (with Baby Cookie Monster, level 1)
- Snap! Button! Zip! (with Baby Zoe, level 3)
- Cookie Rhyme, Cookie Time (with Baby Cookie Monster, level 4)
- Hello! Good-bye! (with Baby Ernie, level 3)
- Clang-Clang! Bang-Bang! (with Baby Grover, level 1)
- So Big! (with Baby Elmo, level 2)
- Baby Faces (with Baby Zoe, level 1)
- Cookie See! Cookie Do! (with Baby Cookie, level 3)
- Pat-A-Cake and Other First Baby Games (with Baby Elmo and Baby Zoe, level 4)
- Peekaboo! I See You! (with Baby Big Bird, level 2)
- Sing a Song of Sixpence (with Baby Zoe and Baby Ernie, level 5)
- It's Naptime, Little One (with baby Elmo, Prairie Dawn, Cookie Monster, Grover, Curly Bear, and Big Bird, level 3)
- Eyes & Nose, Fingers & Toes (with Baby Elmo, Cookie Monster, Big Bird, Zoe and Grover)
- At the Zoo (with Baby Elmo, Cookie Monster, Big Bird and Zoe)
- Bubbles, Bubbles (with Baby Elmo, Cookie Monster, Big Bird, Ernie and Bert)
- Nighty Night (with Baby Elmo, Cookie Monster, Big Bird, Zoe, Ernie, Bert and Snuffleupagus)

== History of the line ==
Sherrie Westin, Executive Vice President comments: "Our own research showed that Sesame Street videos were among those frequently viewed by the under two set, in spite of the fact that the content and curriculum of Sesame Street is designed for ages 2-5. With the Sesame Beginnings DVDs, we're providing parents and caregivers of children under two with content specifically designed to use media as a tool to further adult/child interaction."

The same "underviewing" of Sesame Street is what had earlier inspired show producers to add in the very young-targeted Elmo's World segment.

The concept of the Sesame Street cast as babies was not entirely new, as infant versions of characters were available as toys since 2002. Many likened the line to previous series like Muppet Babies.

=== Supporting Research ===
In 2007, researchers at the University of Michigan conducted a study on the efficacy of different infant-directed videos to promote parent-child interaction. Sesame Beginnings was included in this research and findings showed that it helped promote interaction by educating parents on how to optimize interaction with their children. After co-viewing sessions of Sesame Beginnings, parents were found to interact more with their infants. These post-viewing interactions were also measured to be of higher quality.

=== Controversy and criticism ===
The production of DVDs and other screen-based media for children under the age of two is extremely controversial. The American Academy of Pediatrics recommends that children under two be kept away from screen media and Sesame Beginnings has been criticized by a number of early childhood development experts who point to research suggesting that television viewing by infants can harm language development and sleep patterns. An April 23, 2006 article in The Washington Post quoted Harvard Medical School psychologist Susan Linn as saying "There is no evidence that media is beneficial for babies, and they are starting to find evidence that it may be harmful. Until we know for sure, we shouldn't risk putting them in front of the television."

Sesame Street Kids’ Guide to Life has countered such criticism by pointing to their partnership with Zero to Three, a respected American nonprofit child-development and advocacy organization, to produce the DVDs and also that they were extensively researched and tested by respected experts in childhood development. However, one of Zero to Three's original founders, noted pediatrician T. Berry Brazelton, was among the signatories of a letter of protest that was submitted to Zero to Three calling on the organization to disassociate itself with the project.

== Advisory board ==
Beginnings, like all Sesame Workshop and Kids’ Guide to Life projects, included an advisory committee of "national child development and media experts"

- Daniel R. Anderson, Ph.D., University of Massachusetts Amherst
- Rachel Barr, Ph.D., Georgetown University
- Lori A. Custodero, D.M.A., Teachers College, Columbia University
- Claire Lerner, L.C.S.W., ZERO TO THREE
- Kyle Pruett, M.D., Yale University School of Medicine
- Claudia A. Saad, M.A., CCC-SLP, American Speech–Language–Hearing Association
