= Hayyim Zvi Lerner =

Russian Hebrew grammarian, writer and educator

Ḥayyim Zvi Lerner
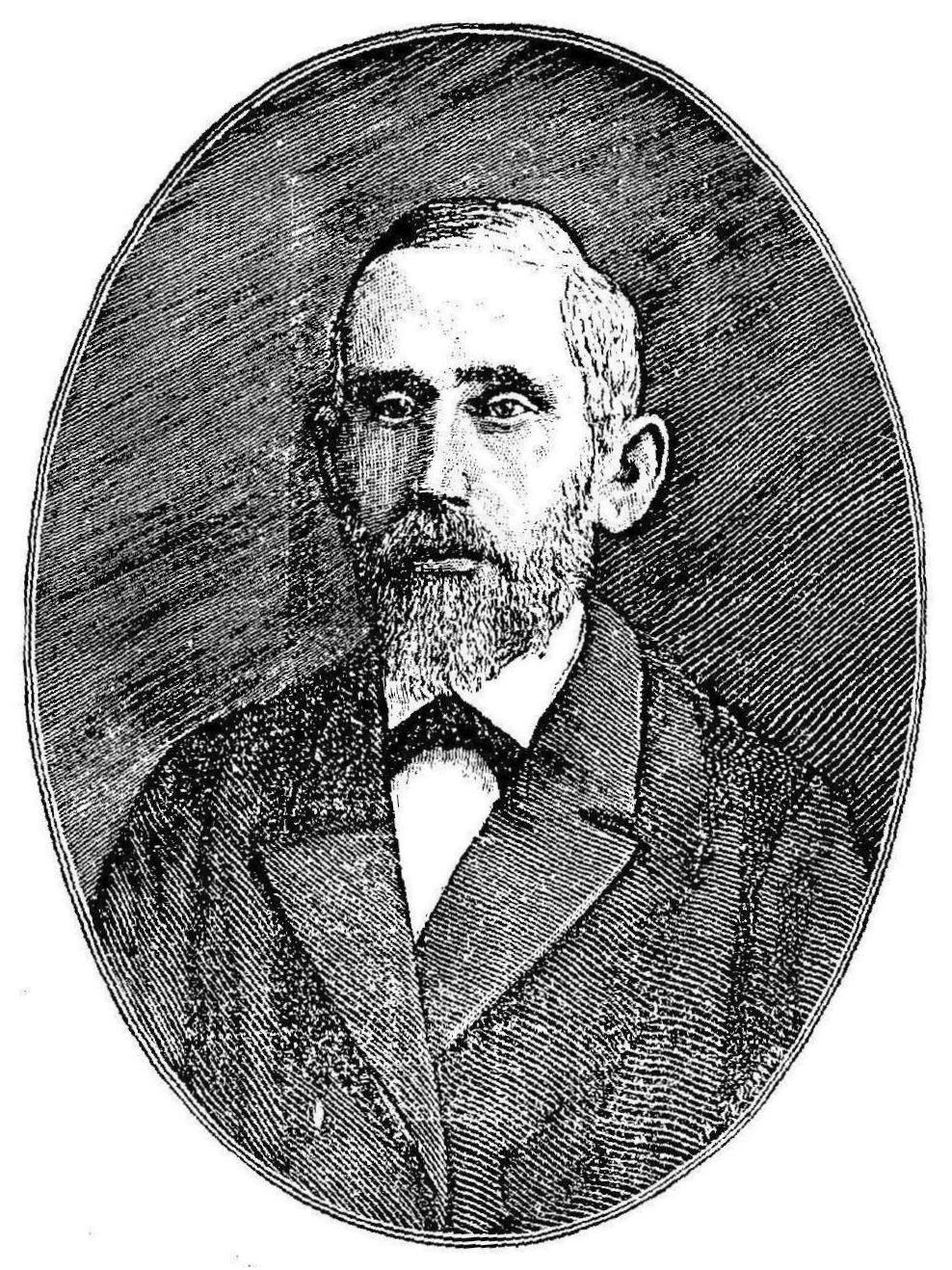
- Born: 24 April 1815; Dubno, Volhynia, Russian Empire
- Died: 6 April 1889 (aged 73); Zhitomir, Volhynia, Russian Empire
- Writing career
- Language: Hebrew
- Literary movement: Haskalah

Ḥayyim Zvi Lerner (Yiddish: חיים צבי לערנער; 24 April 1815 – 6 April 1889), also known by the acronym Ḥatzal (חצ״ל), was a Russian grammarian of Hebrew, writer, poet, and educator.

== Biography ==
Ḥayyim Ẓvi Lerner was born in Dubno on Erev Pesaḥ, 1815. His early education centered around the study of the Bible and Talmud under his father's guidance. At the young age of thirteen, he entered into marriage. In 1833, Lerner became a disciple of Wolf Adelsohn, who had gathered a group of Maskilim in Dubno to study Hebrew grammar and philosophy. He relocated to Odessa in 1835 and enrolled in Bezaleel Stern's model school, where Simḥah Pinsker instructed him in Hebrew grammar. During his time there, he also gained proficiency in Russian, German, French, and Italian.

In 1838, Lerner returned to Dubno and became a teacher of Hebrew. He taught in Radzivilov from 1841 to 1849, and was appointed government teacher for the Jewish public school in Berdychev on 16 November 1849. In 1851, he took up a position as a Hebrew teacher at the rabbinical school in Zhitomir, remaining in this role until the government's closure of the school on 1 July 1873.

Lerner's legacy in the field of Hebrew grammar is primarily attributed to his work Moreh ha-Lashon. Written in accessible, pure Hebrew, the book adopted the structure of grammar books on European languages, offering students a more approachable means of learning the language compared to previous works. The work is also noted for its preference for Classical over Rabbinical Hebrew. The first edition was published in Leipzig in 1859, followed by six more editions during Lerner's lifetime, and even more after his death.

In addition to his grammar book, Lerner wrote Diḳduḳ leshon Aramit (Warsaw, 1875), a grammar of the Aramaic language; Ma'amar toledot ha-diḳduḳ (Vienna, 1876); and a translation of S. D. Luzzatto's Diḳduḳ leshon Talmud Bavli (St. Petersburg, 1880). Among his unpublished manuscripts were Yalḳut, a compilation of commentaries on the Bible and Rashi, together with critical and literary essays; Arba' middot, a work on the Baraita of the thirty-two Middot; and a Hebrew translation of Edward Young's Night-Thoughts along with other poems. He was also a frequent contributor of articles and poetry to the Hebrew press, including the journals Ha-Maggid, Ha-Karmel, Ha-Melitz, Ha-Shaḥar, and Ha-Boker Or.

== Selected publications ==
- Sefer Moreh ha-lashon. Zhitomir: Y. M. Baksht. 1872 [1859].
- Sefer Diḳduḳ leshon Aramit. Warsaw: Y. Goldman. 1875.
- Ma'amar toledot ha-diḳduḳ. Vienna: G. Brag & F. Smolenskin. 1876.
- Diḳduḳ leshon Talmud Bavli. St. Petersburg: A. Zederbaum & A. Y. Goldenblum. 1880.
