= Claire Lerner =

Claire Lerner, L.C.S.W. is the Director of Parenting Resources at Zero to Three: National Center for Infants, Toddlers, and Families, a non-profit dedicated to promoting the healthy development and well-being of infants, toddlers, and their families.

In 2003, Lerner and the Parents Action for Children (then called the "I Am Your Child Foundation") created a video series called Building a Healthy Start.

In 2005, Lerner became part of the Sesame Beginnings Advisory Board, which included other "national child development and media experts".

== Publications ==
- Learning and Growing Together: Understanding and Supporting Your Child's Development, as editor, 28 April 2000
- Learning & Growing Together Tip Sheets: Ideas for Professionals in Programs That Serve Young Children and Their Families, with Stefanie Powers, September 2000
- Bringing Up Baby: Three Steps to Making Good Decisions in Your Child's First Years, with Amy Dombro, 2005, ISBN 0-943657-62-8
