= Immiserizing growth =

Theoretical concept of economic growth that, paradoxically, worsens the economy

Immiserizing growth is a theoretical situation first proposed by Jagdish Bhagwati, in 1958, where economic growth could result in a country being worse off than before the growth. If growth is heavily export based, it might lead to a fall in the terms of trade of the exporting country. In rare circumstances, this fall in the terms of trade may be so large as to outweigh the gains from growth. If so, this situation would cause a country to be worse off after growth than before. This result is only valid if the growing country is able to influence world prices. Harry G. Johnson had, independently, worked out conditions for this result in 1955.

== Definition ==
The term "Immiserizing growth" is composed of the concepts of "Immiserizing" and "growth." In this context, Immiserizing can be understood as a social welfare loss. such as a decline in real income or job losses. The term "growth" here refers to export specialization and export expansion in the affected countries. For these countries, this means that they primarily focus on one product for exports and produce it in large quantities.

The term "impoverishment growth" is also used when a country expands its production capacity for an export good, but at the same time, the prices of imported goods also rise. Although the country produces more, it becomes impoverished because the prices of imported goods rise more sharply than the profit gained from the additional exports.

== Theoretical approach according to Bhagwati ==
In his 1958 article "Immiserizing Growth: A Geometrical Note," Jagdish Bhagwati demonstrated the conditions for immiserating growth using a two-country, two-goods model. He clarified that this phenomenon can occur even in a stable market environment.

According to Bhagwati, two extreme conditions are necessary for this growth. First, the growth must be heavily export-oriented, and second, this growth must be accompanied by relatively inelastic supply and demand functions. This means that supply and demand remain relatively constant despite rising prices, which is particularly true for basic foodstuffs and fuels. The growth in impoverishment takes place largely in developing countries, as these are mainly suppliers of primary goods and are economically dependent on the export of these goods. Under conditions where the price ratio on the world market is not constant and the income elasticity for agricultural products in the importing countries is relatively low, export prices in developing countries fall despite the expansion of production (specialization in exports). At the same time, demand in industrialized countries for their own export goods generally rises more sharply than demand for primary goods. As a result, import prices in developing countries more frequently rise than fall.

These two factors, the rise in import prices and the fall in export prices, together lead to a deterioration of the terms of trade in developing countries. This development often results in a shift in production. Exports are reduced, and the products that were originally intended to be imported are increasingly produced domestically. Ultimately, welfare falls below the level achieved before the export expansion. The economy and the population are therefore worse off than before. This occurs because the rate of decline in the terms of trade is greater than the growth rate of gross domestic product. Consequently, domestic growth is no longer sufficient to maintain the previous import volume, as exports would have to increase for every additional imported good. This model describes a transfer performance which presupposes market instability.

== Causes and Consequences ==
If production costs fall, for example due to technological progress, a country can expand its capacity and thus the quantity supplied. Due to inelastic demand, demand increases less than proportionally to the price decrease. The larger supply cannot compensate for the lower prices, and thus export revenues decrease. Lower export revenues in this case mean that the country also has less foreign currency available to meet its obligations for goods and services from abroad, i.e., to pay for the necessary imports. New borrowing must be increased to meet these obligations. The country operates with ever more debt capital, has to service interest payments, and consequently has less equity capital. These developments have a negative impact on incomes and employment in the country under consideration; the country becomes impoverished. Within just a few years, Vietnam had become the world's second-largest coffee exporter and, thanks to financial support and low wages, was able to flood the global market with cheap coffee. This led to a glut on the world market and caused an international price collapse for coffee, triggering the global coffee crisis of 2000/2001. Since only 4% of the coffee harvest is consumed domestically in Vietnam, this resulted in extremely export-oriented growth. Added to this were limited processing options, meaning that mainly green coffee was exported, for which farmers worldwide received an average of 6.5% of the end-consumer price. However, this growth no longer covered the costs of cultivation, and the population became increasingly impoverished. This growth caused such a drastic decline in the terms of trade that Vietnam was worse off after the export expansion than before.

Vietnam, and other coffee producers, are recovering only slowly from the coffee crisis. The consequences are manifested not only in extreme poverty and unemployment, but also in the destruction of the ecological balance. To restore market equilibrium, among other measures, cultivation areas were diversified, and in 2004, 90,000 hectares of low-quality coffee plantations were converted to the cultivation of pepper, cocoa, and cashew nuts.

== Literature ==
- Willi Albers et al. (eds.): Concise Dictionary of Economics. (HdWW). Volume 2: Education to Fiscal Equalization. Unabridged student edition. G. Fischer et al., Stuttgart et al. 1988.
- Jagdish N. Bhagwati: Distortions and Immiserizing Growth: A Generalization. In: The Review of Economic Studies. Volume 35, No. 4, 1968, pp. 481–485, doi:10.2307/2296774.
- Jagdish N. Bhagwati: Political Economy and International Economics. Edited by Douglas A. Irwin. The MIT Press, Cambridge MA et al. 1996, ISBN 0-262-52218-7.
- Jagdish N. Bhagwati, Arvind Panagariya, Thirukodikaval N. Srinivasan: Lectures on International Trade. 2nd edition. The MIT Press, Cambridge MA et al. 1998, ISBN 0-262-52247-0.
- Georg Dybe: Regional Economic Change. The Perspective of Evolutionary Economics and the "New Growth Theory" (= Urban and Regional Sciences. Volume 2). LIT-Verlag, Münster 2003, ISBN 3-8258-6766-8 (Also: Berlin, Free University, Dissertation, 2002).
- Harry G. Johnson: Increasing Productivity, Income-Price Trends and the Trade Balance. In: The Economic Journal. Volume 64, No. 255, 1954, pp. 462–485, doi:10.2307/2227741.
- Harry G. Johnson: The possibility of income losses from increased efficiency or factor accumulation in the presence of tariffs. In: The Economic Journal. Volume 77, No. 305, 1967, pp. 151–154, doi:10.2307/2229373.
- John R. Hicks: An Inaugural Lecture: I. Introductory Remarks. II. The Long-Run Dollar Problem. In: Oxford Economic Papers. New Series Volume 5, No. 2, 1953, ISSN 0030-7653, pp. 117–135, JSTOR 2661971.
- Bernd Kempa: International Economics. Kohlhammer, Stuttgart 2012, ISBN 978-3-17-020812-4.
- Paul R. Krugman, Maurice Obstfeld: International Economics. Theory and Policy. 6th edition. Addison-Wesley, Boston MA et al. 2002, ISBN 0-321-11639-9, p. 196.
- Thieß Petersen: Immiseration Growth. In: The Business Studies. wisu. Journal for Education, Examination, Career Entry and Further Education. Volume 39, No. 2, 2010, ISSN 0340-3084, pp. 200–206.
- Kenneth A. Reinert, Ramkishen S. Rajan, Amy Jocelyn Glass, Lewis S. Davis (eds.): The Princeton encyclopedia of the world economy. 2 volumes. Princeton University Press, Princeton NJ et al. 2009, ISBN 978-0-691-12812-2.
- Gerhard Rübel: Fundamentals of Real Foreign Trade. Oldenbourg Wirtschaftsverlag, Munich et al. 2004, ISBN 3-486-27560-7 (2nd, fundamentally revised edition. ibid. 2008, ISBN 978-3-486-58770-8).
