= Lerner symmetry theorem =

Result used in international trade theory

The Lerner symmetry theorem is a theorem in international trade theory, which states that an ad valorem import tariff will have the same effects as an equivalent export tax. The original theorem relies on a general equilibrium model with several assumptions. The model assumes an economy with perfect competition, no transaction costs, no foreign ownership of domestic assets, balanced trade, fully flexible prices and exchange rates, and separability of production and consumption.

The theorem was developed by economist Abba P. Lerner in 1936. Modern work has examined the theorem's validity in more complex models of the economy involving imperfect competition, multinational firms, and foreign ownership of domestic assets.
