= Jimmy Lerner =

American poet

Jimmy Lerner was born June 22, 1951, and raised in Brooklyn, New York, and died on February 3, 2008. He spent 18 years as a Pacific Bell (now part of AT&T) marketing executive, served for the U.S. Army in Panama, received an M.B.A. and spent time as a taxicab driver. He published his first book in 2002, You Got Nothing Coming, based on his experiences serving a 2 1/2-year sentence in a Nevada State Prison for the voluntary manslaughter of Mark Slavin in 1997. In his book Lerner used a pseudonym, Dwayne Hassleman, for Slavin.

According to Lerner's account, Slavin was a seemingly ordinary person, but drug addiction left him prone to erratic and often violent behavior. When the two men visited Reno, Nevada, to try their luck at the blackjack tables, Slavin assaulted Lerner, then tried to kill him in their room at the Sundowner hotel-casino. After Slavin threatened Lerner's two daughters, Lerner killed Slavin using a belt and a plastic bag. He then called 9-1-1 from the room, and was taken into custody shortly after. Since there was nobody else in the room at the time, Lerner's version of events could not be verified.

The police report and physical evidence contained evidence in conflict with Lerner's version of events. Slavin had been beaten badly: his eyes were swollen shut and bones protruded through his face. The shapes of a turtle and a steer's head—decorations from Slavin's belt—were imprinted on his neck. Lerner's main injuries, by contrast, were badly swollen hands. His jeans were covered with blood.

In his novel, Lerner describes his victim as six foot four inches tall and well over 200 pounds, while Slavin was only five foot four, weighing 133 pounds. The police report from the crime indicates that Slavin was more likely tortured and then killed, rather than being killed in self-defense. In an introduction to the paperback edition of his book Lerner said he had presented the "emotional truth" of his story; that he made his victim physically huge because he seemed huge to Lerner, and that out of personal weakness he had tried to make himself out to be "a far braver, stronger, and more heroic person than I really was—or am."

Lerner pleaded guilty to a reduced plea of voluntary manslaughter with use of a deadly weapon, and was given two six-year sentences, to be served consecutively. He began his first sentence on July 4, 1999, and after three parole attempts was released on January 4, 2002.

In 2004, Slavin's sister Donna Seres sued Lerner under Nevada's Son of Sam law, which prohibits criminals from profiting from their crimes. On December 23, 2004, the Nevada Supreme Court found the law unconstitutional and dismissed the case.

Lerner has written a book of poetry, It's All Part of the Punishment, which is published on his website. As of 2005 he was at work on a novel entitled The Therapy Ain't Working.

In 2002, Scott Adams, the author of Dilbert, pointed out that he had a cubicle near Lerner while working at Pacific Bell. Adams also jokingly claims that, indirectly, he influenced Lerner into becoming an author.
