= I. Michael Lerner =

Geneticist and evolutionary biologist

- Born: Israel Michael Lerner; May 14, 1910; Harbin, Russia (now Manchuria, China)
- Died: June 12, 1977 (aged 67)
- Education: University of California, Berkeley (Ph.D. 1936)
- Known for: Study of the effects of artificial selection with inbreeding
- Scientific career
- Fields: Genetics, evolutionary biology
- Institutions: University of California, Berkeley

Israel Michael Lerner (May 14, 1910 – June 12, 1977) was a prominent geneticist and evolutionary biologist. Born in Harbin, Manchuria, he received his Ph.D. in genetics at the University of California, Berkeley in 1936. He was appointed instructor of poultry husbandry and joined the university's department of genetics in 1958. 1949 Jul; 34(4): 395–411. Much of his research involved the inheritance of components underlying egg production, the effects of artificial selection with inbreeding, and theoretical models predicting the effects of simultaneous selection upon numerous inherited characteristics. A number of his books include Population Genetics and Animal Improvement (1950),Genetic Homeostasis (1954), The Genetic Basis of Selection (1958) and Heredity, Evolution and Society (1968). He also served as editor for the journal Evolution, and was an elected member of the National Academy of Sciences, the American Philosophical Society, and the American Academy of Arts and Sciences.
