= Melanie Smith (artist) =

British artist

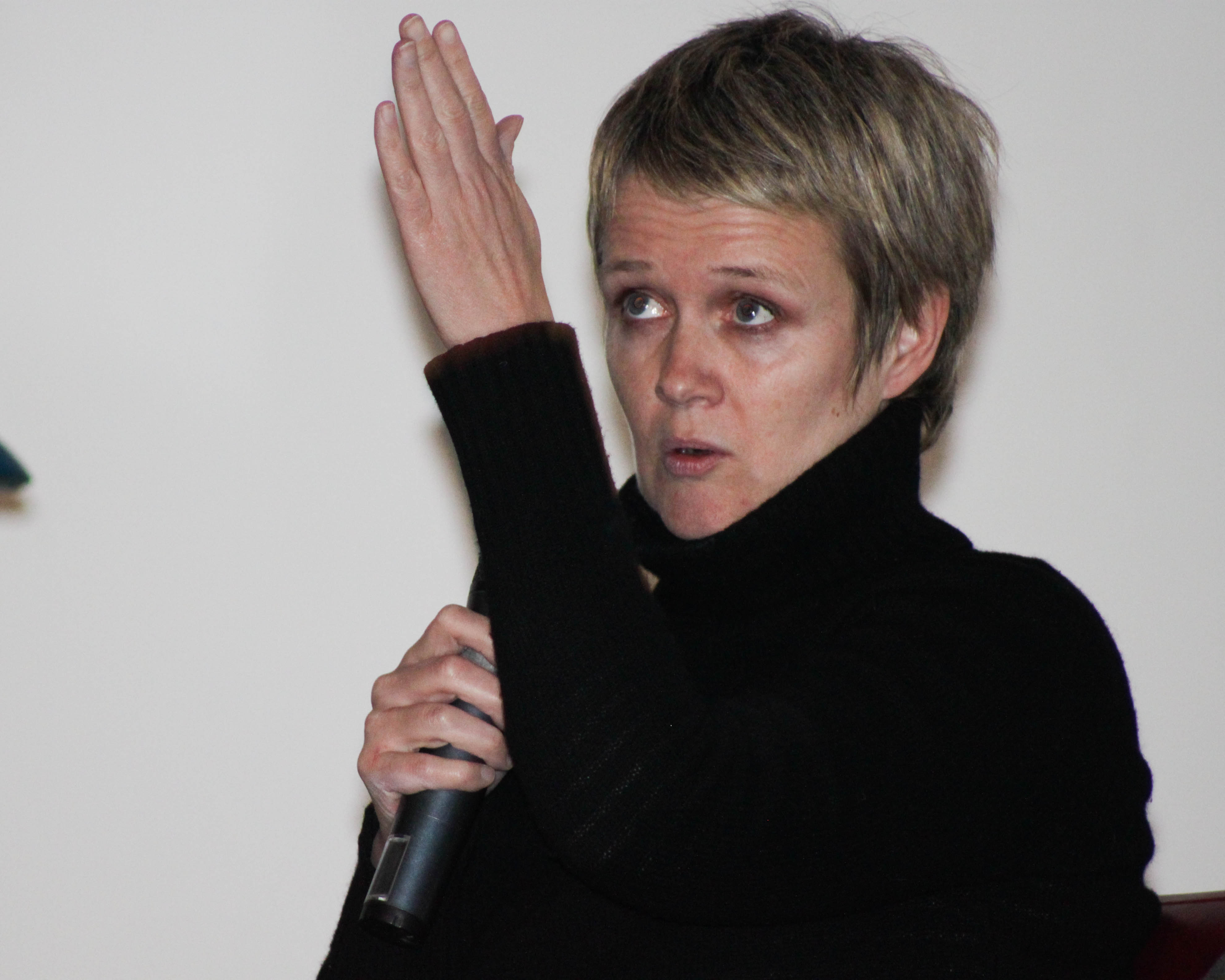
- Smith in 2012
- Born: 1965 (age 60–61); Poole, England
- Education: University of Reading

Melanie Smith (born 1965) is a British artist based in Mexico City.

== Biography ==
Melanie Smith was born in 1965 in Poole, England. She studied painting at the University of Reading. Since 1989, she has lived and worked in Mexico City.

== Works ==
Her earlier pieces considered Mexico City itself. For her 2002 film, Spiral City, Smith rented a helicopter to fly over east of Mexico City. Her film is based on an abstract grid of the city following the movements of a helicopter flying in widening spirals. It was made in collaboration with cinematographer Rafael Ortega and also include a series of paintings and photographs.

Another work of Smith’s, Orange Lush (1995), is a series of several installations of objects on boards. These installations contained "bright orange plastic objects, among them life-preservers, extension cords, buoys, cheerleader’s pom-poms, water-wings, flip-flops, light bulbs, balloons, and water rafts." Although the objects seem to be placed randomly, their placement is actually well thought out. There are slight contrasts between rounded objects and objects that are deflated and flattened. This, argues art historian Amanda Boetzkes, is meant to convey "a broader stalemate between sensorial plenitude and economic exhaustion." Orange Lush performs an aesthetic critique of Mexico’s consumerist economy and the overflowing need for “stuff”. Smith chose the chemical orange color because to her it always screamed “for sale”, which was fitting for the statement she is making about Mexican consumerism. Also, Boetzkes says the color orange “marked the invasion of Mexico City with cheap commodities in the 1990s, after inflation and bailouts from the United States and the Bank for International Settlements caused a devaluation of the peso.” This event describes the exhaustion of economics that Smith tries to bring into her Orange Lush piece. Orange is commonly known as the color of fake value and meaningless products. This is something that Smith calls “chemically induced enthusiasm,” which means it is fabricated happiness or excitement—it is not reality. This is what global consumption is; there is momentary gratification and then it means nothing.

Lastly, one of Smith’s big collaborative performance pieces is Aztec Stadium (2010), done with 3,000 secondary school students, and the whole process was filmed. Smith also partnered with Rafael Ortega on this project. Each student had a tile, which, once held up, created large mosaics based on the history of Mexico. Some examples of the images used were “Malevich’s Red Square, as well as from Mexican nationalist imaginaries and even from the popular imaginaries of mass culture, such as the mythical wrestler Santo, wearer of the silver mask.” This process was experimental because the outcome was not always known. As the process went on, students had difficulty following instructions, causing the images to become. There were waves of chaos and control throughout the whole piece, which ended up becoming a large part of the piece.

== Exhibitions ==
- Tate Britain (2006)
- "Six steps to reality," Museum of Contemporary Art San Diego;
- "Parres," Miami Art Museum,
- "Spiral city and other artificial pleasures", List Visual Arts Center
- 2011 Venice Biennale

== Collections ==
- Art Gallery of Ontario
- Museum of Contemporary Art San Diego
- Museum of Modern Art, New York
- Tate Museum
- Zabludowicz Collection
