= Monopoly =

Market structure with a single firm dominating the market

A monopoly (from Greek μόνος, mónos, 'single, alone' and πωλεῖν, pōleîn, 'to sell') is a market in which one person or company is the only supplier of a particular good or service. A monopoly is characterized by a lack of economic competition to produce a particular thing, a lack of viable substitute goods, and the possibility of a high monopoly price well above the seller's marginal cost that leads to a high monopoly profit. The verb monopolise or monopolize refers to the process by which a company gains the ability to raise prices or exclude competitors. In economics, a monopoly is a single seller. In law, a monopoly is a business entity that has significant market power, that is, the power to charge overly high prices, which is associated with unfair price raises. Although monopolies may be big businesses, size is not a characteristic of a monopoly. A small business may still have the power to raise prices in a small industry (or market).

A monopoly may also have monopsony control of a sector of a market. A monopsony is a market situation in which there is only one buyer. Likewise, a monopoly should be distinguished from a cartel, in which several providers act together to coordinate services, prices or sale of goods. Monopolies, monopsonies and oligopolies are all situations in which one or a few entities have market power and therefore interact with their customers, or suppliers in ways that distort the market.

Monopolies can be formed by mergers and integrations, form naturally, or be established by a government. In many jurisdictions, competition laws restrict monopolies due to government concerns over potential adverse effects. Holding a dominant position or a monopoly in a market is often not illegal in itself; however, certain categories of behavior can be considered abusive and therefore incur legal sanctions when business is dominant. A government-granted monopoly or legal monopoly, by contrast, is sanctioned by the state, often to provide an incentive to invest in a risky venture or enrich a domestic interest group. Patents, copyrights, and trademarks are sometimes used as examples of government-granted monopolies. The government may also reserve the venture for itself, thus forming a government monopoly, for example with a state-owned company.

Monopolies may be naturally occurring due to limited competition because the industry is resource intensive and requires substantial costs to operate.

== Market structures ==
Market structure is determined by the following factors:

- Barriers to entry: Competition within the market will determine the firm's future profits, and future profits will determine the entry and exit barriers to the market. Estimating entry, exit and profits are decided by three factors: the intensity of competition in short-term prices, the magnitude of sunk costs of entry faced by potential entrants, and the magnitude of fixed costs faced by incumbents.
- The number of companies in the market: If the number of firms in the market increases, the value of firms remaining and entering the market will decrease, leading to a high probability of exit and a reduced likelihood of entry.
- Product substitutability: Product substitution is the phenomenon where customers can choose one product over another. This is the main way to distinguish a monopolistic competition market from a perfect competition market.

In economics, the idea of monopolies is important in the study of management structures, which directly concerns normative aspects of economic competition, and provides the basis for topics such as industrial organization and economics of regulation. There are four basic types of market structures in traditional economic analysis: perfect competition, monopolistic competition, oligopoly, and monopoly. A monopoly is a structure in which a single supplier produces and sells a given product or service. If there is a single seller in a certain market and there are no close substitutes for the product, then the market structure is that of a "pure monopoly". Sometimes, there are many sellers in an industry or there exist many close substitutes for the goods being produced, but nevertheless, companies retain some market power. This is termed "monopolistic competition", whereas in an oligopoly, the companies interact strategically.

In general, the main results from this theory compare the price-fixing methods across market structures, analyze the effect of a certain structure on welfare, and vary technological or demand assumptions in order to assess the consequences for an abstract model of society. Most economic textbooks follow the practice of carefully explaining the "perfect competition" model, mainly because this helps to understand departures from it (the so-called "imperfect competition" models).

The boundaries of what constitutes a market and what does not are relevant distinctions to make in economic analysis. In a general equilibrium context, a good is a specific concept including geographical and time-related characteristics. Most studies of market structure relax a little their definition of a good, allowing for more flexibility in the identification of substitute goods.

== Characteristics ==
A monopoly has at least one of these five characteristics:

- Profit maximizer: monopolists will choose the price or output to maximise profits at where MC=MR. This output will be somewhere over the price range, where demand is price elastic. If the total revenue is higher than total costs, the monopolists will make abnormal profits.
- Price maker: Decides the price of the good or product to be sold, but does so by determining the quantity in order to demand the price desired by the firm.
- High barriers to entry: Other sellers are unable to enter the market of the monopoly.
- Single seller: In a monopoly, there is one seller of the good, who produces all the output. Therefore, the whole market is being served by a single company, and for practical purposes, the company is the same as the industry.
- Price discrimination: A monopolist can change the price or quantity of the product. They sell higher quantities at a lower price in a very elastic market, and sell lower quantities at a higher price in a less elastic market.

Market power can be estimated with Lerner index. High profit margins might be caused by different factors, such as risk premiums or monopoly profits.

Monopolies can cause corruption or political bias and reduce labor share.

== Sources of monopoly power ==
Monopolies derive their market power from barriers to entry – circumstances that prevent or greatly impede a potential competitor's ability to compete in a market. There are three major types of barriers to entry: economic, legal, and deliberate.

- Elasticity of demand: In a complete monopolistic market, the demand curve for the product is the market demand curve. There is only one firm within the industry. The monopolist is the sole seller, and its demand is the demand of the entire market. A monopolist is the price setter, but it is also limited by the law of market demand. If he/she sets a high price, the sales volume will inevitably decline; if they expand the sales volume, the price must be lowered, which means that the demand and price in the monopoly market move in opposite directions. Therefore, the demand curve faced by a monopoly is a downward-sloping curve or a negative slope. Since monopolists control the supply of the entire industry, they also control the price of the entire industry and become price setters. A monopolistic firm can have two business decisions: sell less output at a higher price or sell more output at a lower price. There are no close substitutes for the products of a monopolistic firm. Otherwise, other firms can produce substitutes to replace the monopoly firm's products, and a monopolistic firm cannot become the only supplier in the market. So consumers have no other choice.
- Economic barriers: Economic barriers include economies of scale, capital requirements, competitive advantages, de facto standards, network effects, strategic entry deterrence, switching barriers, vendor lock-in, vertical integration and technological superiority.
- Economies of scale: Decreasing unit costs for larger volumes of production. Decreasing costs coupled with large initial costs, If for example, the industry is large enough to support one company of minimum efficient scale then other companies entering the industry will operate at a size that is less than MES, and so cannot produce at an average cost that is competitive with the dominant company. And if the long-term average cost of the dominant company is constantly decreasing, then that company will continue to have the least cost method to provide a good or service.
- Capital requirements: Production processes that require large investments of capital, perhaps in the form of large research and development costs or substantial sunk costs, limit the number of companies in an industry: this is an example of economies of scale.
- Technological superiority: A monopoly may be better able to acquire, integrate, and use the best possible technology in producing its goods while entrants either do not have the expertise or are unable to meet the high fixed costs (see above) needed for the most efficient technology. Thus one large company can often produce goods cheaper than several small companies.
- No substitute goods: A monopoly sells a good for which there is no close substitute. The absence of substitutes makes the demand for that good relatively inelastic, enabling monopolies to extract positive profits.
- Control of natural resources: A prime source of monopoly power is the control of resources (such as raw materials) that are critical to the production of a final good.
- Network externalities: The use of a product by a person can affect the value of that product to other people. This is the network effect. There is a direct relationship between the proportion of people using a product and the demand for that product. In other words, the more people who are using a product, the greater the probability that another individual will start to use the product. This reflects fads and fashion trends, social networks, etc. It can also play a crucial role in the development or acquisition of market power. The most famous current example is the market dominance of the Microsoft Office suite and operating system in personal computers.
- Legal barriers: Legal rights can provide the opportunity to monopolize the market in a good. Intellectual property rights, including patents and copyrights, give a monopolist exclusive control of the production and sale of certain goods. Property rights may give a company exclusive control of the materials necessary to produce a good.
- Advertising: Advertising and brand names with a high degree of consumer loyalty may prove a difficult obstacle to overcome.
- Manipulation: A company wanting to monopolize a market may engage in various types of deliberate action to exclude competitors or eliminate competition. Such actions include collusion, lobbying governmental authorities, and force (see anti-competitive practices).
- First-mover advantage: In some industries, such as electronics, the pace of product innovation is so rapid that the existing firms will be working on the next generation of products whilst launching the current ranges. New entrants are destined to fail unless they have original ideas or can exploit a new market segment.
- Monopolistic price: It may be possible for existing firms to ride on the existence of abnormal profit by what is called entry limit pricing. This involves deliberately setting a low price and temporarily abandoning profit maximization in order to force new entrants out of the market.

In addition to barriers to entry and competition, barriers to exit may be a source of market power. Barriers to exit are market conditions that make it difficult or expensive for a company to end its involvement with a market. High liquidation costs are a primary barrier to exiting. Market exit and shutdown are sometimes separate events. The decision of whether to shut down or operate is not affected by exit barriers. A company will shut down if the price falls below the minimum average variable costs.

== Monopoly versus competitive markets ==
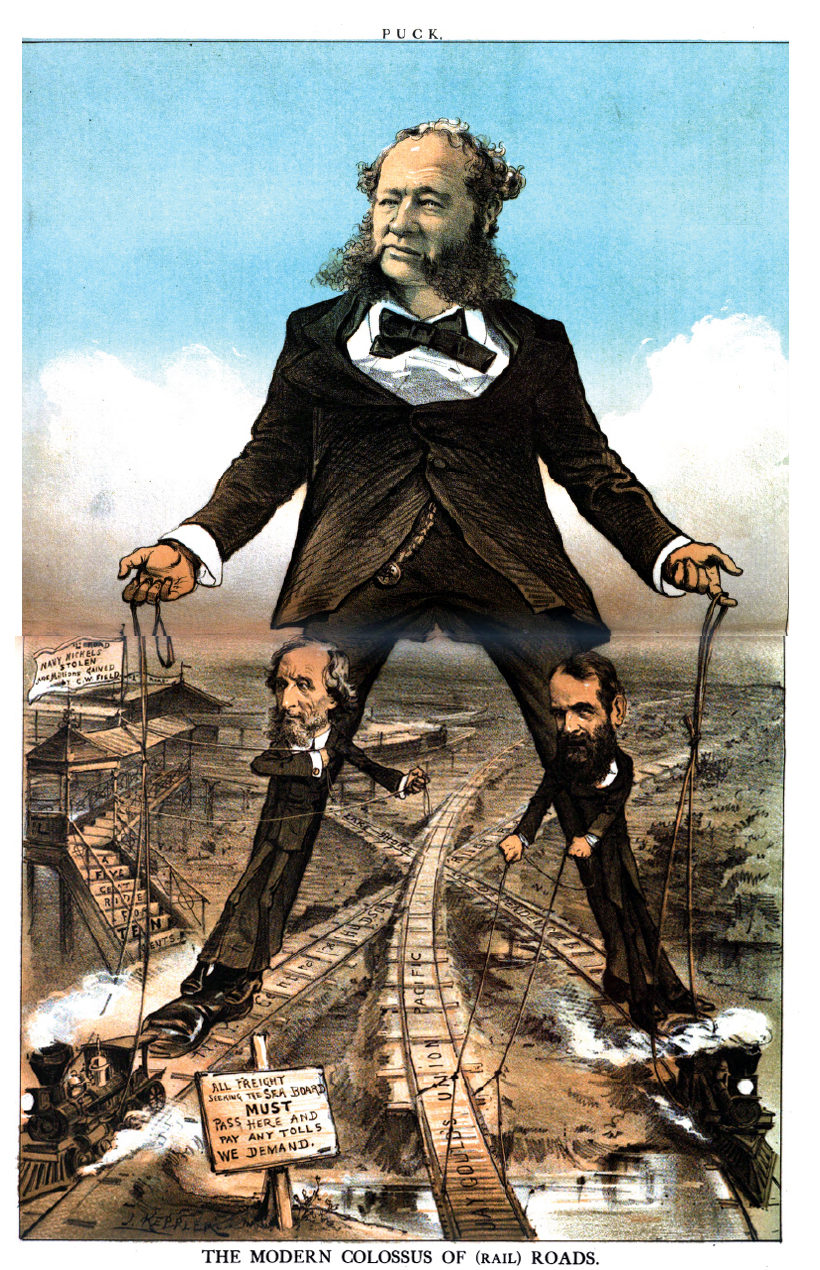
This 1879 anti-monopoly cartoon depicts powerful railroad barons controlling the entire rail system.

While monopoly and perfect competition represent the extremes of market structures. There is some similarity. The cost functions are the same. Both monopolies and perfectly competitive (PC) companies minimize cost and maximize profit. The shutdown decisions are the same. Both are assumed to have perfectly competitive factor markets. There are distinctions; some of the most important are as follows:

- Marginal revenue and price: In a perfectly competitive market, price equals marginal cost. In a monopolistic market, however, price is set above marginal cost. The price equals marginal revenue in this case.
- Product differentiation: There is no product differentiation in a perfectly competitive market. Every product is perfectly homogeneous and a perfect substitute for any other. With a monopoly, there is great to absolute product differentiation in the sense that there is no available substitute for a monopolized good. The monopolist is the sole supplier of the good in question. A customer either buys from the monopolizing entity on its terms or does without.
- Number of competitors: PC markets are populated by a large number of buyers and sellers. A monopoly involves a single seller.
- Barriers to entry: Barriers to entry are factors and circumstances that prevent entry into the market by would-be competitors and limit new companies from operating and expanding within the market. PC markets have free entry and exit. There are no barriers to entry or exit competition. Monopolies have relatively high barriers to entry. The barriers must be strong enough to prevent or discourage any potential competitor from entering the market.
- Elasticity of demand: The price elasticity of demand is the percentage change of demand caused by a one percent change of relative price. A successful monopoly would have a relatively inelastic demand curve. A low coefficient of elasticity is indicative of effective barriers to entry. A PC company has a perfectly elastic demand curve. The coefficient of elasticity for a perfectly competitive demand curve is infinite.
- Excess profits: Excess or positive profits are profit more than the normal expected return on investment. A PC company can make excess profits in the short term but excess profits attract competitors, which can enter the market freely and decrease prices, eventually reducing excess profits to zero. A monopoly can preserve excess profits because barriers to entry prevent competitors from entering the market.
- Profit maximization: A PC company maximizes profits by producing such that price equals marginal costs. A monopoly maximises profits by producing where marginal revenue equals marginal costs. The rules are not equivalent. The demand curve for a PC company is perfectly elastic – flat. The demand curve is identical to the average revenue curve and the price line. Since the average revenue curve is constant, the marginal revenue curve is also constant and equals the demand curve, Average revenue is the same as price ($\text{AR} = \frac{\text{TR}}{Q} = P \cdot \frac{Q}{Q} = P$). Thus, the price line is also identical to the demand curve. In sum, $\text{D} = \text{AR} = \text{MR} = P$.
- P-Max quantity, price and profit: If a monopolist obtains control of a formerly perfectly competitive industry, the monopolist would increase prices, reduce production, incur deadweight loss, and realise positive economic profits.
- Supply curve: in a perfectly competitive market, there is a well-defined supply function with a one-to-one relationship between price and quantity supplied. In a monopolistic market, no such supply relationship exists. A monopolist cannot trace a short-term supply curve because for a given price, there is not a unique quantity supplied. As Pindyck and Rubenfeld note, a change in demand "can lead to changes in prices with no change in output, changes in output with no change in price, or both" Monopolies produce where marginal revenue equals marginal costs. For a specific demand curve, the supply "curve" would be the price-quantity combination at the point where marginal revenue equals marginal cost. If the demand curve shifted, the marginal revenue curve would shift as well, and a new equilibrium and supply "point" would be established. The locus of these points would not be a supply curve in any conventional sense.

The most significant distinction between a PC company and a monopoly is that the monopoly has a downward-sloping demand curve rather than the "perceived" perfectly elastic curve of the PC company. Practically all the variations mentioned above relate to this fact. If there is a downward-sloping demand curve, then by necessity there is a distinct marginal revenue curve. The implications of this fact are best made manifest with a linear demand curve. Assume that the inverse demand curve is of the form $x = a-by$. Then the total revenue curve is $\text{TR} = ay - by^2$ and the marginal revenue curve is thus $\text{MR} = a - 2by$. From this several things are evident. First, the marginal revenue curve has the same $x$-intercept as the inverse demand curve. Second, the slope of the marginal revenue curve is twice that of the inverse demand curve. What is not quite so evident is that the marginal revenue curve is below the inverse demand curve at all points ($y \ge 0$). Since all companies maximise profits by equating $\text{MR}$ and $\text{MC}$ it must be the case that at the profit-maximizing quantity MR and MC are less than price, which further implies that a monopoly produces less quantity at a higher price than if the market were perfectly competitive.

The fact that a monopoly has a downward-sloping demand curve means that the relationship between total revenue and output for a monopoly is much different from that of competitive companies. Total revenue equals price times quantity. A competitive company has a perfectly elastic demand curve meaning that total revenue is proportional to output. Thus the total revenue curve for a competitive company is a ray with a slope equal to the market price. A competitive company can sell all the output it desires at the market price. For a monopoly to increase sales it must reduce price. Thus the total revenue curve for a monopoly is a parabola that begins at the origin and reaches a maximum value then continuously decreases until total revenue is again zero. Total revenue has its maximum value when the slope of the total revenue function is zero. The slope of the total revenue function is marginal revenue. So the revenue maximizing quantity and price occur when $\text{MR} = 0$. For example, assume that the monopoly's demand function is $P = 50 - 2Q$. The total revenue function would be $\text{TR} = 50Q - 2Q^2$ and marginal revenue would be $50 - 4Q$. Setting marginal revenue equal to zero we have

$$50-4Q=0$$
$$-4Q=-50$$
$$Q = 12.5$$

So the revenue maximizing quantity for the monopoly is 12.5 units and the revenue-maximizing price is 25.

A company with a monopoly does not experience price pressure from competitors, although it may experience pricing pressure from potential competition. If a company increases prices too much, then others may enter the market if they are able to provide the same good, or a substitute, at a lesser price. The idea that monopolies in markets with easy entry need not be regulated against is known as the "revolution in monopoly theory".

A monopolist can extract only one premium, and getting into complementary markets does not pay. That is, the total profits a monopolist could earn if it sought to leverage its monopoly in one market by monopolizing a complementary market are equal to the extra profits it could earn anyway by charging more for the monopoly product itself. However, the one monopoly profit theorem is not true if customers in the monopoly good are stranded or poorly informed, or if the tied good has high fixed costs.

A pure monopoly has the same economic rationality of perfectly competitive companies, i.e. to optimise a profit function given some constraints. By the assumptions of increasing marginal costs, exogenous inputs' prices, and control concentrated on a single agent or entrepreneur, the optimal decision is to equate the marginal cost and marginal revenue of production. Nonetheless, a pure monopoly can – unlike a competitive company – alter the market price for its own convenience: a decrease of production results in a higher price. In the economics' jargon, it is said that pure monopolies have "a downward-sloping demand". An important consequence of such behaviour is that typically a monopoly selects a higher price and lesser quantity of output than a price-taking company; again, less is available at a higher price.

== Inverse elasticity rule ==
A monopoly chooses that price that maximizes the difference between total revenue and total cost. The basic markup rule (as measured by the Lerner index) can be expressed as $\frac{P - MC}{P} = \frac{-1}{E_d}$, where $E_d$ is the price elasticity of demand the firm faces. The markup rules indicate that the ratio between profit margin and the price is inversely proportional to the price elasticity of demand. The implication of the rule is that the more elastic the demand for the product the less pricing power the monopoly has.

=== Market power ===
Market power is the ability to increase the product's price above marginal cost without losing all customers because of the lack of competition. Perfectly competitive (PC) companies have zero market power when it comes to setting prices. All companies of a PC market are price takers. The price is set by the interaction of demand and supply at the market or aggregate level. Individual companies simply take the price determined by the market and produce that quantity of output that maximizes the company's profits. If a PC company attempted to increase prices above the market level all its customers would abandon the company and purchase at the market price from other companies. A monopoly has considerable although not unlimited market power. A monopoly has the power to set prices or quantities although not both. A monopoly is a price maker. The monopoly is the market and prices are set by the monopolist based on their circumstances and not the interaction of demand and supply. The two primary factors determining monopoly market power are the company's demand curve and its cost structure.

Market power is the ability to affect the terms and conditions of exchange so that the price of a product is set by a single company (price is not imposed by the market as in perfect competition). Although a monopoly's market power is great it is still limited by the demand side of the market. A monopoly has a negatively sloped demand curve, not a perfectly inelastic curve. Consequently, any price increase will result in the loss of some customers.

== Price discrimination ==
Price discrimination allows a monopolist to increase its profit by charging higher prices for identical goods to those who are willing or able to pay more. For example, most economic textbooks cost more in the United States than in developing countries like Ethiopia. In this case, the publisher is using its government-granted copyright monopoly to price discriminate between the generally wealthier American economics students and the generally poorer Ethiopian economics students. Similarly, most patented medications cost more in the U.S. than in other countries with a (presumed) poorer customer base. Typically, a high general price is listed, and various market segments get varying discounts. This is an example of framing to make the process of charging some people higher prices more socially acceptable. Perfect price discrimination would allow the monopolist to charge each customer the exact maximum amount they would be willing to pay. This would allow the monopolist to extract all the consumer surplus of the market. A domestic example would be the cost of airplane flights in relation to their takeoff time; the closer they are to flight, the higher the plane tickets will cost, discriminating against late planners and often business flyers. While such perfect price discrimination is a theoretical construct, advances in information technology and micromarketing may bring it closer to the realm of possibility.

Partial price discrimination can cause some customers who are inappropriately pooled with high price customers to be excluded from the market. For example, a poor student in the U.S. might be excluded from purchasing an economics textbook at the U.S. price, which the student may have been able to purchase at the Ethiopian price. Similarly, a wealthy student in Ethiopia may be able to or willing to buy at the U.S. price, though naturally would hide such a fact from the monopolist so as to pay the reduced third world price. These are deadweight losses and decrease a monopolist's profits. Deadweight loss is considered detrimental to society and market participation. As such, monopolists have substantial economic interest in improving their market information and market segmenting.

There is important information for one to remember when considering the monopoly model diagram (and its associated conclusions) displayed here. The result that monopoly prices are higher, and production output lesser, than a competitive company follow from a requirement that the monopoly not charge different prices for different customers. That is, the monopoly is restricted from engaging in price discrimination (this is termed first degree price discrimination, such that all customers are charged the same amount). If the monopoly were permitted to charge individualised prices (this is termed third degree price discrimination), the quantity produced, and the price charged to the marginal customer, would be identical to that of a competitive company, thus eliminating the deadweight loss; however, all gains from trade (social welfare) would accrue to the monopolist and none to the consumer.

As long as the price elasticity of demand for most customers is less than one in absolute value, it is advantageous for a company to increase its prices: it receives more money for fewer goods. With a price increase, price elasticity tends to increase, and in the optimum case above it will be greater than one for most customers.

A company maximizes profit by selling where marginal revenue equals marginal cost. A company that does not engage in price discrimination will charge the profit maximizing price, $P^*$, to all its customers. In such circumstances there are customers who would be willing to pay a higher price than $P^*$ and those who will not pay $P^*$ but would buy at a lower price. A price discrimination strategy is to charge less price sensitive buyers a higher price and the more price sensitive buyers a lower price. Thus additional revenue is generated from two sources. The basic problem is to identify customers by their willingness to pay.

The purpose of price discrimination is to transfer consumer surplus to the producer. Consumer surplus is the difference between the value of a good to a consumer and the price the consumer must pay in the market to purchase it. Price discrimination is not limited to monopolies.

Market power is a company's ability to increase prices without losing all its customers. Any company that has market power can engage in price discrimination. Perfect competition is the only market form in which price discrimination would be impossible (a perfectly competitive company has a perfectly elastic demand curve and has no market power).

There are three forms of price discrimination. First degree price discrimination charges each consumer the maximum price the consumer is willing to pay. Second degree price discrimination involves quantity discounts. Third degree price discrimination involves grouping consumers according to willingness to pay as measured by their price elasticities of demand and charging each group a different price. Third degree price discrimination is the most prevalent type.

There are three conditions that must be present for a company to engage in successful price discrimination. First, the company must have market power. Second, the company must be able to sort customers according to their willingness to pay for the good. Third, the firm must be able to prevent resell.

A company must have some degree of market power to practice price discrimination. Without market power a company cannot charge more than the market price. Any market structure characterized by a downward sloping demand curve has market power – monopoly, monopolistic competition and oligopoly. The only market structure that has no market power is perfect competition.

A company wishing to practice price discrimination must be able to prevent middlemen or brokers from acquiring the consumer surplus for themselves. The company accomplishes this by preventing or limiting resale. Many methods are used to prevent resale. For instance, persons are required to show photographic identification and a boarding pass before boarding an airplane. Most travelers assume that this practice is strictly a matter of security. However, a primary purpose in requesting photographic identification is to confirm that the ticket purchaser is the person about to board the airplane and not someone who has repurchased the ticket from a discount buyer.

The inability to prevent resale is the largest obstacle to successful price discrimination. Companies have, however, developed numerous methods to prevent resale. For example, universities require that students show identification before entering sporting events. Governments may make it illegal to resell tickets or products. In Boston, Red Sox baseball tickets can only be resold legally to the team.

The three basic forms of price discrimination are first, second and third degree price discrimination. In first degree price discrimination the company charges the maximum price each customer is willing to pay. The maximum price a consumer is willing to pay for a unit of the good is the reservation price. Thus for each unit the seller tries to set the price equal to the consumer's reservation price. Direct information about a consumer's willingness to pay is rarely available. Sellers tend to rely on secondary information such as where a person lives (postal codes); for example, catalog retailers can use mail high-priced catalogs to high-income postal codes. First degree price discrimination most frequently occurs in regard to professional services or in transactions involving direct buyer-seller negotiations. For example, an accountant who has prepared a consumer's tax return has information that can be used to charge customers based on an estimate of their ability to pay. (Note: If the monopolist is able to segment the market perfectly, then the average revenue curve effectively becomes the marginal revenue curve for the company and the company maximizes profits by equating price and marginal costs. That is the company is behaving like a perfectly competitive company. The monopolist will continue to sell extra units as long as the extra revenue exceeds the marginal cost of production. The problem that the company has is that the company must charge a different price for each successive unit sold.)

In second degree price discrimination or quantity discrimination customers are charged different prices based on how much they buy. There is a single price schedule for all consumers but the prices vary depending on the quantity of the good bought. The theory of second degree price discrimination is a consumer is willing to buy only a certain quantity of a good at a given price. Companies know that consumer's willingness to buy decreases as more units are purchased. The task for the seller is to identify these price points and to reduce the price once one is reached in the hope that a reduced price will trigger additional purchases from the consumer. For example, sell in unit blocks rather than individual units.

In third degree price discrimination or multi-market price discrimination the seller divides the consumers into different groups according to their willingness to pay as measured by their price elasticity of demand. Each group of consumers effectively becomes a separate market with its own demand curve and marginal revenue curve. The firm then attempts to maximize profits in each segment by equating MR and MC, Generally the company charges a higher price to the group with a more price inelastic demand and a relatively lesser price to the group with a more elastic demand. Examples of third degree price discrimination abound. Airlines charge higher prices to business travelers than to vacation travelers. The reasoning is that the demand curve for a vacation traveler is relatively elastic while the demand curve for a business traveler is relatively inelastic. Any determinant of price elasticity of demand can be used to segment markets. For example, seniors have a more elastic demand for movies than do young adults because they generally have more free time. Thus theaters will offer discount tickets to seniors. (Note: Note that the discounts apply only to tickets not to concessions. The reason there is not any popcorn discount is that there is not any effective way to prevent resell. A profit maximizing theater owner maximizes concession sales by selling where marginal revenue equals marginal cost.)

=== Example ===
Assume that by a uniform pricing system the monopolist would sell five units at a price of $10 per unit. Assume that his marginal cost is $5 per unit. Total revenue would be $50, total costs would be $25 and profits would be $25. If the monopolist practiced price discrimination he would sell the first unit for $17 the second unit for $14 and so on which is listed in the table below. Total revenue would be $55, his total cost would be $25 and his profit would be $30. Several things are worth noting. The monopolist acquires all the consumer surplus and eliminates practically all the deadweight loss because he is willing to sell to anyone who is willing to pay at least the marginal cost. Thus the price discrimination promotes efficiency. Secondly, by the pricing scheme price = average revenue and equals marginal revenue. That is the monopolist behaving like a perfectly competitive company. Thirdly, the discriminating monopolist produces a larger quantity than the monopolist operating by a uniform pricing scheme.

Qd	Price
1	$17
2	$14
3	$11
4	$8
5	$5

=== Classifying customers ===
Successful price discrimination requires that companies separate consumers according to their willingness to buy. Determining a customer's willingness to buy a good is difficult. Asking consumers directly is fruitless: consumers do not know, and to the extent they do they are reluctant to share that information with marketers. The two main methods for determining willingness to buy are observation of personal characteristics and consumer actions. As noted information about where a person lives (postal codes), how the person dresses, what kind of car he or she drives, occupation, and income and spending patterns can be helpful in classifying.

== Monopoly and efficiency ==
In a competitive market, everything above the horizontal line at Pc would be consumer surplus, and everything below, producer surplus. The monopolist pushes up the price (from Pc to Pm), reducing consumption (from Qc to Qm) but capturing some of the consumer surplus. The remaining consumer surplus is shown in red; the enlarged producer surplus in blue. But increasing the price means price-sensitive consumers do not buy, causing a deadweight loss (in yellow). Since the yellow area below line Pc (what the monopolist loses from lower sales) is smaller than the blue area above line Pc (what the monopolist gains from higher prices), the monopolist has a net gain, but society has a net loss; economic efficiency decreases.

The price of monopoly is upon every occasion the highest which can be got. The natural price, or the price of free competition, on the contrary, is the lowest which can be taken, not upon every occasion indeed, but for any considerable time together. The one is upon every occasion the highest which can be squeezed out of the buyers, or which it is supposed they will consent to give; the other is the lowest which the sellers can commonly afford to take, and at the same time continue their business.

...Monopoly, besides, is a great enemy to good management.

– Adam Smith (1776), The Wealth of Nations

According to the standard model, in which a monopolist sets a single price for all consumers, the monopolist will sell a lesser quantity of goods at a higher price than would companies by perfect competition. Because the monopolist ultimately forgoes transactions with consumers who value the product or service less than its price, monopoly pricing creates a deadweight loss referring to potential gains that went neither to the monopolist nor to consumers. Deadweight loss is the cost to society because it is inefficient. Given the presence of this deadweight loss, the combined surplus (or wealth) for the monopolist and consumers is necessarily less than the total surplus obtained by consumers by perfect competition. Where efficiency is defined by the total gains from trade, the monopoly setting is less efficient than perfect competition.

It is often argued that monopolies tend to become less efficient and less innovative over time, becoming "complacent", because they do not have to be efficient or innovative to compete in the marketplace. Sometimes this very loss of psychological efficiency can increase a potential competitor's value enough to overcome market entry barriers, or provide incentive for research and investment into new alternatives. The theory of contestable markets argues that in some circumstances (private) monopolies are forced to behave as if there were competition because of the risk of losing their monopoly to new entrants. This is likely to happen when a market's barriers to entry are low. It might also be because of the availability in the longer term of substitutes in other markets. For example, a canal monopoly, while worth a great deal during the late 18th century United Kingdom, was worth much less during the late 19th century because of the introduction of railways as a substitute.

Contrary to common misconception, monopolists do not try to sell items for the highest possible price, nor do they try to maximize profit per unit, but rather they try to maximize total profit.

=== Natural monopoly ===
A natural monopoly is an organization that experiences increasing returns to scale over the relevant range of output and relatively high fixed costs. A natural monopoly occurs where the average cost of production "declines throughout the relevant range of product demand". The relevant range of product demand is where the average cost curve is below the demand curve. When this situation occurs, it is always more efficient for one large company to supply the market than multiple smaller companies; in fact, absent government intervention in such markets, will naturally evolve into a monopoly. Often, a natural monopoly is the outcome of an initial rivalry between several competitors. An early market entrant that takes advantage of the cost structure and can expand rapidly can exclude smaller companies from entering and can drive or buy out other companies. A natural monopoly suffers from the same inefficiencies as any other monopoly. Left to its own devices, a profit-seeking natural monopoly will produce where marginal revenue equals marginal costs. Regulation of natural monopolies is problematic. Fragmenting such monopolies is by definition inefficient. The most frequently used methods dealing with natural monopolies are government regulations and public ownership. Government regulation generally consists of regulatory commissions charged with the principal duty of setting prices. Natural monopolies are synonymous with what is called "single-unit enterprise", a term which was used in the 1914 book Social Economics written by Friedrich von Wieser. As mentioned, government regulations are frequently used with natural monopolies to help control prices. An example that can illustrate this can be found when looking at the United States Postal Service, which has a monopoly over types of mail. According to Wieser, the idea of a competitive market within the postal industry would lead to extreme prices and unnecessary spending, and this highlighted why government regulation in the form of price control is necessary as it helped efficient market.

To reduce prices and increase output, regulators often use average cost pricing. By average cost pricing, the price and quantity are determined by the intersection of the average cost curve and the demand curve. This pricing scheme eliminates any positive economic profits since price equals average cost. Average-cost pricing is not perfect. Regulators must estimate average costs. Companies have a reduced incentive to lower costs. Regulation of this type has not been limited to natural monopolies. Average-cost pricing does also have some disadvantages. By setting price equal to the intersection of the demand curve and the average total cost curve, the firm's output is allocatively inefficient as the price is less than the marginal cost (which is the output quantity for a perfectly competitive and allocatively efficient market).

In 1848, J.S. Mill was the first individual to describe monopolies with the adjective "natural". He used it interchangeably with "practical". At the time, Mill gave the following examples of natural or practical monopolies: gas supply, water supply, roads, canals, and railways. In his Social Economics, Friedrich von Wieser demonstrated his view of the postal service as a natural monopoly: "In the face of [such] single-unit administration, the principle of competition becomes utterly abortive. The parallel network of another postal organization, beside the one already functioning, would be economically absurd; enormous amounts of money for plant and management would have to be expended for no purpose whatever." Overall, most monopolies are man-made monopolies, or unnatural monopolies, not natural ones.

=== Government-granted monopoly ===
A government-granted monopoly (also called a "de jure monopoly") is a form of coercive monopoly, in which a government grants exclusive privilege to a private individual or company to be the sole provider of a commodity. Monopoly may be granted explicitly, as when potential competitors are excluded from the market by a specific law, or implicitly, such as when the requirements of an administrative regulation can only be fulfilled by a single market player, or through some other legal or procedural mechanism, such as patents, trademarks, and copyright. These monopolies can also be the result of "rent-seeking" behavior, where firms will try to get the prize of having a monopoly, and the increase of profits in acquiring one from a competitive market in their sector.

=== Monopolist shutdown rule ===
A monopolist should (assuming they want to earn money) shut down when price is less than average variable cost for every output level – in other words where the demand curve is entirely below the average variable cost curve. Under these circumstances at the profit maximum level of output (MR = MC) average revenue would be less than average variable costs and the monopolists would be better off shutting down in the short term.

== Mitigation ==
When a company is determined to be monopolistic, steps to mitigate the monopolistic behavior include governments extracting monopoly profits, forcibly fragmenting the monopoly and changing regulations to hinder anti-competitive practices. Excess profits taxes can stop monopoly profits and incentivize entry of new competitors. In case of natural monopolies like public utilities, one operator is often more efficient and therefore less susceptible to efficient breakup, strong regulation can prevent monopoly profits.

Examples of the breakup of a private monopoly by government often cited are American Telephone & Telegraph (AT&T) and Standard Oil. The Bell System, later AT&T, was protected from competition first by the Kingsbury Commitment, and later by a series of agreements between AT&T and the Federal Government. In 1984, decades after having been granted monopoly power by force of law, AT&T was broken up into various components, MCI, Sprint, who were able to compete effectively in the long-distance phone market. While some have been against breakups as remedies for antitrust enforcement, recent scholarship has found that this hostility to breakups by administrators is largely unwarranted. In fact, some scholars have argued that breakups, even if incorrectly targeted, could still encourage collaboration, innovation, and efficiency. Regulatory or enforcement changes to stop anti-competitive practices vary depending on the type of anti-competitive practices, one example is local-loop unbundling.

== Law ==
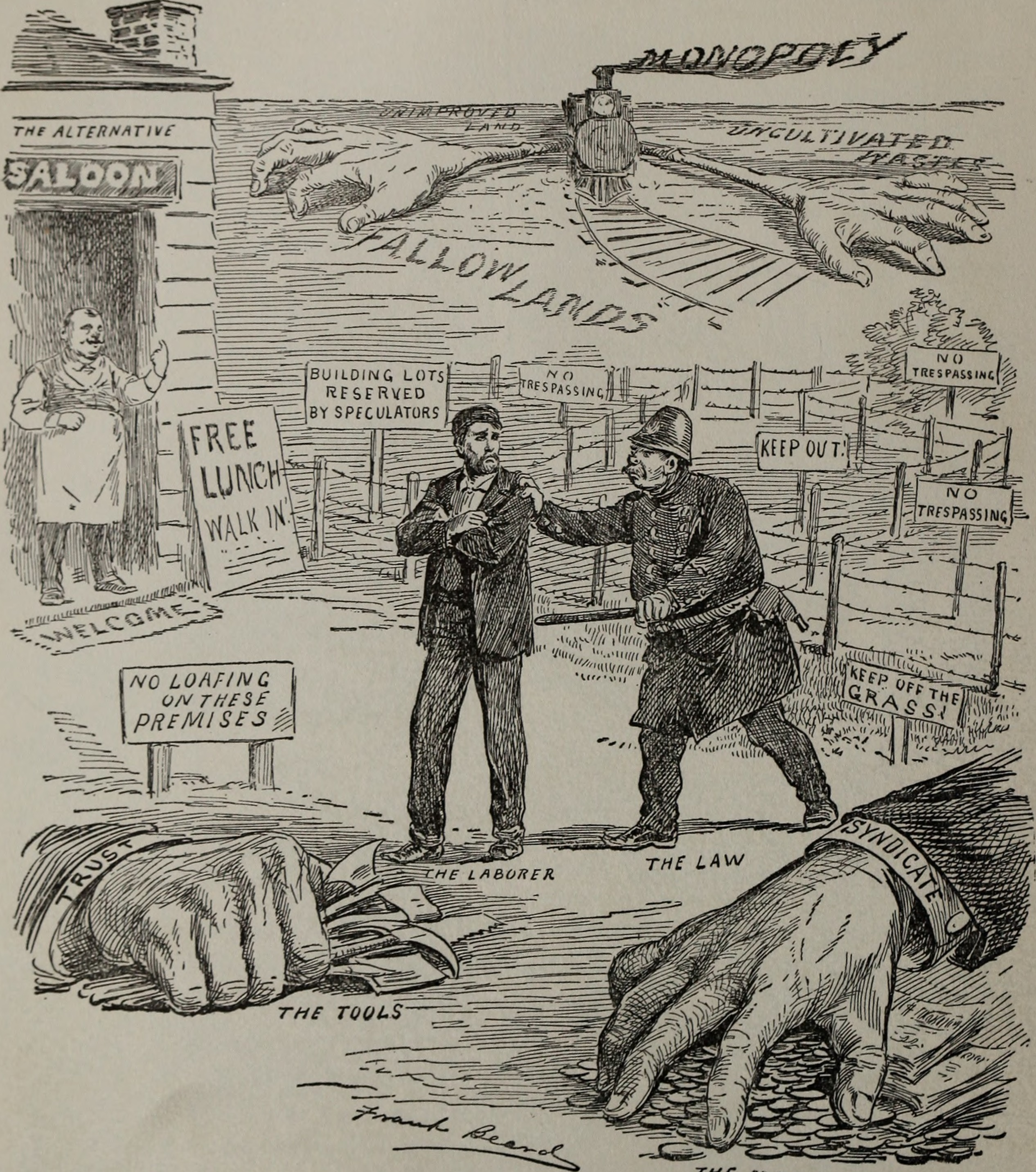
A 1902 anti-monopoly cartoon depicts the challenges that monopolies may create for workers.

"Corporations are creatures of the State, and the public safety requires that their conduct and functions shall be always controlled by their creator. They must be not only subordinated to the laws to which natural persons must bow, but they must be compelled to serve the public purposes for which they are created, and for which alone they should be permitted to live. Monopoly is bad enough in private hands, but it is a menace to all human rights when entrusted to artificial monsters uncontrolled by law and incapable of moral restraint."

— Future Congressman James G. Maguire in a speech given during the 1880 United States presidential election

The law regulating dominance in the European Union is governed by Article 102 of the Treaty on the Functioning of the European Union which aims at enhancing the consumer's welfare and also the efficiency of allocation of resources by protecting competition on the downstream market. The existence of a very high market share does not always mean consumers are paying excessive prices, since the threat of new entrants to the market can restrain a high-market-share company's price increases. Competition law does not make merely having a monopoly illegal but rather abusing the power a monopoly may confer, for instance, through exclusionary practices (i.e., pricing high just because it is the only one around). It should also be noted that it is illegal to try to obtain a monopoly through practices like buying out the competition or similar methods. If a monopoly occurs naturally, such as a competitor going out of business or a lack of competition, it is not illegal until the monopoly holder abuses their power.

=== Establishing dominance ===
First, it is necessary to determine whether a company is dominant, or whether it behaves “to an appreciable extent independently of its competitors, customers, and ultimately its consumers.” Establishing dominance is a two-stage test. The first thing to consider is market definition, which is one of the crucial factors of the test. This includes the relevant product market and the relevant geographic market.

==== Relevant product market ====
As the definition of the market is of a matter of interchangeability, if the goods or services are regarded as interchangeable then they are within the same product market. For example, in the case of United Brands v Commission, it was argued in this case that bananas and other fresh fruit were in the same product market and later on dominance was found because the special features of the banana made it could only be interchangeable with other fresh fruits in a limited extent and other and is only exposed to their competition in a way that is hardly perceptible. The demand substitutability of the goods and services will help in defining the product market and it can be access by the 'hypothetical monopolist' test or the 'SSNIP' test.

==== Relevant geographic market ====
It is necessary to define it because some goods can only be supplied within a narrow area due to technical, practical or legal reasons and this may help to indicate which undertakings impose a competitive constraint on the other undertakings in question. Since some goods are too expensive to transport where it might not be economic to sell them to distant markets in relation to their value, therefore the cost of transporting is a crucial factor here. Other factors might be legal controls which restricts an undertaking in a Member States from exporting goods or services to another.

Market definition may be difficult to measure but is important because if it is defined too narrowly, the undertaking may be more likely to be found dominant and if it is defined too broadly, the less likely that it will be found dominant.

==== Market shares ====
As with collusive conduct, market shares are determined with reference to the particular market in which the company and product in question is sold. It does not in itself determine whether an undertaking is dominant but work as an indicator of the states of the existing competition within the market. The Herfindahl–Hirschman Index (HHI) is sometimes used to assess how competitive an industry is. It sums up the squares of the individual market shares of all of the competitors within the market. The lower the total, the less concentrated the market and the higher the total, the more concentrated the market. In the US, the merger guidelines state that a post-merger HHI below 1000 is viewed as not concentrated while HHIs above that will provoke further review.

Under European Union law, very large market shares raise a presumption that a company is dominant, which may be rebuttable. A market share of 100% may be very rare but it is still possible to be found and in fact it has been identified in some cases, for instance the AAMS v Commission case. Undertakings possessing market share that is lower than 100% but over 90% had also been found dominant, for example, Microsoft v Commission case. In the AKZO v Commission case, the undertaking is presumed to be dominant if it has a market share of 50%. There are also findings of dominance that are below a market share of 50%, for instance, United Brands v Commission, it only possessed a market share of 40% to 45% and still to be found dominant with other factors. The lowest yet market share of a company considered "dominant" in the EU was 39.7%. If a company has a dominant position, then there is a special responsibility not to allow its conduct to impair competition on the common market; however, these will all falls away if it is not dominant.

When considering whether an undertaking is dominant, it involves a combination of factors. Each of them cannot be taken separately as if they are, they will not be as determinative as they are when they are combined. Also, in cases where an undertaking has previously been found dominant, it is still necessary to redefine the market and make a whole new analysis of the conditions of competition based on the available evidence at the appropriate time.

==== Other related factors ====
According to guidance on Article 102 enforcement priorities, there are three more issues that must be examined. They are actual competitors that relates to the market position of the dominant undertaking and its competitors, potential competitors that concerns the expansion and entry and lastly the countervailing buyer power.

- Actual Competitors

Market share may be a valuable source of information regarding the market structure and the market position when it comes to accessing it. The dynamics of the market and the extent to which the goods and services differentiated are relevant in this area.

- Potential Competitors

It concerns with the competition that would come from other undertakings which are not yet operating in the market but will enter it in the future. So, market shares may not be useful in accessing the competitive pressure that is exerted on an undertaking in this area. The potential entry by new firms and expansions by an undertaking must be taken into account, therefore the barriers to entry and barriers to expansion is an important factor here.

- Countervailing buyer power

Competitive constraints may not always come from actual or potential competitors. Sometimes, it may also come from powerful customers who have sufficient bargaining strength which come from its size or its commercial significance for a dominant firm.

=== Types of abuses ===
There are three main types of abuses which are exploitative abuse, exclusionary abuse and single market abuse.

- Exploitative abuse

It arises when a monopolist has such significant market power that it can restrict its output while increasing the price above the competitive level without losing customers. This type is less concerned by the Commission than other types.

- Exclusionary abuse

This is most concerned about by the Commissions because it is capable of causing long-term consumer damage and is more likely to prevent the development of competition. An example of it is exclusive dealing agreements.

- Single market abuse

It arises when a dominant undertaking carrying out excess pricing which would not only have an exploitative effect but also prevent parallel imports and limits intra-brand competition.

=== Examples of abuses ===
- Limiting supply
- Predatory pricing or undercutting
- Price discrimination
- Refusal to deal and exclusive dealing
- Tying (commerce) and product bundling

Despite wide agreement that the above constitute abusive practices, there is some debate about whether there needs to be a causal connection between the dominant position of a company and its actual abusive conduct. Furthermore, there has been some consideration of what happens when a company merely attempts to abuse its dominant position.

To provide a more specific example, economic and philosophical scholar Adam Smith cites that trade to the East India Company has, for the most part, been subjected to an exclusive company such as that of the English or Dutch. Monopolies such as these are generally established against the nation in which they arose out of. The profound economist goes on to state how there are two types of monopolies. The first type of monopoly is one which tends to always attract to the particular trade where the monopoly was conceived, a greater proportion of the stock of the society than what would go to that trade originally. The second type of monopoly tends to occasionally attract stock towards the particular trade where it was conceived, and sometimes repel it from that trade depending on varying circumstances. Rich countries tended to repel while poorer countries were attracted to this. For example, The Dutch company would dispose of any excess goods not taken to the market in order to preserve their monopoly while the English sold more goods for better prices. Both of these tendencies were extremely destructive as can be seen in Adam Smith's writings.

== Historical monopolies ==
=== Origin ===
The term "monopoly" first appears in Aristotle's Politics. Aristotle describes Thales of Miletus's cornering of the market in olive presses as a monopoly (μονοπώλιον). Another early reference to the concept of "monopoly" in a commercial sense appears in tractate Demai of the Mishna (2nd century CE), regarding the purchasing of agricultural goods from a dealer who has a monopoly on the produce (chapter 5; 4). The meaning and understanding of the English word 'monopoly' has changed over the years.

=== Monopolies of resources ===
==== Salt ====
Vending of common salt (sodium chloride) was historically a natural monopoly. Until recently, a combination of strong sunshine and low humidity or an extension of peat marshes was necessary for producing salt from the sea, the most plentiful source. Changing sea levels periodically caused salt "famines" and communities were forced to depend upon those who controlled the scarce inland mines and salt springs, which were often in hostile areas (e.g. the Sahara) requiring well-organised security for transport, storage, and distribution.

The Salt Commission was a legal monopoly in China. Formed in 758, the commission controlled salt production and sales in order to raise tax revenue for the Tang dynasty.

The "Gabelle" was a notoriously high tax levied upon salt in the Kingdom of France. The much-hated levy had a role in the beginning of the French Revolution, when strict legal controls specified who was allowed to sell and distribute salt. First instituted in 1286, the Gabelle was not permanently abolished until 1945.

==== Coal ====
Robin Gollan argues in The Coalminers of New South Wales that anti-competitive practices developed in the coal industry of Australia's Newcastle as a result of the business cycle. The monopoly was generated by formal meetings of the local management of coal companies agreeing to fix a minimum price for sale at dock. This collusion was known as "The Vend". The Vend ended and was reformed repeatedly during the late 19th century, ending by recession in the business cycle. "The Vend" was able to maintain its monopoly due to trade union assistance, and material advantages (primarily coal geography). During the early 20th century, as a result of comparable monopolistic practices in the Australian coastal shipping business, the Vend developed as an informal and illegal collusion between the steamship owners and the coal industry, eventually resulting in the High Court case Adelaide Steamship Co. Ltd v. R. & AG.

==== Persian filoselle (raw silk) ====
In the 17th century, Shah Abbas established New Julfa (a suburb in the capital of Isfahan) to concentrate Armenian financial capital in Iran. Accordingly, he gave Armenians various privileges, including the monopoly to trade Persian filoselle (raw silk). Armenians exported it all over the world, including Asia, Europe, and America. By the 1750s, Armenia already controlled 75% of the total silk trade in the area. This resulted in a boom in Armenian commerce, which lasted for the next 150 years. At present, as it happens, Armenia's own economy is itself highly monopolized; in fact, with 19% of its economy monopolized, Armenia was the most monopolized country in Eastern Europe and Central Asia in 2009.

==== Petroleum ====
Standard Oil was an American oil producing, transporting, refining, and marketing company. Established in 1870, it became the largest oil refiner in the world. John D. Rockefeller was a founder, chairman and major shareholder. The company was an innovator in the development of the business trust. The Standard Oil trust streamlined production and logistics, lowered costs, and undercut competitors. "Trust-busting" critics accused Standard Oil of using aggressive pricing to destroy competitors and form a monopoly that threatened consumers. Its controversial history as one of the world's first and largest multinational corporations ended in 1911, when the United States Supreme Court ruled that Standard was an illegal monopoly. The Standard Oil trust was dissolved into 33 smaller companies; two of its surviving "child" companies are ExxonMobil and the Chevron Corporation.

==== Steel ====
U.S. Steel has been accused of being a monopoly. J. P. Morgan and Elbert H. Gary founded U.S. Steel in 1901 by combining Andrew Carnegie's Carnegie Steel Company with Gary's Federal Steel Company and William Henry "Judge" Moore's National Steel Company. At one time, U.S. Steel was the largest steel producer and largest corporation in the world. In its first full year of operation, U.S. Steel made 67 percent of all the steel produced in the United States. However, U.S. Steel's share of the expanding market slipped to 50 percent by 1911, and antitrust prosecution that year failed.

==== Diamonds ====
De Beers settled charges of price-fixing in the diamond trade in the 2000s. De Beers is well known for its monopoloid practices throughout the 20th century, whereby it used its dominant position to manipulate the international diamond market. The company used several methods to exercise this control over the market. Firstly, it convinced independent producers to join its single channel monopoly, it flooded the market with diamonds similar to those of producers who refused to join the cartel, and lastly, it purchased and stockpiled diamonds produced by other manufacturers in order to control prices through limiting supply.

In 2000, the De Beers business model changed due to factors such as the decision by producers in Russia, Canada and Australia to distribute diamonds outside the De Beers channel, as well as rising awareness of blood diamonds that forced De Beers to "avoid the risk of bad publicity" by limiting sales to its own mined products. De Beers' market share by value fell from as high as 90% in the 1980s to less than 40% in 2012, having resulted in a more fragmented diamond market with more transparency and greater liquidity.

In November 2011, the Oppenheimer family announced its intention to sell the entirety of its 40% stake in De Beers to Anglo American plc thereby increasing Anglo American's ownership of the company to 85%.[30] The transaction was worth £3.2 billion ($5.1 billion) in cash and ended the Oppenheimer dynasty's 80-year ownership of De Beers.

=== Utilities ===
A public utility (or simply "utility") is an organization or company that maintains the infrastructure for a public service or provides a set of services for public consumption. Common examples of utilities are electricity, natural gas, water, sewage, cable television, and telephone. In the United States, public utilities are often natural monopolies because the infrastructure required to produce and deliver a product such as electricity or water is very expensive to build and maintain.

Western Union was criticized as a "price gouging" monopoly in the late 19th century. American Telephone & Telegraph was a telecommunications giant. AT&T was broken up in 1984. In the case of Telecom New Zealand, local loop unbundling was enforced by central government.

Telkom is a semi-privatised, part state-owned South African telecommunications company. Deutsche Telekom is a former state monopoly, still partially state owned. Deutsche Telekom currently monopolizes high-speed VDSL broadband network. The Long Island Power Authority (LIPA) provided electric service to over 1.1 million customers in Nassau and Suffolk counties of New York, and the Rockaway Peninsula in Queens.

The Comcast Corporation is the largest mass media and communications company in the world by revenue. It is the largest cable company and home Internet service provider in the United States, and the nation's third largest home telephone service provider. Comcast has a monopoly in Boston, Philadelphia, and many small towns across the US.

=== Transportation ===
The United Aircraft and Transport Corporation was an aircraft manufacturer holding company that was forced to divest itself of airlines in 1934.

Iarnród Éireann, the Irish Railway authority, is a current monopoly as Ireland does not have the size for more companies.

The Long Island Rail Road (LIRR) was founded in 1834, and since the mid-1800s has provided train service between Long Island and New York City. In the 1870s, LIRR became the sole railroad in that area through a series of acquisitions and consolidations. In 2013, the LIRR's commuter rail system is the busiest commuter railroad in North America, serving nearly 335,000 passengers daily.

=== Foreign trade ===
Dutch East India Company was created as a legal trading monopoly in 1602. The Vereenigde Oost-Indische Compagnie enjoyed huge profits from its spice monopoly through most of the 17th century.

The British East India Company was created as a legal trading monopoly in 1600. The East India Company was formed for pursuing trade with the East Indies but ended up trading mainly with the Indian subcontinent, North-West Frontier Province, and Balochistan. The Company traded in basic commodities, which included cotton, silk, indigo dye, salt, saltpetre, tea and opium.

=== Professional sports ===
==== Baseball ====
In 1922, the US Supreme Court ruled in Federal Baseball Club v. National League that baseball was not the kind of commerce intended to be affected by federal antitrust, thus making baseball exempt from antitrust laws. The Supreme Court maintained their original ruling in both 1953 and 1972 when the issue was brought up in court. As a legal monopoly, the MLB has not had any competition in the American market since the early 1960s, from the defunct Continental League.

==== American Football ====
After mergers in 1949 with the AAFC and 1970 with the AFL, the National Football League was facing competition from the USFL following their successful first season in 1983. The USFL initially operated as a spring league, beginning their season approximately one month after the NFL season had concluded and would finish the season approximately one month prior to the start of NFL preseason games. With an increasing popularity and ability to sign big names, such as the 1982-84 Heisman Trophy winners Herschel Walker, Mike Rozier and Doug Flutie, the New Jersey Generals owner Donald Trump persuaded other owners to move the season so it directly competed with the NFL's. At the same time an antitrust lawsuit was filed against the NFL as it convinced the 3 major American television channels against broadcasting any USFL games. The trial lasted 42 days and the jury found the NFL has indeed acted monopolistically and violated antitrust laws but as the NFL was not directly responsible for the financial difficulties of the league, the USFL was awarded $1 in damages, which was tripled to $3 due to it being an antitrust case. The USFL announced it would forego the 1986 altogether to appeal the decision; however, the league would fold within a week of the trial ending. The US Supreme Court would, four years later, allow the original ruling to stand and order the NFL to pay damages and to include interest, bringing the total to $3.76. The NFL did previously survive an antitrust lawsuit in the 1960s.

=== Examples of possible/potential monopolies ===
- Microsoft has been the defendant in multiple antitrust suits on strategy embrace, extend and extinguish. They settled antitrust litigation in the U.S. in 2001. In 2004 Microsoft was fined 493 million euros by the European Commission which was upheld for the most part by the Court of First Instance of the European Communities in 2007. The fine was US$1.35 billion in 2008 for noncompliance with the 2004 rule.
- Monsanto has been sued by competitors for antitrust and monopolistic practices. They have between 70% and 100% of the commercial GMO seed market in a small number of crops.
- AAFES has a monopoly on retail sales at overseas U.S. military installations.
- The State retail alcohol monopolies of Norway (Vinmonopolet), Sweden (Systembolaget), Finland (Alko), Iceland (Vínbúð), Ontario (LCBO), Quebec (SAQ), British Columbia (Liquor Distribution Branch), among others.
- The Walt Disney Company is one of the largest mass media and entertainment conglomerates in the world, and has acquired huge amounts of assets, companies and corporations – both national and international. The 2019 purchase of the majority of 20th Century Fox's assets sparked controversy.

== See also ==
- Bilateral monopoly
- Complementary monopoly
- Conflict theories
- De facto standard
- Demonopolization
- Dominant design
- Flag carrier
- History of monopoly
- Market segmentation index, used to measure the degree of monopoly power
- Megacorporation
- Monopsony
- Ramsey problem, a policy rule concerning what price a monopolist should set.
- Simulations and games in economics education that model monopolistic markets.
- State monopoly capitalism
- Trust (business)
- Unfair competition
