= Coercive monopoly =

Type of monopoly

In economics and business ethics, a coercive monopoly is a firm, that is able to raise prices and make production decisions without the risk that competition will arise to draw away their customers. A coercive monopoly is not merely a sole supplier of a particular kind of good or service (a monopoly), but it is a monopoly, where there is no opportunity to compete with it through means such as price competition, technological or product innovation, or marketing; entry into the field is closed. As a coercive monopoly is securely shielded from the possibility of competition, it is able to make pricing and production decisions with the assurance that no competition will arise. It is a case of a non-contestable market. A coercive monopoly has very few incentives to keep prices low and may deliberately price gouge consumers by curtailing production.

Coercive monopolies can arise in free market or via government intervention to institute them. Some conservative think tanks, such as the Foundation for Economic Education, define coercive monopolies solely as those established by the government or via the illegal use of force, excluding monopolies that arise in the free market.

== Contrasted with other monopolies ==
Exclusive control of electricity supply due to government-imposed "utility" status is a coercive monopoly because consumers have no choice but to pay the price that the monopolist demands. Consumers do not have an alternative to purchase electricity from a cheaper competitor, because the wires running into their homes belong to the monopolist.

Exclusive control of Coca-Cola, by contrast, is not a coercive monopoly because consumers have other cola brands to choose from and the Coca-Cola company is subject to competitive forces. Consequently, there is an upper limit to which the company can raise its prices before profits begin to erode because of the presence of viable substitute goods.

To maintain a non-coercive monopoly, a monopolist must make pricing and production decisions knowing that, if prices are too high or quality is too low, competition may arise from another firm that can better serve the market. If the non-coercive monopoly is successful, it is called an efficiency monopoly, because it has been able to keep production and supply costs lower than any other competitor so that it can charge a lower price than others and still be profitable. Since potential competitors are not able to be so efficient, they are not able to charge a lower or comparable price and still be profitable. Hence, competing against a non-coercive monopoly is possible but not profitable, whereas competing against a coercive monopoly is potentially profitable but not possible.

== Establishing a coercive monopoly ==
According to business ethicist John Hasnas, "most [contemporary business ethicists] take for granted that a free market produces coercive monopolies." However, some people, including Alan Greenspan and Nathaniel Branden, argue that such independence from competitive forces "can be accomplished only by an act of government intervention, in the form of special regulations, subsidies, or franchises." Some point out that a coercive monopolist may "employ violence" to create or maintain a coercive monopoly.

Some recommend that government create coercive monopolies. For example, claims of natural monopoly are often used as justification for government intervening to establish a statutory monopoly (government monopoly or government-granted monopoly) where competition is outlawed, under the claim that multiple firms providing a good or service entails more collective costs to an economy than would be the case if a single firm provided that good or service. This has often been done with electricity, water, telecommunications, and mail delivery. Some economists believe that such coercive monopolies are beneficial because of greater economies of scale and because they are more likely to act in the national interest. Conversely, Judge Richard Posner famously argued in Natural Monopoly and Its Regulation that the deadweight losses associated with regulating such monopolies were greater than any possible benefit.

== Private coercion ==
A corporation which successfully engages in coercion to the extent that it eliminates the possibility of competition operates a coercive monopoly. A firm may use illegal or non-economic methods, such as extortion, to achieve and retain a coercive monopoly position. A company which has become the sole supplier of a commodity through non-coercive means (such as by simply outcompeting all other firms) may theoretically then go on to become a coercive monopoly if it maintains its position by engaging in coercive barriers to entry. The most famous historical examples of this type of coercive monopoly began in 1920, when the Eighteenth Amendment to the United States Constitution went into effect. This period, called Prohibition, presented lucrative opportunities for organized crime to take over the importation ("bootlegging"), manufacture, and distribution of alcoholic beverages. Al Capone, one of the most famous bootleggers, built his criminal empire largely on profits from illegal alcohol and effectively used coercion (including murder) to impose barriers to entry on his competitors. However, even private coercive monopolies almost invariably require government support, whether direct or indirect. In Capone's case, the U.S. government created the necessary conditions for a coercive monopoly by outlawing the manufacture and sale of alcohol, thereby enabling unnaturally high profits on the black market, and was not providing the usual service of enforcing trade contracts. Likewise, some corrupt public officials took bribes that ensured that Capone would receive preferential treatment against potential competitors.

== Antitrust ==
The ability of firms in a coercive monopoly to increase their profits through setting prices above competitive levels brings about the need for antitrust law. There are examples in history wherein a firm that is not a government-granted monopoly is claimed to have a coercive monopoly, and antitrust action has been initiated to resolve the perceived problem. For example, in United States v. Microsoft Corp., the plaintiff's finding of fact alleged that Microsoft "coerced" Apple Computer to enter into contracts resulting in the prohibition of competition. Eric Raymond, an author and one of the founders of the Open Source Initiative, says "The thing a lot of people somehow missed is that the courts affirmed the findings of fact – that Microsoft is indeed a coercive monopoly."

Another disputed example is the case of U.S. v. Aluminum Co. of America (Alcoa) in 1945. The court concluded that Alcoa "excluded competitors." The ruling is heavily criticized for punishing efficiency and is quoted below:

It was not inevitable that it should always anticipate increases in the demand for ingot and be prepared to supply them. Nothing compelled it to keep doubling and redoubling its capacity before others entered the field. It insists that it never excluded competitors; but we can think of no more effective exclusion than progressively to embrace each new opportunity as it opened, and to face every newcomer with new capacity already geared into a great organization, having the advantage of experience, trade connections and the elite of personnel.

However, antitrust law varies across the United States and the European Union. Specifically, in the U.S. monopoly pricing is not regulated. Whereas the European Community (EC) considers excessive pricing as an abuse of dominance and those involved can be fined or subject to prohibitory orders. This difference in regulation highlights the need to level out antitrust laws across the world in order to control this exclusionary and exploitive conduct in coercive monopolies.

== Government monopolies ==
Undisputed examples of coercive monopolies are those that are enforced by law. In a government monopoly, an agency under the direct authority of the government itself holds the monopoly, and the coercive monopoly status is sustained by the enforcement of laws or regulations that ban competition, or reserve exclusive control over factors of production for the government. The state-owned petroleum companies that are common in oil-rich developing countries (such as Aramco in Saudi Arabia or PDVSA in Venezuela) are examples of government monopolies created through nationalization of resources and existing firms.

The United States Postal Service is an example of a coercive monopoly created through laws that ban potential competitors such as UPS or FedEx from offering competing services (in this case, first-class and standard (formerly called "third-class") mail delivery). (Note: Lysander Spooner started the commercially successful American Letter Mail Company in order to compete with the United States Post Office by providing lower rates. He was successfully challenged by the U.S. government and exhausted his resources trying to defend his right to compete.) Government monopolies also mandate taxpayers to subsidize these firms. Thus, if the government protection of the United States Postal Service was lifted and mail delivery could be included in free competition, the number of entrants into the industry would likely increase.

Government-granted monopolies often closely resemble government monopolies in many respects, but the two are distinguished by the decision-making structure of the monopolist. In a government monopoly, the holder of the monopoly is the government itself and the group of people who make business decisions is an agency under the government's direct authority. In a government-granted monopoly, the coercive monopoly is enforced through law, but the holder of the monopoly is formally a private firm, or a subsidiary division of a private firm, which makes its own business decisions. Examples of government-granted monopolies include cable television and water providers in many municipalities in the United States, exclusive petroleum exploration grants to companies such as Standard Oil in many countries, and historically, lucrative colonial "joint stock" companies such as the Dutch East India Company, which were granted exclusive trading privileges with colonial possessions under mercantilist economic policy. Intellectual property such as copyrights and patents are government-granted monopolies. Another example is the thirty-year government-granted monopoly that was granted to Robert Fulton by the State of New York in steamboat traffic, but was later ruled by the United States Supreme Court to be unconstitutional because of a conflicting inter-state grant to Thomas Gibbons by the federal Congress. (Note: For about six months, Thomas Gibbons and Cornelius Vanderbilt operated a steamboat with low fares in defiance of the New York law. Gibbons successfully took his case to the United States Supreme Court. The Court ruled in Gibbons v. Ogden that the state-granted monopoly, which conducted some service between New York and New Jersey, was an unconstitutional violation of interstate commerce. Fares immediately dropped from $7 to $3.)

Economist Lawrence Reed says that a government can cause a coercive monopoly without explicitly banning competition by "simply [bestowing] privileges, immunities, or subsidies on one firm, while imposing costly requirements on all others." For example, Alan Greenspan, in his essay Antitrust, argues that land subsidies to railroad companies in the western portion of the U.S. in 19th century created a coercive monopoly position. He says that "with the aid of the federal government, a segment of the railroad industry was able to 'break free' from the competitive bounds which had prevailed in the East." In addition, regulations may be established that place financial burdens on smaller firms that attempt to compete with larger, more established firms that are better able to absorb the regulatory costs.

== The state as a coercive monopoly ==
Economist Murray Rothbard, noted for his espousal of anarcho-capitalism, argues that the state itself is a coercive monopoly as it uses force to establish "a compulsory monopoly over police and military services, the provision of law, judicial decision-making, the mint and the power to create money, unused land ('the public domain'), streets and highways, rivers and coastal waters, and the means of delivering mail." He says that "a coercive monopolist tends to perform his service badly and inefficiently".

These state-owned companies create an issue of setting unrealistic prices for unreliable services. An example of this was seen in Europe during the late 1980s when bank mergers decreased competition in the banking market. As a result, this coercive behaviour allowed them to sustain high interest rates until the early 1990s, severely impacting their customers. In addition to moral arguments over the use of force, free market anarchists often argue that if these services were open to competition that the market could supply them at a lower price and higher quality.

== Unions ==
Labor unions have been called coercive monopolies which keep wage rates higher than they would otherwise be if individuals competed with each other for wages. Economists who believe this to be the case refer to this as a monopoly wage. This has raised some conversing opinions about the power of unions to contradict antitrust laws. Specifically, collusive methods to increases prices is illegal on public policy standards, but raising labour prices is encouraged. In addition, the unions participating in collective bargaining is applauded for its peaceful dispute settlement tactics, but this can also be seen as prohibited coercive behaviour. Nonetheless, as the intention behind these coercive actions in unions are for the benefit of workers rather than company profits, antitrust laws have not been held against these unions.

== See also ==
- Adverse selection
- Bargaining
- Bargaining power
- Capital market imperfections
- Coercion
- Free market
- Government-granted monopoly
- Government monopoly
- Inequality of bargaining power
- Just price
- Market failure
- Middle-class squeeze
- Natural monopoly
- Non-contestable market
- Regulatory capture
- Rent seeking
- Robber baron (industrialist)
