= Limit price =

A limit price (or limit pricing) is a price, or pricing strategy, where products are sold by a supplier at a price low enough to make it unprofitable for other players to enter the market.

It is used by monopolists to discourage entry into a market, and is illegal in many countries. The quantity produced by the incumbent firm to act as a deterrent to entry is usually larger than would be optimal for a monopolist, but might still produce higher economic profits than would be earned under perfect competition.

The problem with limit pricing as strategic behavior is that once the entrant has entered the market, the quantity used as a threat to deter entry is no longer the incumbent firm's best response. This means that for limit pricing to be an effective deterrent to entry, the threat must in some way be made credible. A way to achieve this is for the incumbent firm to constrain itself to produce a certain quantity whether entry occurs or not. An example of this would be if the firm signed a union contract to employ a certain (high) level of labor for a long period of time. Another example is to build excess production capacity as a commitment device.

Due to the often ambiguous nature of cost in production, it may be relatively easy for a firm to avoid legal difficulties when undertaking such action. Due to this ambiguous nature, limit pricing may well be a commonly used strategy even in modern economies. However, it is often very hard to regulate, since limit pricing is often synonymous with a market monopoly. When a monopoly exists, it becomes very difficult to compare alternative prices with other, similar firms to confirm claims that limit pricing may be occurring.

== Simple example ==
In a simple case, suppose industry demand for good X at market price P is given by:

  
    
      
        
          
            
              Q
              
                D
              
            
          
        
        =
        a
        −
        b
        P
      
    
    {\displaystyle {\mathsf {Q^{D}}}=a-bP}
  

Suppose there are two potential producers of good X, Firm A, and Firm B. Firm A has no fixed costs and constant marginal cost equal to $c > 0$. Firm B also has no fixed costs, and has constant marginal cost equal to $gc$, where $g > 1$ (so that Firm B's marginal cost is greater than Firm A's).

Suppose Firm A acts as a monopolist. The profit-maximizing monopoly price charged by Firm A is then:

  
    
      
        
          p
          
            M
          
        
        =
        
          
            
              a
              +
              c
              b
            
            
              2
              b
            
          
        
      
    
    {\displaystyle p^{M}={\frac {a+cb}{2b}}}
  

Since Firm B will never sell below its marginal cost, as long as $p^M \le gc$, Firm B will not enter the market when Firm A charges $p^M$. That is, the market for good X is an effective monopoly if:

  
    
      
        g
        ≥
        
          
            
              a
              +
              c
              b
            
            
              2
              c
              b
            
          
        
      
    
    {\displaystyle g\geq {\frac {a+cb}{2cb}}}
  

Suppose, on the contrary, that:

  
    
      
        g
        <
        
          
            
              a
              +
              c
              b
            
            
              2
              c
              b
            
          
        
      
    
    {\displaystyle g<{\frac {a+cb}{2cb}}}
  

In this case, if Firm A charges $p^M$, Firm B has an incentive to enter the market, since it can sell a positive quantity of good X at a price above its marginal cost, and therefore make positive profits. In order to prevent Firm B from having an incentive to enter the market, Firm A must set its price no greater than $gc$. To maximize its profits subject to this constraint, Firm A sets price $p^L = gc$ (the limit price).

== See also ==
- List of economics topics
- Predatory pricing
- Strategic entry deterrence
