= Strategic entry deterrence =

In the theories of competition in economics, strategic entry deterrence is when an existing firm within a market acts in a manner to discourage the entry of new potential firms to the market. These actions create greater barriers to entry for firms seeking entrance to the market and ensure that incumbent firms retain a large portion of market share or market power. Deterring strategies, might include an excess capacity, limit pricing, predatory pricing, predatory acquisition (hostile takeovers) and switching costs. Although in the short run, entry deterring strategies might lead to a firm operating inefficiently, in the long run the firm will have a stronger hold over market conditions.

== Preemptive deterrence ==
An incumbent who is trying to strategically deter entry can do so by attempting to reduce the entrant's payoff if it were to enter the market. The expected payoffs are obviously dependent on the number of customers the entrant expects to have – therefore one way of deterring entry is for the incumbent to "tie up" consumers.

The strategic creation of brand loyalty can be a barrier to entry – consumers will be less likely to buy the new entrant's product, as they have no experience of it. Entrants may be forced into expensive price cuts simply to get people to try their product, which will obviously be a deterrent to entry.

Similarly, if the incumbent has a large advertising budget, any new entrant will potentially have to match this in order to raise awareness of their product and a foothold in the market – a large sunk cost that will prevent some firms entering.

Before its patent on aspartame expired, Monsanto engaged in preemptive deterrence when it signed contracts with its biggest customers, Coke and Pepsi. Because Monsanto locked in the consumers of Coke and Pepsi through its contracts, it made entry into the soda market less desirable because potential entrants would have less consumers and, in turn, less profit. Furthermore, if another firm decided to enter the market and obtain contracts with other soda brands, it would be less likely to attract as many customers as Monsanto because customers are loyal to Coke and Pepsi due to their popularity.

Another example is when Xerox created hundreds of patents that were never used (sleeping patents) in order to make it more difficult for an entrant to challenge its monopoly on plain-paper photocopying. By creating so many patents, Xerox made it harder for potential entrants to create patents relating to plain-paper photocopying - increasing entry costs - and less firms were likely to enter the photocopying market.

In both of these examples of strategic deterrence, prior action was taken by incumbents in order to reduce the probability of a subsequent entry by another firm into the market.

== Common entry deterrence strategies ==
=== Excess capacity ===
Strategic excess capacity may be established to either reduce the viability of entry for potential firms. Excess capacity take place when an incumbent firm threatens to entrants of the possibility to increase their production output and establish an excess of supply, and then reduce the price to a level where the competing cannot contend.

Excess capacity typically occurs in markets with firms that have a natural monopoly. Economist Dr. William W. Sharkey established five key aspects that lead to a monopolized industry;

1. The product or service is essential;
2. The location for production supersedes alternatives;
3. The outputs are not storable;
4. The product is produced at an economies of scale; and
5. The product is can only be produced by a single supplier.

=== Limit pricing ===
In a particular market an existing firm may be producing a monopoly level of output, and thereby making supernormal profits. This creates an incentive for new firms to enter the market and attempt to capture some of these profits. One way the incumbent can deter entry is to produce a higher quantity at a lower price than the monopoly level, a strategy known as limit pricing. Not only will this reduce the profits being made, making it less attractive for entrants, but it will also mean that the incumbent is meeting more of the market demand, leaving any potential entrant with a much smaller space in the market. Limit pricing will only be an optimal strategy if the smaller profits made by the firm are still greater than those risked if a rival entered the market. It also requires commitment, for example the building of a larger factory to produce the extra capacity, for it to be a credible deterrent.

However, limit pricing does not always need to be enacted. Many industries use limit pricing as a signaling technique. Signaling is possible here because entrants do not ever have all the information on profit margins of existing companies or the true matrix outcome. When considering entering the market, an entrant must build an outcome matrix and rely on observable factors from the incumbent companies. This gives existing firms the ability to use observable variables to confuse entrants as a strategic barrier to entry. For example, a firm may change its price, leading the incumbent to infer the marginal cost of a product (incorrectly). This could lead a firm with a high-cost structure to charge a low price in order to deter competition or a firm with a low-cost structure to charge a high price to confuse entrants and hopefully deter them.

=== Predatory pricing ===
In a legal sense, a firm is often defined as engaging in predatory pricing if its price is below its short-run marginal cost, often referred to as the Areeda-Turner Law, which forms the basis of US antitrust cases. The rationale for this action is to drive the rival out of the market, and then raise prices once monopoly position is reclaimed. This advertises to other potential entrants that they will encounter the same aggressive response if they enter. According to Luís M. B. Cabral, as long as a potential entrant believes that an incumbent will take action to limit its profits, strategies like predatory pricing can be successful, even if the entrant misreads the situation and the incumbent does not act aggressively towards other entrants.

In the short run, it would be profit maximizing to acquiesce and share the market with the new entrant. However, this may not be the firm's best response in the long run. Once the incumbent acquiesces to an entrant, it signals to other potential entrants that it is "weak" and encourages other entrants. Thus the payoff to fighting the first entrant is also to discourage future entrants by establishing its "hard" reputation. One such example occurred when British Airways engaged in a competition war with Virgin Atlantic throughout the 1980s over its transatlantic route. This led to Virgin Atlantic chairman, Richard Branson, to say that competing with British Airways was "like getting into a bleeding competition with a blood bank."

=== Predatory acquisition ===
Incumbent firms can eliminate the possibility of competition from entering firms by acquiring enough shares from the target firm in order to gain a desired level of control. Predatory acquisitions occur when one firm seeks to purchase a share of a smaller target firm anonymous to the management of the target firm. Predatory acquisitions commonly arise to form a new majority, and establish a greater voting power in order to effect a change.

=== Switching costs ===
Switching costs represent the expenses a consumer faces in the light of changing to the product or service to a competing firms. Switching costs are not strictly monetary. To forestall customers from defecting, a company might employ a number strategies that increases a customer's perceived and fiscal costs when switching. The costs associated with switching commonly fall under three categories; procedural, financial, and relational. Procedural switching costs credited to the time and effort spent in completing the change. A firm might financially deter their customers from leaving by enforcing an exit fee. Relational switching costs refer to the inconveniences that are evoked in learning to use the new product or service.

== See also ==
- Limit price
- Perfect competition
