= Growth imperative =

Economic concept

The role of growth imperatives for the increase in the global gross domestic product per capita is disputed.

Growth imperative is a term in economic theory regarding a possible necessity of economic growth. On the micro level, it describes mechanisms that force firms or consumers (households) to increase revenues or consumption to not endanger their income. On the macro level, a political growth imperative exists if economic growth is necessary to avoid economic and social instability or to retain democratic legitimacy, so that other political goals such as climate change mitigation or a reduction of inequality are subordinated to growth policies.

Current neoclassical, Keynesian and endogenous growth theories do not consider a growth imperative or explicitly deny it, such as Robert Solow. In neoclassical economics, adherence to economic growth would be a question of maximizing utility, an intertemporal decision between current and future consumption (see Keynes–Ramsey rule). Other sociological and political theories consider several possible causes for pursuing economic growth, for example maximizing profit, social comparison, culture (conformity), or political ideologies, but they do not regard them to be compulsive. Possible growth imperatives are discussed in Marxist theory, Schumpeterian theory of creative destruction and ecological economics, as well as in political debates on post-growth and degrowth. It is disputed whether growth imperative is a meaningful concept altogether, who would be affected by it, and which mechanism would be responsible.

== Meaning and definitions ==
At the macroeconomic or political level, the concept of growth imperatives is used by some authors when there seems to be no acceptable political alternative to economic growth, because insufficient growth would lead to economic and social instability up to "severe economic crises". The alternative to growth would not be a stable stationary economy, but uncontrolled shrinkage. The consequences of a renunciation of growth would be unacceptable; growth appears to be without a politically acceptable alternative. While some search for purely "structural theoretical explanations for the commitment to growth", others argue that this macroeconomic phenomenon must be examined at the micro level in line with methodological individualism to explain how and why individual actors (firms, consumers) act and how this interacts with collective structures, and correspondingly study the growth of enterprises with microeconomics and business administration and the increase of consumption using consumption sociology or consumer choice theory.

The discussion on growth imperatives is part of a standing debate over the primacy of structure or agency in shaping human behavior. In the social sciences the term social coercion is used when situation-related circumstances or strong social pressure determine the behaviour. According to Marxist theory, a coercion for firms to "grow or die" is due to economic competition. According to these Marxists, capitalism "cannot stand still, but must always be either expanding or contracting". Similarly, the environmental economist Hans Christoph Binswanger speaks of a growth imperative for firms only when they are existentially threatened by steadily declining profits and ultimately bankruptcy; in other cases he uses the weaker term growth driver. These definitions can be summarized that a growth imperative exists if exterior conditions make it necessary for agents to increase their economic efforts as to avoid existential consequences.

== Microeconomic theories ==
=== Firms ===
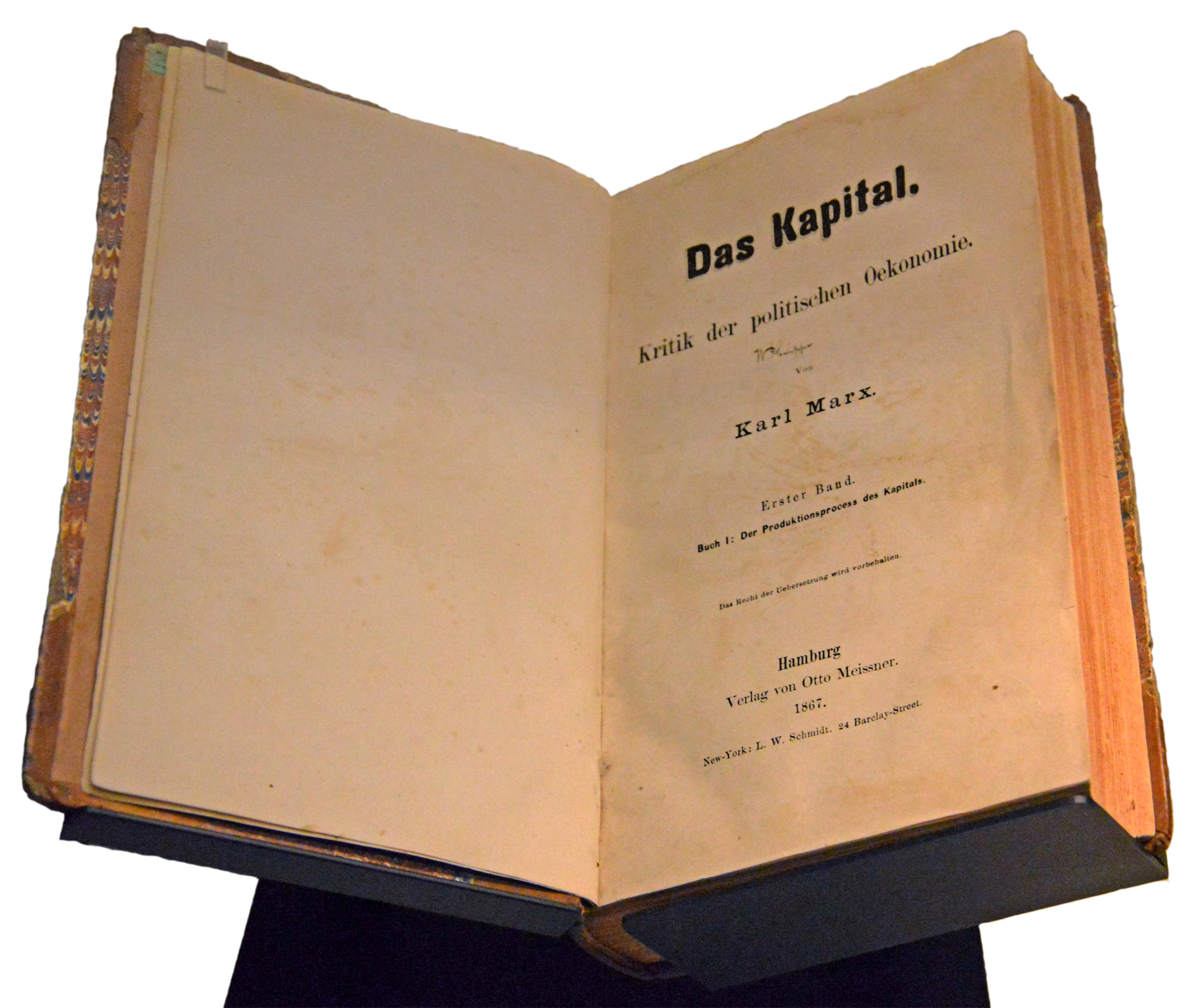
Das Kapital by Karl Marx contains the first theory of a growth imperative, which is still disputed today.

The first theory of a growth imperative is attributed to Karl Marx. In capitalism, zero growth is not possible, because of the mechanisms of competition and accumulation.

[T]he development of capitalist production makes it constantly necessary to keep increasing the amount of the capital laid out in a given industrial undertaking, and competition makes the immanent laws of capitalist production to be felt by each individual capitalist, as external coercive laws. It compels him to keep constantly extending his capital, in order to preserve it, but extend it he cannot, except by means of progressive accumulation.

— Karl Marx

Therefore, a company's growth is considered necessary to ensure the survival of the company ("grow or die"): "investment is not an option, or a discretionary decision, it is an imperative that constrains every capitalists' actions and governs the overall economy" Correspondingly, some authors argue that the compulsion to grow can only be defused by overcoming structures of market economies, or by pushing back profit-oriented companies that expropriate the surplus value. Other authors criticize this Marxist perspective: a company could be profitable without growth if a positive accounting profit is distributed as dividend to the owners. Only if net income had to be retained, companies would be compelled to grow. If a company shows an accounting profit, it has not yet achieved an economic profit in the economic sense, because a return on equity and an entrepreneurial salary would have to be paid from it - the profit would not necessarily be available for growth. Therefore, a market economy with profit-oriented companies is compatible with zero growth, as it is in the models of neoclassical theory (→ zero-profit condition).

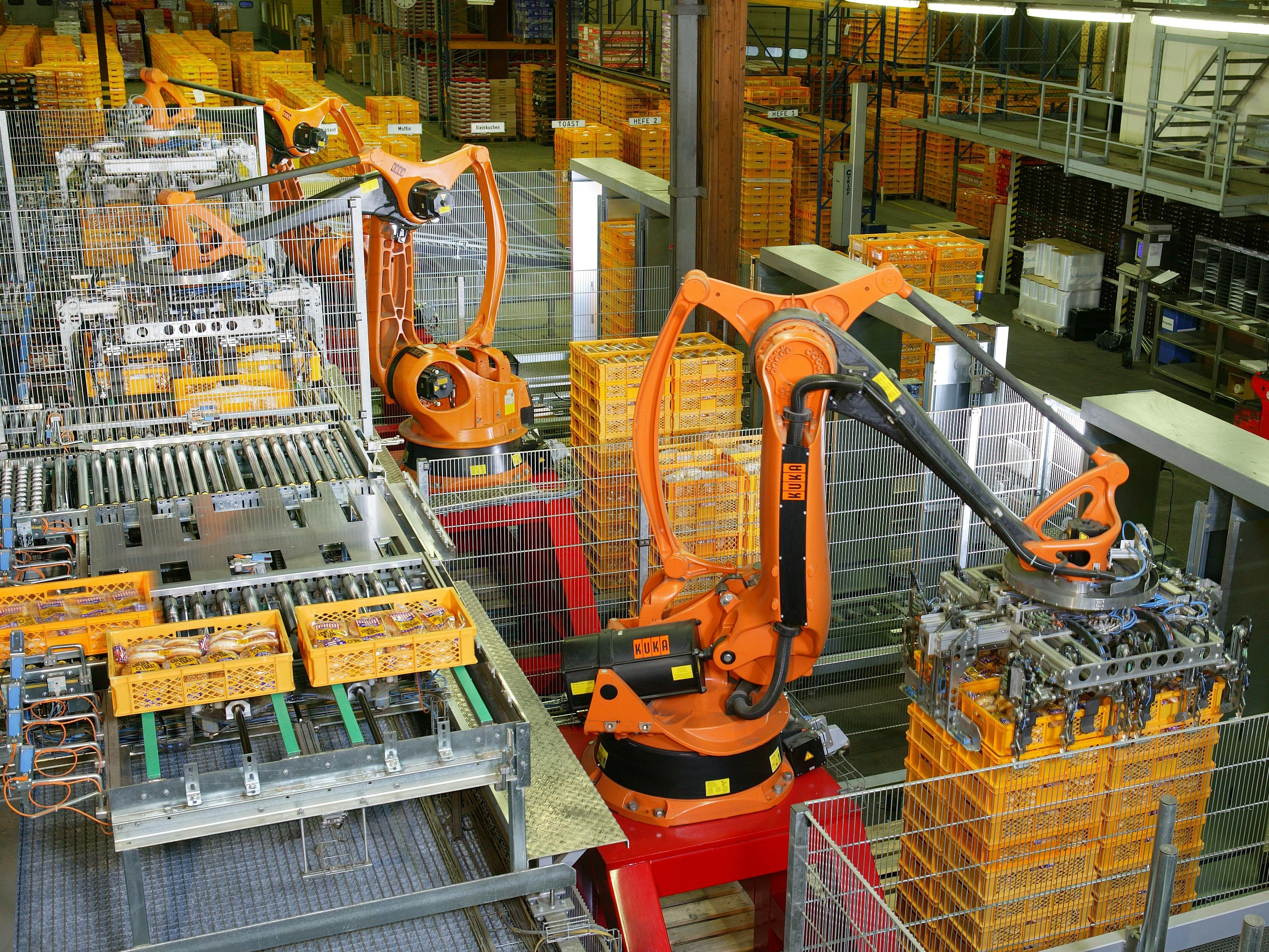
The link between technical progress and resource use is disputed

On the basis of concepts of evolutionary economics, other authors point out that firms can become dependent on growth as a result of certain economic conditions. Joseph Schumpeter had described the creative destruction in which the existence of firms is endangered if they cannot keep up with the innovation competition. This is interpreted as a need to invest in new technologies and to expand production - but which investments would be necessary can only be understood in the light of growth theory. Within neoclassical growth accounting it is largely undisputed that only technological change and new combinations of factors of production make sustainable growth of firms and per capita income possible. However, the contribution of single production factors to economic growth has been disputed for decades: While endogenous growth theory concentrates on the role of human capital (ideas, education, innovations), proponents of ecological or environmental economics emphasize the importance of energy consumption as well as raw materials, which are often non-renewable resources (e.g. fossil fuels). While from the human capital perspective no ecologically damaging growth imperative arises, the resource perspective emphasizes that raw material consumption is lucrative for firms because it allows them to substitute expensive labour with cheaper machines. Accordingly, they would constantly invest in new resource-intensive technologies plus the human capital needed for development, which increases resource consumption and compensates advances in energy efficiency (rebound effects).

There is also disagreement as to whether these dependencies can be overcome at the company level - provided that this is desired by the owners or the management. Proposals include new management practices, changes in product range, supply chains and distribution channels, as well as the creation of solidarity enterprises, collective enterprises and cooperatives. Other authors call for institutional solutions: reforms of corporate law to overcome the legal constraint of public limited companies to maximise profits, reforms of competition law to prevent externalisation at the expense of common goods, or an institutional limitation of resource consumption and/or increasing their costs through ecotaxes or emissions trading (Cap and Trade), so that technical innovations would put a stronger focus on resource productivity instead of labour productivity.

=== Private households ===
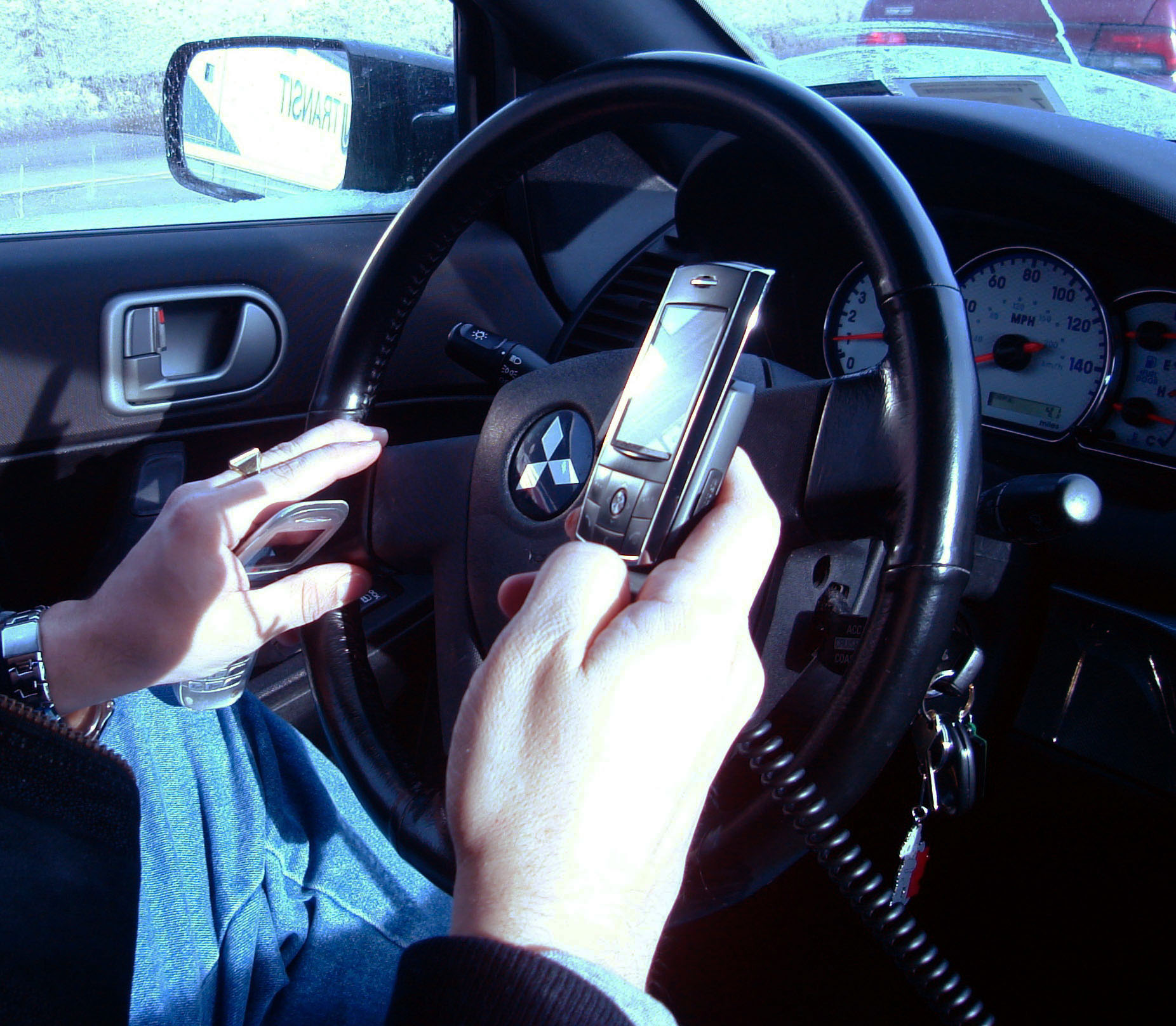
Smart phone and car: voluntary consumption or necessary increases of individual productivity?

An imperative for private households to increase their income and consumption expenditure is rarely discussed. In neoclassical household theory, households try to maximize their utility, whereby, in contrast to the profit maximization of firms, they are not subject to market imperatives. Therefore, a growth imperative is usually not assumed here, but rather a free decision between current and future consumption. This "intertemporal optimization" is represented, for example, by the Keynes-Ramsey rule. In consumption sociology various theories of consumer society examine the influence of social norms on consumption decisions. Examples are conspicuous consumption, which was addressed as early as 1899 by Thorstein Veblen in his book The Theory of the Leisure Class, or competition with positional goods, which was described by Fred Hirsch in 1976 in the book Social Limits to Growth. Some authors claim that comparison with others and the unfair distribution of income and power would lead to a growth imperative for consumers: Consumers would have to work and consume more and more in order to achieve a minimum level of social participation, because the economically weak are stigmatised. The reasons given for this behaviour are fear and powerlessness, guilt and shame. However, whether these theories can actually justify a compulsion to increase consumption is disputed, as long as it is not a matter of securing one's livelihood (for example because of unemployment).

Another line of argument views certain consumption decisions rather as investments for future growth, but sometimes to increase one's own productivity. Technical products such as vehicles, kitchen appliances or smartphones were used to save time and retain opportunities to earn an income. Over time, these goods would become a necessity, therefore a compulsion to increase one's consumption expenditure could be derived in order to not be left behind technically and economically.

== Macroeconomic theories ==
=== Political resp. macroeconomic growth imperative ===
Economic growth is part of goal 8 of the Sustainable Development Goals

Economic growth has been formulated as an important economic policy goal for decades. Examples include the "growth duty" in British legislation, but also the Canadian Jobs and Growth Act, the African Growth and Opportunity Act or the European Stability and Growth Pact of 1997. This has been criticised as politically adhering to a dogma or ideology by some critics of growth.

The theory of a political growth imperative, on the other hand, argues that economic growth would be necessary to avoid economic or social instability and to retain democratic legitimacy, or to guarantee national security and international competition. Some authors stress that public finances or social insurance systems such as unemployment insurance or pensions are dependent on growth. Raghuram Rajan sees the cause primarily in political promises that are inherent to social systems. Unemployment, which would occur in the event of technical progress and simultaneous lack of economic growth, is identified as a central problem (Okun's law). Thus, growth above the employment threshold is repeatedly called for in political debates, in order to reduce unemployment. Growth enhancing state investment, but also numerous incentives for private investment would not be simply politician's free will but indispensable to prevent social instability through mass unemployment. This situation would be aggravated by international competition and free trade.

As a way out, a redirection of technological development with the help of resource taxes is discussed (ecotax, emissions trading), but also a general reduction of working time to reduce unemployment. At the same time, a more equal distribution of income is demanded, either by fighting the privatisation of economic rents such as land rent or resource rent (→ rentier state), or by calling for an unconditional basic income.

=== Monetary system and the role of positive interest rates ===
For a long time, several authors especially from German-speaking countries have been locating a macroeconomic growth imperative in the monetary system, especially due to the combination of credit money and compound interest. This is considered to lead inevitably and system-immanently to an exponential growth of debt and interest-bearing deposits. Some proponents of post-growth would derive a general criticism of positive interest rates from that and support ideas such as demurrage currency, a concept from Freiwirtschaft, or full-reserve banking.

A second line of argument goes back to Hans Christoph Binswanger, his doctoral student Guido Beltrani, and his son Mathias Binswanger. They argue that "a portion of money is constantly removed from circulation" by banks which is mainly responsible for the growth imperative. In his book The Growth Spiral (2013), Hans Christoph Binswanger estimated a necessary minimum growth rate to be 1.8 %, while Mathias Binswanger (2009) derived a minimum growth rate of 0.45 %, such that enterprises can still generate profits in the aggregate. In his book Der Wachstumszwang (2019), this minimum rate is lowered to zero as to enable firms to accumulate profits.

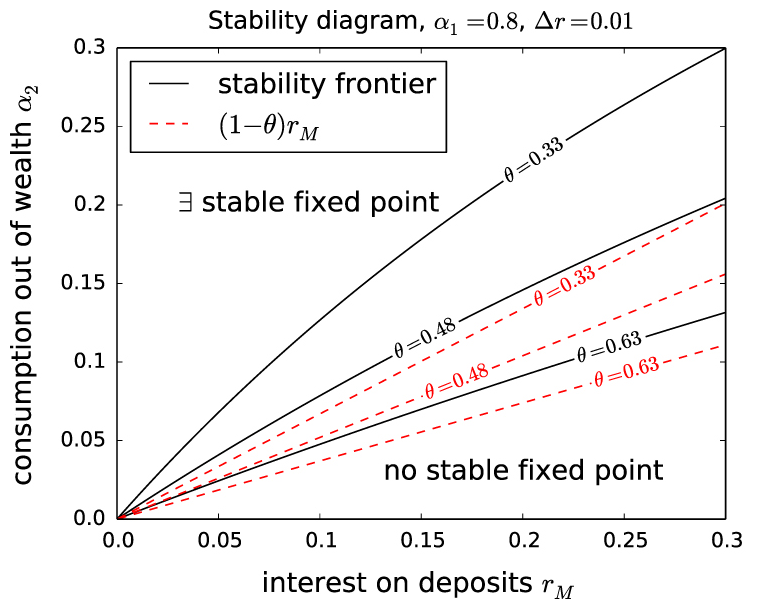
Numerical stability analysis of Stock-Flow consistent models. For certain parameter values (here: interest rate and consumption out of wealth), zero growth is unstable, but stable for others.

Other authors criticise the results of Beltrani as well as H. C. and M. Binswanger on the basis that they are based on inconsistent economic models and therefore not valid (→ Stock-Flow consistent model). Those models show how repaid interest is not simply 'removed' from circulation, but flows back into the economy where it can be earned and repeated used to service debts. Models such as those created by Jackson & Victor show that, if no money is accumulated, then all debt can be serviced, and hence that no growth imperative arises from the creation of money as debt, 'per se'. This leads some theorists to conclude that the monetary growth imperative only applies for certain parameters in the consumption function. They argue that ultimately it is not the interest rate but the savings rate that is decisive for the stability of a stationary economy. If any interest income is consumed in full by the lender, i.e., bank or creditor of the bank, it is available again for repayment. Whether a stationary state can be reached, therefore, depends on the saving decisions of those who earn income or own assets. For zero growth it would only be necessary that savings of some are balanced by consumption out of wealth by others (→ life-cycle hypothesis). The assumption that banks must retain profits even in a non-growing economy would be unfounded. Accordingly, there would be no grow imperative "inherent" to the monetary system, but zero growth would be impossible as long as actors decide to continuously accumulate financial assets.

In neoclassical theory and all varieties that presuppose the neutrality of money (classical dichotomy), the money market has no long-term effects on real economic variables such as economic growth. A monetary growth imperative is already excluded here by assumption. However, post-Keynesian authors who doubt the neutrality of money reject a monetary growth imperative as well.

== Political demands to overcome growth imperatives ==
In September 2018, more than 200 scientists asked the European Union to turn away from any growth imperative – a similar demand was raised by the participants of the International Conference on Degrowth and the post-growth working group of attac Germany. But even within the post-growth or degrowth movement, the existence of growth imperatives is disputed. Among German parties, the demand was included in the political programmes of the Ecological Democratic Party and Alliance 90/The Greens. Green politicians such as Reinhard Loske or Jürgen Trittin call for overcoming growth imperatives. In a dissenting opinion on the final report of the Enquete Commission on Growth, Prosperity and Quality of Life of the German parliament (Bundestag), the experts Michael Müller, Uwe Schneidewind, Ulrich Brand, Norbert Reuter and Martin Jänicke, as well as the members of the Bundestag Hermann E. Ott and the parliamentary group Die Linke, argued that "the question must be answered as to whether progress that is innovative and integrative, socially just and ecologically sustainable is possible without any growth imperative".

== Literature ==
- Binswanger, Hans Christoph (2013). The Growth Spiral: Money, Energy, and Imagination in the Dynamics of the Market Process. Springer. doi:10.1007/978-3-642-31881-8. ISBN 978-3-642-31881-8.
- Binswanger, Mathias (2019). Der Wachstumszwang: Warum die Volkswirtschaft immer weiterwachsen muss, selbst wenn wir genug haben. Wiley-CVH. ISBN 978-3-527-50975-1.
- Ferguson, Peter (2019). "The Growth Imperative". Post-growth Politics. Cham: Springer. pp. 75–100. doi:10.1007/978-3-319-78799-2. ISBN 978-3-319-78797-8.
- Richters, Oliver; Siemoneit, Andreas (2019). "Technologie, Ressourcenverbrauch und Wachstumszwang". Marktwirtschaft reparieren: Entwurf einer freiheitlichen, gerechten und nachhaltigen Utopie. München: oekom. hdl:10419/213814. ISBN 978-3-96238-099-1.
- Richters, Oliver; Siemoneit, Andreas (2019). "Growth imperatives: Substantiating a contested concept". Structural Change and Economic Dynamics. 51: 126–137. doi:10.1016/j.strueco.2019.07.012. S2CID 203243535. Preprint: Oldenburg Discussion Papers in Economics V-414-18, November 2018, hdl:10419/184870.

This article was translated from Wachstumszwang in the German Wikipedia which is based on:

- Richters, Oliver; Siemoneit, Andreas (February 2019). Wachstumszwang – eine Übersicht (PDF). ZOE. Institut für zukunftsfähige Ökonomien. hdl:10419/201503. CC-BY-SA 3.0.
