= Contestable market =

Theory in economics

In economics, the theory of contestable markets, associated primarily with its 1982 proponent William J. Baumol, held that there are markets served by a small number of firms that are nevertheless characterized by competitive equilibrium, and therefore desirable welfare outcomes, because of the existence of potential short-term entrants.

== Theory ==
A perfectly contestable market has three main features:

1. No entry or exit barriers
2. No sunk costs
3. The same level of technology is available to incumbent businesses and new entrants.

A perfectly contestable market is not possible in real life. Instead, the degree of contestability can be observed within markets. The more contestable a market is, the closer it will be to a perfectly contestable market.

Some economists argue that determining price and output is actually dependent not on the type of market structure (whether it is a monopoly or perfectly competitive market) but on the threat of competition.

Thus, for example, a monopoly protected by high barriers to entry (for example, it owns all the strategic resources) will make supernormal or abnormal profits with no fear of competition. However, in the same case, if it did not own the strategic resources for production, other firms could easily enter the market, which would lead to higher competition and thus lower prices. That would make the market more contestable. Sunk costs are those costs that cannot be recovered after a firm shuts down. For example, if a new firm enters the steel industry, the entrant needs to buy new machinery. If, for any reason, the new firm cannot cope with the competition of the incumbent firm, it will plan to move out of the market. However, if the new firm cannot use or transfer the new machines that it bought for the production of steel to other uses in another industry, the fixed costs on machinery become sunk costs so if there are sunk costs in the market, they impede the first assumption of no exit barriers. That market will not be contestable, and no firms would enter the steel industry.

It is very important for firms to have access to the same level of technology as that helps determine the average cost of the product. An incumbent firm having more knowledge and access to a technology for the production of a commodity could enjoy higher economies of scale in the form of lower average cost of production. A new firm entering the market, with insufficient information or technology, could incur a higher average cost of production and so be unable to compete with the incumbent firm. That would lead to the incumbent firm enjoying monopoly power and supernormal profit in the market, as the new firm will exit the market. A solution to the problem could be governments providing equal access to knowledge and technology, as well as financial resources for the same.

Its fundamental features are low barriers to entry and exit; in theory, a perfectly contestable market would have no barriers to entry or exit ("frictionless reversible entry" in economist William Brock's terms). Contestable markets are characterized by "hit and run" competition; if a firm in a contestable market raises its prices so as to begin to earn excess profits, potential rivals will enter the market, hoping to exploit the high price for easy profit. When the original incumbent firm(s) respond by returning prices to levels consistent with normal profits, the new firms will exit. Because of that, even a single-firm market can show highly competitive behavior.

A concise theoretical statement of contestable markets with an illustrative graph is at Economics Online.

== Application ==
The theory of contestable markets has been used to argue for weaker application of antitrust laws, as simply observing a monopoly market may not prove that a firm is exploiting its market power to control the price level. Baumol himself argued based on the theory for both deregulation in certain industries and for more regulation in others.

The applicability of the theory to real-world situations may be questioned, however, particularly as there are very few markets which are completely free of sunk costs and entry and exit barriers. Low-cost airlines remain a commonly referenced example of a contestable market; entrants have the possibility of leasing aircraft and should be able to respond to high profits by quickly entering and exiting. However, it is now generally admitted that Baumol's judgment that the US airline industry was therefore best left deregulated was incorrect since the now duly deregulated industry is "well on its way" to evolving into a concentrated oligopoly. More generally, experimental evidence collected since the publication of Baumol's paper has suggested that perfectly competitive markets would, if they existed, behave in the way Baumol outlined, but the performance of imperfectly contestable markets (i.e. real-world markets) depends "on actual rather than potential competition" perhaps in part due to the range of "strategic responses" available to incumbents that were not considered by Baumol as part of his theory.

== See also ==
- Bertrand–Edgeworth model
- Coercive monopoly
- Monopolistic competition
- Perfect competition
