= History of monopoly =

The original meaning of the word monopoly comes from Greek as a compound of two words: "mono", which means "single" or "one", and "polein", meaning "to sell". This word was defined as an exclusive legal right to sell, granted by the government, usually secured by a patent or license. In the seventeenth century, Sir Edward Coke defined a monopoly as an "allowance by the King to any person or corporation for the sole buying, selling, making, working or using anything, whereby any person or corporation are sought to be restrained of any freedom or liberty that they had before." In the eighteenth century, monopoly was defined by Samuel Johnson as the "exclusive privilege of selling anything." Over time, monopoly has come to be interpreted as the private accumulation of economic power or as an entity that has total or near-total control of a market.

== England ==
Royal monopolies became a major political and legal issue in early seventeenth-century England during the late reign of Elizabeth I and the early reign of James I, who granted monopoly patents that generated revenue for the Crown. The result was a significant increase in prices in particular industries, accompanied by the prohibition of non-licensed suppliers from production, often through legal enforcement of royal patents and privileges. A long dispute regarding the efficiency of royal monopoly grants—influenced by the Darcy v. Allen case and Sir Edward Coke—eventually contributed to the adoption of the Statute of Monopolies (1624), which restricted the Crown's ability to grant monopolies. The undesirable effects of diminishing social wealth were discussed, and new legal and economic arguments against monopolies emerged.

== Colonial America ==
Although most aspects of British law were the same in British colonies, laws on monopoly were less clearly defined in America. Therefore, specific versions of both economic development patents and restrictions on patent issuance were enacted. For example, the Massachusetts Body of Liberties from 1641 declared that no monopolies were acceptable except for new inventions that were profitable to the country. As colonial leaders issued legal amendments via charters and relations with Britain deteriorated, the continuous granting of monopolies to English suppliers became a direct cause of American indignation. When England enacted laws enabling domestic merchants across various sectors to sell under a monopoly in the British colonies, colonists protested and established black markets. One well-known protest was the Boston Tea Party, primarily motivated by the British government's monopoly over tea imports and the East India Company's role in it. Continuous efforts to prevent Americans from competing in foreign markets and to secure benefits associated with it led to the American Revolution and the consequent creation of the United States.

== Post-industrial monopoly ==
The process of creating powerful private monopolistic corporations that meet the definition of modern monopoly based on economic position and market power is most closely associated with the second half of the nineteenth and twentieth centuries in the United States. Public concerns about the state-granted monopolies shifted to fear of private ones. Several emerging economic giants, such as Standard Oil and the Carnegie Steel Company, became so influential that the U.S. government created a new section of antitrust laws to prevent the diminution of social wealth. The most important laws of that time were the Sherman Antitrust Act of 1890 and the Clayton Antitrust Act of 1914. Many state constitutions have been modified to meet current monopoly requirements, for example Minnesota Constitution stated in 1888: "Any combination of persons, either as individuals or members or officers of any corporation to monopolize the markets for food products in this state, or to interfere with, or to restrict the freedom of such markets, is hereby declared to be a criminal conspiracy and shall be punished in such manner as the Legislature shall provide.'' Within this period, both monopolies and government antitrust laws have been modified and spread throughout the world even more with the trend of globalization. Corporations are currently required to comply with antitrust laws to ensure that businesses compete on a level playing field and do not engage in unfair practices.

== See also ==
- Monopolistic competition
- Demonopolization
- Duopoly
- Monopsony
- Bilateral monopoly
- Oligopoly
- Sherman Antitrust Act
