= Government-granted monopoly =

State-sanctioned monopoly by a private company

In economics, a government-granted monopoly (also called a "de jure monopoly" or "regulated monopoly") is a form of coercive monopoly by which a government grants exclusive privilege to a private individual or firm to be the sole provider of a good or service; potential competitors are excluded from the market by law, regulation, or other mechanisms of government enforcement. As a form of coercive monopoly, government-granted monopoly is contrasted with an unregulated monopoly, wherein there is no competition but it is not forcibly excluded.

Amongst forms of coercive monopoly it is distinguished from government monopoly or state monopoly (in which government agencies hold the legally enforced monopoly rather than private individuals or firms) and from government-sponsored cartels (in which the government forces several independent producers to partially coordinate their decisions through a centralized organization). Advocates for government-granted monopolies often claim that they ensure a degree of public control over essential industries, without having those industries actually run by the state. Opponents often criticize them as political favors to corporations. Government-granted monopolies may be opposed by those who would prefer free markets as well as by those who would prefer to replace private corporations with public ownership.

== History ==
Under mercantilist economic systems, European governments with colonial interests often granted large and extremely lucrative monopolies to companies trading in particular regions, such as the Dutch East India Company.

Today, government-granted monopolies may be found in public utility services such as public roads, mail, water supply, and electric power, as well as certain specialized and highly regulated fields such as education and gambling. In many countries, lucrative natural resources industries, especially the petroleum industry, are controlled by government-granted monopolies. Franchises granted by governments to operate public transit through public roads are another example.

== Patent ==
A patent is a set of exclusive rights granted by a state or national government to an inventor or his/her assignee for a limited period of time in exchange for a public disclosure of an invention.

The procedure for granting patents, the requirements placed on the patentee, and the extent of the exclusive rights vary widely between countries according to national laws and international agreements. Typically, however, a patent application must include one or more claims defining the invention which must be new, inventive, and useful or industrially applicable. In many countries, certain subject areas are excluded from patents, such as business methods and mental acts. The exclusive right granted to a patentee in most countries is the right to prevent others from making, using, selling, or distributing the patented invention without permission.

== Copyright ==
Copyright is a legal right created by the law of a country that grants the creator of an original work exclusive rights for its use and distribution. This is usually only for a limited time. The exclusive rights are not absolute but subject to limitations and exceptions to copyright law, including fair use. A major limitation on copyright is that it protects only the original expression of ideas, and not the underlying ideas themselves.

== Trademark ==
A trademark or trade mark (Note: The styling of trademark as a single word is predominantly used in the United States and Philippines only, while the two-word styling trade mark is used in many other countries around the world, including the European Union and Commonwealth and ex-Commonwealth jurisdictions (although Canada officially uses trade-mark pursuant to the Trade-mark Act, trade mark and trademark are also commonly used).) is a distinctive sign or indicator used by an individual, business organization, or other legal entity to identify that the products or services to consumers with which the trademark appears originate from a unique source, and to distinguish its products or services from those of other entities.

Trademarks can act as a form of consumer protection that lowers the transaction costs between a buyer and seller who are not personally acquainted.

== Directly mandated ==
Governments have granted monopolies to forms of copy prevention. In the Digital Millennium Copyright Act, for example, the proprietary Macrovision copy prevention technology is required for analog video recorders. Though other forms of copy prevention aren't prohibited, legally requiring Macrovision effectively grants it a monopoly and prevents other, potentially more effective copy prevention methods from being developed.

== Background of the role of government ==
Rent-seeking behavior can be incentivized by monopolies, foreign trade restrictions and state subsidies. Governments can also create monopolies in an attempt to reduce inefficiency in markets.

Companies can also exhibit rent-seeking behavior even if not explicitly incentivized to do so. For example, a manufacturer that has no direct competitors can limit its output, thereby producing artificial scarcity. This scarcity, in turn, is used as justification for increased prices.

Monopoly creation is not always a strict market phenomenon. Voters, government officials, and government employees can be persuaded to allow the creation or protection of monopolies due to various incentives, because of actions by special interest groups that can impose costs on the general public, or because social goals other than economic efficiency are being pursued. Government granted monopolies constitute a fair portion of monopolized industries.

=== Natural monopolies ===
A natural monopoly occurs when a single company dominates the market by having the lowest prices or the products most in demand by consumers. Fixed costs and variable costs can both be factors. If the fixed costs associated with providing a service or product are very high, it may not make economic sense for new competitors to enter the market. For example, it is rarely worthwhile to build second or third tram networks in cities where tram infrastructure already exists. Because the fixed cost of construction is too high, the expected return is not worth the investment.

According to economist Arnold Harberger, the loss of deadweight from monopolies in the US manufacturing industry is only 0.1% of GNP, so the real problem is not the existence of monopolies. The real problems are the social and opportunity costs. These include time and resources expended by lobbyists, consumers, and producers who might otherwise redirect those resources to other, more productive activities.

In the case of natural monopolies in private hands, regulation can be introduced to dissolve or restructure monopolies. The government can also regulate prices in certain sectors where natural monopolies develop. This can be done directly by setting the price (for example, the price of rail or gas) or by regulating the return (for example, in the case of telephone services). Whatever method is used, the goal is to lower prices to cost levels. Some economists, such as Thomas Sowell, Walter Williams, and Wayne Winegarden argue that price controls have disastrous economic effects or are otherwise immoral.

=== Alternative interpretation ===
Dennis Thompson notes, "Corruption is bad not because money and benefits change hands, and not because of the motives of participants, but because it privatizes valuable aspects of public life, bypassing processes of representation, debate, and choice."

== Criticism ==
Opponents of government-granted monopoly often point out that such a firm is able to set its pricing and production policies without fear of breeding potential competition. They argue that this causes inefficiencies in the market place, such as unnecessarily high prices to consumers for the good or service being supplied. It has been argued that government-imposed price caps might avert this problem.

Some economists, such as Leonard Read, argue that government-granted monopolies are immoral, whereas con-coercive monopolies are not necessarily so.

== Examples of government-granted monopolies ==
- Saudi Aramco
- British East India Company
- French East India Company
- Theatre Royal, Drury Lane (formerly)
- K–12 education
- Federal Reserve System
- Sociedade de Turismo e Diversões de Macau (formerly)
- Specialty Society Relative Value Scale Update Committee and American Medical Association
- Bell System

== See also ==
- Coercive monopoly
- Legal monopoly
- Copyright
- Government monopoly
- Monopoly
- Natural monopoly
- Rent seeking
- Federal Reserve System
