= Complementary monopoly =

Concept in microeconomics

A complementary monopoly is an economic concept. It considers a situation where consent must be obtained from more than one agent to obtain a good. In turn leading to a reduction in surplus generated relative to an outright monopoly, if the two agents do not cooperate. The theory was originally proposed in the nineteenth century by Antoine Augustin Cournot.

This can be seen in private toll roads where more than one operator controls a different section of the road. The solution is for one agent to purchase all sections of the road.

Complementary goods are a less extreme form of this effect. In this case, one good is still of value even if the other good is not obtained.

In a 1968 paper Hugo F. Sonnenschein claims complementary monopoly is equivalent to Cournot duopoly.

== Example ==
Consider a road between two towns where half of the road is owned by two agents. A customer must pass two toll booth in order to pass from one town to the other. Each agent sets the price of his toll booth.

Given a demand function,

$D = D_{max}\cdot (P_{max} - P)$,

The optimal price for a monopolist is

$P = \frac{P_{max}} {2}$

leading to revenue of

$R = {D}\cdot {P} = {D_{max}\cdot (P_{max} - \frac{P_{max}} {2})}\cdot \frac{P_{max}} {2} = {D_{max}\cdot \frac{P_{max}^2} {4}}$

If both agents are independently setting their prices, then the Nash equilibrium is for each to set their price at

$P = \frac{P_{max}} {3}$.

This leads to an increase in the total price to

$P = \frac{2\cdot P_{max}} {3}$

and a decrease in total revenue to

$R = {D}\cdot {P} = {D_{max}\cdot (P_{max} - \frac{2\cdot P_{max}} {3})}\cdot \frac{2\cdot P_{max}} {3} = {D_{max}\cdot \frac{2\cdot P_{max}^2} {9}}$

The total revenue generated by the two owners is reduced and the price is increased. This means that both the owners and the users of the road are worse off than they would otherwise be.
