= State monopoly =

Government control of an industry or economic sector

In economics, a government monopoly or public monopoly is a form of coercive monopoly in which a government agency or government corporation is the sole provider of a particular good or service and competition is prohibited by law. It is a monopoly created, owned, and operated by the government. It is usually distinguished from a government-granted monopoly, where the government grants a monopoly to a private individual or company.

A government monopoly may be run by any level of government—national, regional, local; for levels below the national, it is a local monopoly. The term 'state monopoly' usually means a government monopoly run by the national government.

== Characteristics of state monopolies ==
A state monopoly can be characterized by its commercial behavior not being effectively limited by the competitive pressures of private organisations. This occurs when its business activities exert an extensive influence within the market, can act autonomously of any competitors, and potential competitors are unable to successfully compete with it.

These activities have a major influence on the operational environment when their trading activities are not subject to competitive forces inherent within free trading markets. Therefore, this results in using its market dominance and influence to its advantage, in affecting how the market evolves over a long period of time. This is especially the case if the state monopoly controls access to vital inputs essential to operating within the market.

The high degree of autonomy and ability to act independently in the market has been demonstrated by the ability to alter relationships with its customers to its advantage, without negatively impacting its dominant market share. A state monopoly's ability to increase the price or quantity of goods and services provided, without a relational change in its own operating costs (coupled with maintaining this price or quantity at above a market clearing rate), demonstrates its ability to disregard any competitive forces within the market. A state monopoly also retains the ability to reduce service value, or impose restrictive terms and conditions, without experiencing a loss in market share.

== Purpose of state monopolies ==
The theoretical purpose of state monopolies is to maximize collective welfare. This is based on the idea that public administrations are not strictly aimed at profit-making. Products or services, therefore, can be guaranteed to consumers of that supply of that product or service under the best conditions and at prices that are comparable to the expectations of the value and characteristics of the product or service.

However, the structure of a country's economy more broadly usually determines how state monopolies operate. In countries that are members of the OECD, sectors where there are state monopolies are usually those that are meeting the "needs of utilities and public services." Whereas, in developing economies, state monopolies can disrupt healthy business competition, and in centrally controlled economies, such stifling of private competition plateaus economic growth.

The concept of public goods, as produced and distributed under state monopolies, is that they are supplied at a level independent from, or inconsistent with, the actual market demand for the good. Therefore, the price does not reflect the utility of the product or service. Under Marxist economic ideology, this advocates for a centralized production system to account for the fact that this product or service should be universally available, and competition 'badly adapts' to the constraints to which the supply of these products or services is subject.

== Market power ==
A state monopoly's market power and dominance can arise from its superior innovative capacity or greater performance. However, any of the three following factors more broadly explain a state monopoly's existence:

- A natural monopoly endures within the market, whereby the most efficient form of meeting demand is through the creation of a single government entity.
- The state monopoly is legislated for, with legislative instruments precluding competitive activities regarding the provision of goods or services.
- A poorly contestable market exists, with competition previously operating inefficiently despite the lack of legal restrictions.

=== Evidence of exercising market power ===
The primary determinations of demonstrating the market power of state monopolies are:

- The monopoly's economic income within the market is characterized by disproportionate returns on its existing asset base. This income would be excessive, if it were not a result of its inefficient operations.
- There is a substantial difference between best practice benchmarks within private organizations and the state monopoly's own productive efficiency. For example, a monopoly's lack of productive efficiency could be a result of gold plating of assets.
- The monopoly cross-subsidies incomes between loss-making activities and profitable activities. If the aforementioned occurs through production or pricing behaviors, this suggests usual competitive forces characteristic of competitive markets are not being applied to the state monopoly. A firm engaging in this practice under normal market conditions, would not survive in the long run.

== Examples ==
The most prominent example of the monopoly is law and the legitimate use of physical force. In many countries, the postal system is run by the government, with competition forbidden by law in some or all services. Also, government monopolies on public utilities, telecommunications and railroads have historically been common, though recent decades have seen a strong privatization trend throughout the industrialized world.

In Nordic countries, some goods deemed harmful are distributed through a government monopoly. For example, in Denmark, Finland, Iceland, Norway, and Sweden government-owned companies have monopolies for selling alcoholic beverages. Casinos and other institutions for gambling might also be monopolized. In Finland, the government has a monopoly on operating slot machines (see Veikkaus). Similar regimes for alcohol exist in the United States, where certain alcoholic beverage control states (ABC states), e.g. Pennsylvania and Virginia, maintain state-owned-and-operated monopolies on the sale of certain kinds of alcohol (typically distilled spirits and sometimes wine or beer). In these monopolies over harmful goods or services, the monopoly is designed to reduce the consumption of the product by deliberately decreasing the efficiency of the market.

Governments often create or allow monopolies to exist and grant them patents. This limits entry and allows the patent-holding firm to earn a monopoly profit from an invention.

Health care systems where the government controls the industry and specifically prohibits competition, such as in Canada, are government monopolies.

== Reforms to enhance competition ==
Although state monopolies are sustained through legislative instruments, many major economies have seen efforts to reform the disproportionate market powers they sustain, to therefore enhance competition. This has been enacted through regulatory reforms (removing statutory restrictions to market competition) and structural reforms (including separating contestable elements of a state monopoly, and creating third party rights of access to natural monopolies).

Across all levels of governmental jurisdiction, both structural and regulatory reforms have been preferred, as they force all market participants (both state monopolies and private industry) to respond to competitive pressures, as opposed to legislated regulatory structures. This has been observed to result in more optimal outcomes for an economy, as resource allocation is no longer directed by legislative instruments or regulatory authorities.

Despite these reform efforts to promote competitive markets, regulatory and structural reforms struggle to overcome the entrenched market dominance of state monopolies. This is resultant of advantages enjoyed by state monopolies, including first mover advantages.

== Advantages ==
The following advantages may happen or not:

- Government monopolies tend to comply with law (tax compliance, environmental law, safety regulations)
- Prices of a good or service might be stable or at a set price.
- No economic deadweight in advertising
- Greater and stable government income than with a state-owned company in a free market
- No pressure to drive down costs (race to the bottom), which can be seen as posing bases for more ethical business
- Can take over a private monopoly judged harmful.

== Disadvantages ==
Government monopolies have traditional risks of usual monopolies:

- High prices can arise
- Abuse of market dominance

Furthermore, there are concerns that government-controlled entities can be manipulated by political will. This can manifest through the allocation of resources for the purpose of political ends, rather than for the promotion of economic efficiency.

== See also ==
- Alcohol monopoly
- Coercive monopoly
- Crown corporation
- Salt commission
- Government-granted monopoly
- Monopoly
- Monopoly on violence
- Nationalization
- Natural monopoly
- Private police
- State monopoly capitalism
