= Barriers to entry =

Economic theory

In theories of competition in economics, a barrier to entry, or an economic barrier to entry, is a fixed cost that must be incurred by a new entrant, regardless of production or sales activities, into a market that incumbents do not have or have not had to incur.

Because barriers to entry protect incumbent firms and restrict competition in a market, they can contribute to distortionary prices and are therefore most important when discussing antitrust policy. Barriers to entry often cause or aid the existence of monopolies and oligopolies, or give companies market power.

Barriers of entry also have an importance in industries.

Governments can also create barriers to entry to meet consumer protection laws, protecting the public.

== Definitions ==
Various conflicting definitions of "barrier to entry" have been put forth since the 1950s. This has caused there to be no clear consensus on which definition should be used.

McAfee, Mialon, and Williams list seven common definitions in economic literature in chronological order including:

In 1956, Joe S. Bain used the definition "an advantage of established sellers in an industry over potential entrant sellers, which is reflected in the extent to which established sellers can persistently raise their prices above competitive levels without attracting new firms to enter the industry." McAfee et al. criticized this as being tautological by putting the "consequences of the definition into the definition itself."

In 1968, George Stigler defined an entry barrier as "A cost of producing that must be borne by a firm which seeks to enter an industry but is not borne by firms already in the industry." McAfee et al. criticized the phrase "is not borne" as being confusing and incomplete by implying that only current costs need be considered.

In 1979, Franklin M. Fisher gave the definition "anything that prevents entry when entry is socially beneficial." McAfee et al. criticized this along the same lines as Bain's definition.

In 1981, Baumol and Willig gave the definition "An entry barrier is anything that requires an expenditure by a new entrant into an industry, but that imposes no equivalent cost upon an incumbent"

In 1994, Dennis Carlton and Jeffrey Perloff gave the definition, "anything that prevents an entrepreneur from instantaneously creating a new firm in a market." Carlton and Perloff then dismiss their own definition as impractical and instead use their own definition of a "long-term barrier to entry" which is defined very closely to the definition in the introduction.

In 2011, Wheelen and Hunger gave the definition "an obstruction that makes it difficult for a company to enter an industry".

A primary barrier to entry is a cost that constitutes an economic barrier to entry on its own. An ancillary barrier to entry is a cost that does not constitute a barrier to entry by itself, but reinforces other barriers to entry if they are present.

An antitrust barrier to entry is "a cost that delays entry and thereby reduces social welfare relative to immediate but equally costly entry". This contrasts with the concept of economic barrier to entry defined above, as it can delay entry into a market but does not result in any cost-advantage to incumbents in the market. All economic barriers to entry are antitrust barriers to entry, but the converse is not true.

== Examples ==
=== Porter's barriers to entry ===
An article produced by Michael Porter in 2008 stated that new entrants to an industry have the desire to gain market share, and often substantial resources. The seriousness of the threat of entry depends on the barriers present and on the reaction from existing competitors. Michael Porter's article shows 6 main sources of barriers to entry for entrants:

The first barrier to entry found in the article is the supply-side economies of scale. These scales arise when incumbents produce larger volumes of their product for a lower total cost. This can occur if they spread their fixed costs over more units, utilize a more efficient technology or are on better terms with their suppliers.

The second barrier to entry is the demand-side benefits of scale or network effects. According to Porters article, this arises when a buyer's willingness to pay for a company's product increases with the number of other buyers who also patronize the company. Essentially, through network effects the buyers may trust the larger companies more than smaller ones. This barrier discourages the entrant due to incumbent's embedded data and the structural adjustment programs made internally.

The third barrier is capital requirements for the initial investment and running of a company. Companies often require a large amount of capital when starting to pay for fixed facilities but also produce their inventory and fund start-up losses. The magnitude of the barrier increases if the capital is required for unrecoverable expenditure such as advertising and research and development.

The fourth barrier is incumbency advantages independent of size. For the incumbent, this barrier theoretically gives them a cost and quality advantage over the entrants. Specifically, these are often regarding proprietary technology, preferential access to raw materials, favourable geographic locations, established brand identities and even cumulative experience. This barrier more specifically outlines the favourable traits incumbents adopt over-time due to their established place in the industry, making it unavoidable for entrants in certain industries.

The fifth barrier is the unequal access to distribution channels between the incumbents and the entrants. Most companies require some type of distribution channel for the transport of their product. In the case where entrants cannot bypass this barrier, they end up forming their own distribution channel. The problem for entrants is that the more limited the wholesale and retail channels are, the more competitors have tied them up and consequently the more difficult entry into the industry will be.

The final barrier is restrictive government policy. Importantly, this barrier can either aid or hinder an entrant and even effect the other barriers. Restrictive government policies can block entrance through licensing requirements and restrictions on foreign investments. A clear example these may include the alcohol and taxi industries. Policies can heighten other entry barriers through intellectual property laws and even environmental and safety regulations that raise economies of scale for entrants.

Furthermore, a potential new market entrant's expectations about the reaction of the existing competitors within the industry will also be a contributing factor on their decision to enter the market.

An entrant may reconsider entering an industry or choose a new one altogether if incumbents have displayed conscious reactions to entrants in the past. Another discouraging indication for an entrant is if the incumbent is in possession of substantial resources to respond to an entrant. These resources generally consist of excess cash and unused borrowing power. This may also allow for incumbents to lower prices to either keep their market share or lower their excess capacity, another discouraging sign for an entrant.

=== Primary economic barriers to entry ===
- Distributor agreements – Exclusive agreements with key distributors or retailers can make it difficult for other manufacturers to enter an industry. This is a particular problem if, prior to entry, the other firms in the market use intensive distribution strategies in order to restrict the access of potential entrants to distributors. In response, if access to existing distribution channels is too difficult, new entrants may create their own. For example, new low-cost airlines often encourage passengers to book online instead of through travel agents.
- Intellectual property – A potential entrant requires access to production technology as efficient as that of the combatant monopolist in order to freely enter a market. Patents, however, give a firm the legal right to stop other firms from producing a product for a given period of time, and so restrict entry. Patents are intended to encourage invention and technological progress by guaranteeing proceeds as an incentive. Similarly, trademarks and servicemarks may represent a kind of entry barrier for a particular product or service if the market is dominated by one or a few well-known names. Incumbent firms may have an exclusive right to use the brand name, making it expensive or impossible for new entrants to license rights to names.
- Capital requirements - Many industries require the investment of large financial resources to start a new business, which deters new entrants. For example, new airlines require millions of dollars for purchasing planes, staff training etc. In addition, new entrants often experience serious difficulties in raising funds for unrecoverable expenses, such as advertising and R&D. In the pharmaceutical industry, for instance, companies may invest heavily in research in order to develop Covid vaccines, then end up with disappointing results and lose all of their investment.
- Restrictive practices – Established policies may protect existing players and restrict entry. For instance, air transport agreements may make it difficult for new airlines to obtain landing slots at some airports. Or Certificate of Need (CON) laws in some of US states may require medical service providers to file an application and prove community need before offering their services—a practice that has been found to benefit incumbents.
- Supplier agreements – Exclusive agreements with businesses that represent key links in the supply chain can make it difficult for other manufacturers to enter an industry, e.g. when suppliers offer significant discounts to certain buyers or offer their product exclusively.
- Customer Switching barriers – At times, it may be difficult or expensive for customers to switch providers, especially if they have to retrain employees or modify internal information systems. Indeed, switching costs are often intentionally made high in order to discourage customers from changing suppliers and adopting the technological innovations provided by others.
- Tariffs – Taxes on imports prevent foreign firms from entering into domestic markets.
- Taxes – Smaller companies typically fund expansions out of retained profits so high tax rates hinder their growth and ability to compete with existing firms. Larger firms may be better able to avoid high taxes through either loopholes written into law favoring large companies or by using their larger tax accounting staffs to better avoid paying the higher taxes.
- Zoning – Government allows certain economic activity in specified land areas but excludes others, allowing monopoly over the land needed.

=== Contentious examples ===
The following examples are sometimes cited as barriers to entry, but don't fit all the commonly cited definitions of a barrier to entry. Many of these fit the definition of antitrust barriers to entry or ancillary economic barriers to entry.

- Economies of scale – Cost advantages raise the stakes in a market, which can deter and delay entrants into the market. Bulk buying offers buyers larger negotiating power to get the lowest price and they take advantage on that. This makes scale economies an antitrust barrier to entry, but they can also be ancillary. The per-unit cost will be lower in scale economies due to the spread of fixed costs to larger volumes, technology efficiencies and better supplier terms, therefore new entrants join the industry either on a large scale or at a cost disadvantage. Cost advantages can sometimes be quickly reversed by advances in technology. For example, the development of personal computers has allowed small companies to make use of database and communications technology which was once extremely expensive and only available to large corporations.
- Network effect/Demand-side benefits of scale – When a good or service has a value that increases on average for every additional customer, this exerts a similar antitrust and ancillary barrier to that of economies of scale. Customers are more willing to buy crucial products from larger companies than newcomers. It increases the difficulty of entering the industry or reduces the initial profit margins for new entrants.
- Government regulations – Government regulations are rules having the force of law, prescribed by a superior or competent authority, relating to the actions of those under the authority's control. Licences, for example, may be required when entering a specific field, particularly in industries that are heavily protected by the government. As a result, the field is dominated by government-owned firms (e.g., energy), or existing players are protected in the market (e.g., Taxi service or TV). The regulations themselves may set the barriers for not letting others to enter a market, or requirements for licenses and permits may raise the level of investment required, creating an antitrust barrier to entry. However, sometimes government regulations may make entry easier, such as AIR-21 which requires airports to make facilities available to access by all carriers.
- Grandfather clauses can result in a bias against new entrants.
- Advertising – Incumbent firms can seek to make it difficult for new competitors by spending heavily on advertising that new firms would find more difficult to afford or unable to staff and or undertake. This is known as the market power theory of advertising. Here, established firms' use of advertising creates a consumer perceived difference in its brand from other brands to a degree that consumers see its brand as a slightly different product. Since the brand is seen as a slightly different product, products from existing or potential competitors cannot be perfectly substituted in place of the established firm's brand. This makes it hard for new competitors to gain consumer acceptance. It reflected by brand promoting and the increase of customer loyalties.
- Capital – Investments in equipment, building, and raw materials may represent ancillary barriers, particularly in the case of sunk costs, which can increase the strength of barriers to entry. Sunk costs may also lead to monopoly profits, improper resource allocation and low efficiency. For capital-intensive industries, entrants will also need much more financial capital.
- Uncertainty – When a market actor has various options with overlapping possible profits, choosing any one of them has an opportunity cost. This cost might be reduced by waiting until conditions are clearer, which can result in an ancillary antitrust barrier.
- Incumbency advantages independent of scale – Incumbents often have advantages over newcomers, including proprietary technology, know-how, favorable access to raw materials, favorable geographic locations, established brand reputation and learning curve cost advantages. It is reflected by learning curve effects and economies of scale, and it is one of the most critical barriers to entry strategies.
- Vertical integration – Vertical integration, a firm's coverage of more than one level of production while pursuing practices which favor its own operations at each level, is often cited as an entry barrier as it requires a similar large-scale effort on the part of competitors.
- Research and development – Some products, such as microprocessors, require a large upfront investment in technology which will deter potential entrants. The existing firms in the market may also use efficient investments in research and development to increase technological economies of scale, and boost industry development, which work against entrants who lack the funding and resources to enter the market. However, critics also point out that entry barriers can reduce the efficiency of R&D because firms have no incentive to efficiently invest in innovation.
- Customer loyalty – Large incumbent firms may have existing customers loyal to established products. As a result, the presence of established strong brands within a market can be a barrier to entry.
- Control of resources – If a single firm has control of a resource essential for a certain industry, then other firms may be unable to compete in the industry.
- Inelastic demand – One strategy to penetrate a market is to sell at a lower price than the incumbents. This, however, is ineffective with price-insensitive consumers.
- Predatory pricing – Predatory pricing is the practice of selling at a loss to make competition more difficult for new firms that cannot bear such losses as easily as a large dominant firm with large lines of credit or cash reserves. Illegal in most places, predatory pricing, however, is difficult to prove. See antitrust. In the context of international trade, such practices are often called dumping.
- Occupational licensing – Examples include educational, licensing, and quota limits on the number of people who can enter a certain profession.
- Product differentiation of incumbents - Incumbent firms show advantages in advertising, brands, customer loyalties or product differentiation which can enable them to be first in the market.
- Number of competitors - During a period when the number of companies is increasing, the possibility of market entry is higher, Conversely, the likelihood of market entry is less during a period defined by a large number of business failures.
- Price - Intensive price competition can hinder entrants, who may be unable to set their prices as low as incumbents. As a result, industries with high barriers to entry often contain a monopoly or oligopoly with dominant power in terms of price. This dominance allows them to charge a higher price or, if other firms join the market, to use their market power and cash flow to lower prices, beating out the new competition.
- Technology and technological change - Technological change, often seen in high technology sectors, can have a tremendous impact on economies of scale.
- Market concentration - Market concentration, though it usually has only a minor effect, can still work against new entrants.
- Seller concentration - Seller concentration can have a major effect on new entrants, making it difficult for them to enter the market, contributing further to seller concentration.
- Divisionalization - Typically in highly profitable oligopolistic industries, it is cheaper for an incumbent to establish a new department than it would be for new entrants.
- Selling expenses - A change in demand function may be endogenous to market entry due to sales efforts.
- Incumbent's expected reaction to market entry - If incumbent firms expect new entrants to represent a threat, and are capable of preventing market entry, they may take action to prevent new entrants from competing.
- Possession of strategic raw materials - An ability to access strategic raw materials provides advantages for the accessing companies, such as an absolute cost advantage.

== Classification and examples ==
Michael Porter classifies the markets into four general cases:

- High barrier to entry and high exit barrier (for example, telecommunications, energy)
- High barrier to entry and low exit barrier (for example, consulting, education)
- Low barrier to entry and high exit barrier (for example, hotels, ironworks)
- Low barrier to entry and low exit barrier (for example, retail, electronic commerce)

These markets combine the attributes:

- Markets with high entry barriers have few players and thus high profit margins.
- Markets with low entry barriers have many players and thus low profit margins.
- Markets with high exit barriers are unstable and not self-regulated, so the profit margins fluctuate very much over time.
- Markets with a low exit barrier are stable and self-regulated, so the profit margins do not fluctuate much over time.

The higher the barriers to entry and exit, the more prone a market tends to be a natural monopoly. The reverse is also true. The lower the barriers, the more likely the market will become perfect competition.

== Market structure ==
A structural barrier to entry is a cost incurred by new entrants to a market that is caused by inherent industry conditions, such as upfront capital investment, economies of scale and network effects. For example, the cost to develop a factory and obtain the initial capital required for manufacturing can be seen as a structural barrier to entry.

A strategic barrier to entry is a cost incurred by new entrants that is artificially created or enhanced by existing firms. This could take the form of exclusive contracts, whether supply or demand-side, or through price manipulation in non-competitive markets.

A market with perfect competition features zero barriers to entry. Under perfect competition, firms are unable to control prices, and produce similar or identical goods. This means that firms cannot operate strategic barriers to entry. Perfect competition implies no economies of scale; this means that structural barriers to entry are also not possible under perfect competition.

Monopolistic competition can allow for medium barriers to entry. Because the enterprises can earn their short-term revenue through innovation and marketing new products to push the price higher than average costs and marginal costs, barriers to entry can be made higher. However, due to the low cost of the information in monopolistic competition, the barrier of entry is lower than in oligopolies or monopolies as new entrants come.

An Oligopoly will typically see high barriers to entry, due to the size of the existing enterprises and the competitive advantages gained from that size. These competitive advantages could arise from economies of scale, but are also commonly associated with the excess capacity of capital held by incumbent firms, which allows them to engage in temporarily loss-inducing behaviour to force any potential competitor out of the market.

The distinguishing characteristic of a duopoly is a market featuring solely two firms. Competition in a duopoly can vary due to what is being set in the market: price or quantity (see Cournot competition and Bertrand competition). It is generally agreed that a duopoly will feature higher barriers to entry than an oligopoly, as firms within a duopoly have a greater potential for absolute advantage with respect to demand.

A market with a monopolistic firm will often have very high to absolute barriers to entry. The incumbent firm can obtain tremendous profits through a pure monopoly market, therefore there are very large incentives for the creation of strategic barriers, as they want to continue to earn excess profits in the short and long term. These barriers can take several forms, including cost advantage, advertising, and strategic reaction in the form of temporary deviation from equilibrium behaviour.

== Barriers to entry in non-economic areas ==
For political parties the electoral threshold is a barrier to entry to the political competition. One dataset with barriers to entry to the political competition by country is the "Barriers to parties" indicator in V-Dem Democracy indices.

== See also ==
- Anti-competitive practices
- Asset poverty
- Barriers to exit
- Brand awareness
- Exclusive dealing
- Information asymmetry
- Overchoice
- Starting a Business Index
- Strategic entry deterrence
- Vendor lock-in
- Zero-profit condition
