= Switching barriers =

Economic & psychological costs of switching from one alternative to another

Switching barriers or switching costs are terms used in microeconomics, strategic management, and marketing. They may be defined as the disadvantages or expenses consumers feel they experience, along with the economic and psychological costs of switching from one alternative to another. For example, when telephone service providers also offer Internet access as a package deal they are adding value to their service. A barrier to switching is then formed as swapping internet services providers is a time-consuming effort.

Switching cost or switching barriers are the expenses or cost that a consumer incurs due to the result of changing brand, suppliers, or products. Although most common switching costs are monetary in nature, there are also psychological, effort-based, and time-based switching costs.

There are a range of different switching costs that fall under three main categories: procedural switching barriers, financial switching barriers, and relational switching barriers. Procedural switching barriers refer to the time and resources associated with changing to a new provider; financial switching barriers refer to the loss of financially measurable resources; and relational switching barriers look at the emotional inconvenience from the breaking of bonds and loss of identity.

== Types of switching barriers ==
=== Procedural switching barriers ===
Procedural switching barriers emerge from the buyer's decision-making process and the execution of their decision. Procedural switching barriers consist of: economic risk, learning, and setup costs, evaluation, this type of switching cost primarily involves the expenditure of time and effort. There are a number of switching costs or facets that fall under procedural switching barriers. Uncertainty costs refer to the perceived likelihood of acquiring a lesser performance and quality when switching. They have the potential to prevent a customer from switching. Pre-switching search and evaluation costs refer to the time and effort costs associated with the search and evaluations required to make a switching decision. Post-switching behavioural and cognitive costs envision the time and effort needed to become familiar with a new service routine when switching occurs. Setup costs refer to the time and effort costs related to the process of establishing a new product for initial use or forming a relationship with a new provider.

=== Financial switching barriers ===
Financial switching barriers involve the loss of financially measurable resources. There are two facets of financial switching barriers. Sunk costs are the considerations of costs and investments already incurred in initiating and maintaining relationships. Lost performance costs refer to the perceived liberties and benefits lost as a result of switching. Large lines of credit also act as financial switching barriers when customer lose the offer of large trade credit from incumbent or existing supplier.

=== Relational switching barriers ===
Relational switching barriers include the psychological or emotional discomfort caused by terminating a relationship and the breaking of bonds, along with the time and effort involved in and forming a new relationship. There are two facets of relational switching barriers. Brand relationship loss costs are the losses associated with severing the bonds of identification that have been developed alongside the brand with which a customer has associated. These bonds are lost when switching providers. Personal relationship loss costs are the losses and discomfort associated with switching to a provider that a consumer is not familiar with, as familiarity creates comfort for the consumer.

=== Collective switching barriers ===
Collective switching costs are a unique macro form of switching barriers, appearing when the market presents collective externalities towards a service or product, and represents the combined switching costs of all entities in the market. These costs affect the competition by improving incumbents and withholding new entrants into the market, who must overcome individual and collective switching costs to advance in the market. In the presence of the product/ service externalities, participation in the dominant product or service provides the most value, while at the same time, it increases the value of the product or service. As a group, entities face collective switching costs that surpass the sum of the individual costs, because unless a coordinated desertion takes place, any individual deserter finds themselves cut out of the collective use of the product / service and its benefits.

== See also ==
- Barriers to entry
- Barriers to exit
- Closed platform
- Job lock
- Porter 5 forces analysis
- Transaction cost
- Vendor lock-in
