= Barriers to exit =

In economics, barriers to exit are obstacles in the path of a firm that wants to leave a given market or industrial sector. These obstacles often have associated costs, prohibiting the firm from leaving the market. If the barriers of exit are significant, a firm may be forced to continue competing in a market. This forced stay in the market occurs when the costs of leaving a market are higher than costs incurred by continuing in the market. Sometimes, when firms operate at low profit or at loss, they still choose to compete with others. Major factors of this decision making is high barriers to exit.

== Definitions ==
There are various definitions of "barrier to exit", this means the absence of one common approach to define barriers to exit.

In 1976, Porter defines "exit barriers" as "adverse structural, strategic and managerial factors that keep firms in business even when they earn low or negative returns.”

In 1989, Gilbert used the definition “costs or forgone profits that a firm must bear if it leaves the industry...Exit barriers exist if a firm cannot move its capital into another activity and earn at least as large a return”. Direct costs of exit and indirect opportunity costs of exit are covered in this definition.

In 2021, Will Kenton gives a very clear definition which states, "Barriers to exit are obstacles or impediments that prevent a company from exiting a market in which it is considering cessation of operations, or from which it wishes to separate." Kenton mentions how "Barriers to exit can be compared with barriers to entry."

All of the above definitions describe barriers to exit as obstacles that may force a firm to continue operating in a market or a consumer to continue using a firm.

== Types of barriers ==
There is a variety of factors that can affect the ease of exit. Type of barriers to exit can mainly divided into direct exit costs and indirect opportunity costs of exit.

Direct exit costs:

- Labor related exit costs. Costs related to protect employees’ contractual rights for example, staff redundancy costs and insurance benefits.
- Regulatory exit requirements. Some costs that require firm to comply in order to exit market. For example, remediation costs due to environmental regulations.
- High fixed exit costs. "can include loans, which the company pays back over time, property costs, vehicle costs or any settlement packages for investors or employees."

Indirect opportunity costs of exit:

- Sunk costs. Barrier to exit for incumbent firms since the committed assets represent non-recoverable costs. Examples of sunk costs including assets specificity, advertisement campaigns and promotions, research and development costs, and prepaids.
- Long-term contracts. Some long-term contracts with buyers or suppliers can be barriers to exit as the penalty for not fulfilling the contracts may be costly.

Other factors that may form a barrier to exit include:

- Potential upturn. Firms may be influenced by the potential of an upturn in their market that may reverse their current financial situation.
- Government and social restrictions. Often based on government concerns for job losses and regional economic effects.
- Loss of customer goodwill
- Costly Equipment which requires a large investment up front that can only perform very specific tasks

== Relationship between barriers to exit and barriers to entry ==
Eaton and Lipsey (1980) pointed out that barriers to exit are barriers to entry.

Barriers to exit are obstacles or impediments that prevent a company from exiting a market or industry. These are common occurrences that typically only delay an exit, and they often have simple solutions.

There are two reasons to believe that such interdependence exists. Both reasons are related to new entrants and incumbents.

- First-mover advantages. Investments by incumbent firms in durable and specific assets may create first-mover advantages, this create barrier to entry for new entrants. It also limits the potential for displacement.
- Sunk costs. Sunk cost is barrier to entry, and it provides incumbents with an advantage. Sunk cost is also barrier to exit since the sunk cost represent non-recoverable costs.

== Implications ==
As more firms are forced to stay in a market, competition increases within that market. This negatively affects all firms in the market and profits may be lower than in a perfectly competitive market.

"High barriers to exit might hurt existing companies but might also create opportunities for new companies looking to enter the sector." Competitive markets create barriers to entry and exit, but the high barrier of exit to leave a market can create circumstances that open up the market for new firms that could not afford the high cost of entry prior to the existing firm's exit.

== Examples ==
Exit barriers are especially high in the airline industry. Passenger airplanes are specialized assets in the airline industry because passengers airplanes have no use in other markets. Due to the dramatically decreasing demand for air-travel due to the coronavirus pandemic, as well as the travel bans instated in many countries, many airline companies were operating at low profit or at a loss. However, due to high exit barriers, many airline companies have chosen to continue to operate and compete in airline industry despite the pandemics continuing negative effects on the airline industry.

As an illustrative example, suppose Delta Air Lines wants to exit its business but has a significant amount of debt owed to investors. They used the investor funds to purchase airplanes. Airplanes can only be used by the airline industry, classifying them as specific assets. Depending on the age of the planes, the assets might have a low scrap value. As a result, Delta might have a difficult time finding a buyer for the planes, leaving them unable to payoff the debt and exit the industry. The most feasible solution would be to find a competitor in the industry that had the capital to buy the fleet or opt to request financial assistance from the government.

"Banks are often considered necessary for lending and promoting economic growth in a region. If there are not enough banks or competition in an area, the government might block the sale of a bank to another party." In this instance, despite the bank wanting to leave the market, governmental regulations place a barrier to exit.

Technology firms, such as Apple have "low barriers to entry and high barriers to exit, exacting steep switching costs on users who dare to defect." Leaving the Apple platform of technology would cause a customer to lose all of their downloaded content, including music, movies, applications, games, and more critical date such as virtual panic buttons or schedules. The investment of the consumers time and energy is lost if they choose to make the switch from Apple devices to android devices.

== Market structure ==
Perfect competition - free entry and exit

Monopolistic competition - free entry and exit

These two types of markets are the only types of markets that face low entry/exit barriers, as other markets do not allow for firms to enter and exit at will.

== See also ==
- Barriers to entry
- Market power
- Switching barriers (or switching costs)
