= Predatory pricing =

Deliberately undercutting prices to eliminate competition

Predatory pricing, also known as price slashing, is a commercial pricing strategy which involves reducing the retail prices to a level lower than competitors to eliminate competition. Selling at lower prices than a competitor is known as undercutting. This is where an industry dominant firm with sizable market power will deliberately reduce the prices of a product or service to loss-making levels to attract all consumers and create a monopoly. For a period of time, the prices are set unrealistically low to ensure competitors are unable to effectively compete with the dominant firm without suffering a substantial loss. The aim is to force existing or potential competitors within the industry to abandon the market so that the dominant firm may establish a stronger market position and create further barriers to entry. Once competition has been driven from the market, consumers are forced into a monopolistic market where the dominant firm can safely increase prices to recoup its losses.

The critical difference between predatory pricing and other market strategies is the potential for consumer harm in the long-term. Despite the initial buyer's market created through firms' competing for consumer preference, as the price war favours the dominant firm, consumers will be forced to accept fewer options and higher prices for the same goods and services in the monopolistic market. If the strategy is executed successfully, predatory pricing can cause consumer harm and is, therefore, considered anti-competitive in many jurisdictions, making the practice illegal under numerous competition laws.

== Concept ==
Predatory pricing is split into a two-stage strategy.

The first stage of predatory pricing (predation) involves the dominant firm offering goods and services at below-cost rate which, in turn, leads to a reduction in the firm's immediate short-term profits. This drop in price forces the market price for those goods or services to readjust to this lower price, putting smaller firms and industry entrants at risk of exiting the industry. The principle behind this strategy is that, unlike new entrants and current players, the dominant firm has the size and capital to sustain short-term loss in profits, thus forcing a game of survival that the dominant firm is likely to win.

The second stage is the recoupment, during which the dominant firm readjusts its product and service prices to approach monopoly prices (or a monopoly price, depending on remaining industry players and the dominant firm's market share) to recover its losses in the long-term. This price adjustment can put consumers under pressure, as they are now forced to accept the higher price without any fair-priced competition, thus resulting in consumer harm. This is what differentiates predatory pricing from normal competitive pricing. Under EU law, the European Commission can account for recoupment as a factor when determining whether predatory pricing is abusive. This is because predatory pricing can only be considered economically effective if a firm can recover its short-term losses from pricing below the average variable cost (AVC). However, recoupment is not a precondition for establishing whether predatory pricing is an abuse of dominance under Article 102 TFEU. Assessing other factors, such as barriers to entry, can suffice in demonstrating how predatory pricing can lead to foreclosure of competitors from the market.

The use of predatory pricing to gain a foothold in a market in one territory while maintaining high prices in the suppliers' home market (also known as "dumping") creates a risk that the loss-making product will find its way back to the home market and drive down prices there. This can result in negative effects on the home market and cause harm to domestic supplies and producers. Due to this, countries often have laws and regulations to prevent dumping and other forms of predatory pricing strategies that may distort trade.

== Legal features ==
1. The principal aspect of predatory pricing is that the seller in the market has a certain economic or technical strength which distinguishes it from price discrimination, where competition exists amongst both buyers and sellers.

2. The geographic market for predatory pricing is the country's domestic market which differentiates it from "dumping". Dumping refers to the practice of selling commodities in overseas markets at a lower price than within the domestic market. Though it can be determined that both concepts have similarities in terms of "low-cost sales" and "exhaustion of competitors", numerous differences have been noted:

(1) The scopes of application of the two are different. Predatory pricing applies to domestic trade, while dumping applies to international trade.

(2) The identification standards of the two are different. Predatory pricing is based on cost, while dumping is based on the price applicable to the normal trading of similar domestic products.

(3) The laws applicable to both are different. Predatory pricing mainly falls under domestic laws, while dumping falls to international treaties or the laws of other countries.

(4) The consequences of the two are different. Legal sanctions for predatory pricing are compensatory damages or administrative penalties, while dumping involves the levying of anti-dumping duties.

3. The objective performance of predatory pricing is that a company temporarily sells goods or services below cost to eliminate competitors from a certain market and create exclusivity. The predatory pricing company can then sell goods and services at monopoly prices to compensate for the losses from initial low price sales.

4. A dominant firm's subjective intention may be to eliminate competition to gain a monopoly advantage. Under EU law, if a dominant firm prices above AVC but below Average Total Costs (ATC), proving intention can be useful evidence for finding predatory pricing. However, the difficulty is faced when distinguishing between an intention to eliminate competitors and an intention to win the competition. Thus, the European Commission does not have to establish an undertaking's subjective intention to prove that Article 102 applies, as abuse is an objective rather than a subjective concept.

== Implementation conditions ==
1. Sacrificing short-term profits

The economic theory of predatory pricing involves a company pricing its goods and services to generate less revenue in the short term, thus, eliminating competitors and increasing market power. The theory does not explicitly state that profits must be negative in order for this to be achieved. In anti-monopoly law enforcement, determining the level of pricing that constitutes predatory pricing can be difficult in operation. The generally acceptable standard is that during a period of predatory prices, the predator's profit will be negative where the price is lower than the initial cost. However, with this the question arises as to what kind of cost should be used as a reference. The use of a price that is lower than the cost may make certain predatory pricing practices not legally binding.

According to the theory of industrial organization, some predatory pricing practices may not necessarily lead to negative short-term profits. However, in this particular case, the company's ability to make low-cost profits can indicate that the company is a highly efficient company compared to its competitors. This does not necessarily indicate that such instances will lead to reduced benefits in the long-term as non-entry of entrants does not necessarily reduce welfare, and entry of entrants does not necessarily improve it. Consequently, anti-monopoly law ignores this and does not result in major welfare losses.

2. The ability of incumbent company to raise prices

An important condition for predatory pricing is that, after excluding competitors, a dominant firm can raise prices to compensate for their short-term losses. To achieve this, market power can be an important factor. However, under EU law, market power is not necessary to establish predatory pricing, since other factors such as barriers to entry can indicate an abuse of a dominant position.

It is also important to note the barriers to entry impact on a dominant firm's ability to raise the price of their goods and services. On the exclusion of these barriers, other firms could theoretically enter any market where an incumbent firm is enjoying economic profits, thereby preventing the dominant firm from sufficiently raising prices high enough to recoup the costs of lowering price.

== Theories for controlling predatory pricing ==
It can be difficult to identify when normal price competition turns into anti-competitive predatory pricing. Therefore, various rules and economic tests have been established to identify predatory pricing.

=== No rule ===
According to Easterbrook, predatory pricing is rare and should not be considered a central concern. Introducing laws against predation, especially because it is rare, could lead to generating false positive errors, which would restrict the rule. The main point of the argument is that government intervention is dispensable, as predation is unlikely to succeed and creates a deterrent effect on its own. The deterrent effect results from selling goods and services below the costs, which causes losses without the gain in market power. In this case, the market power does not increase due to the market share holder weathering the predatory strategy. Thus, the firm punished itself by taking losses without gaining market share. As a consequence, this acts a deterrent for other firms. An additional argument against the implementation of rules is the inability of courts or competition authorities to differentiate predatory from competitive prices.

=== Short-term loss rules and the Areeda-Turner test ===
In 1975, Phillip Areeda and Donald Turner developed a short-run cost-based test, widely referred to as the 'Areeda-Turner rule'. The rules are based on short term focus due to the long run focus being too speculative and inefficient. The Areeda-Turner rule suggests prices at or above reasonable expected average variable costs (AVC) are presumed to be lawful, but prices below AVC are presumed to be unlawful and anti-competitive.

In EU law, the approach to testing for predatory pricing under Article 102 of the Treaty on the Functioning of the European Union (TFEU) has been explained in a number of important cases.

In ECS/AKZO, the European Commission did not adopt the Areeda-Turner rule. The Court of Justice upheld this decision for the inclusion of other factors (such as proof of intention to eliminate competition) to be taken into consideration alongside a cost-based analysis. Instead, the Court in AKZO suggested that if a dominant firm sets prices below AVC, the predatory pricing is presumed to be abusively predatory due to the assumed intention to eliminate competitors rather than maximize profits. However, a strategy would not be presumed predatory were a dominant firm to set prices above AVC but below ATC unless evidence were provided to show dominant firm's plan to eliminate competition. Additionally, if a dominant firm sets prices above ATC, the firm is most commonly not found guilty of predatory pricing, though, still may be proven anti-competitive if potential for substantial consumer harm is discovered. The AKZO test was reaffirmed in Tetra Pak II, and France Télécom.

In Post Danmark I, the Court of Justice developed upon AKZO by stating that prices above average incremental costs but below ATC would not likely be ruled abusive under Article 102 of the TFEU if there was no evidence the dominant firm deliberately intended to eliminate competition.

=== Long-term cost-based rule ===
Posner's long-term cost-based rule assumes that long-run marginal costs are a more reliable test of predation than short-run costs. This is due to the predator, who prices at short-run marginal cost, having the ability to eliminate competitors that cannot afford the same losses in the short-run. To determine predation, Posner brought forth a test that substitutes the average costs from the firm's balance sheet to establish a test that relates to the full average costs based on the company's books. The test would include certain prerequisites, an intent element, as well as a defense. As a prerequisite, Posner requires the plaintiff to demonstrate that the market was predestined for effective predatory pricing. As indicators, Posner lists, for instance, that the predator operates in various markets, whereas the prey operates in fewer markets, concentrated markets, slow entry, few fringe firms, homogenous products and numerous buyers. Posner would authorize the firm to defend due to changes in supply or demand, allowing the respondent firm to price its products at short-run marginal cost.

According to the European Commission's "Guidance on the Commission's Enforcement Priorities in Applying Article 82 of the Treaty to Abusive Exclusionary Conduct by Dominant Undertakings", if a dominant firm does not cover its average avoidable costs or long-run average incremental costs, this implies the dominant firm is operating at a loss in the short-term to foreclose equally efficient competitors from the market. The Guidance does not bind the EU Courts, however, it is an important document that could influence future decisions.

=== Rules governing price increases after predation ===
William Baumol proposed a long-term rule seeking to avoid full reliance on cost-based tests to determine predatory pricing. Baumol's rule involves requiring any price cut made in response to entry to continue for a five-year period after the exit of the entrant (i.e., if an incumbent firm cuts its price to drive out an entrant, the incumbent firm is prevented from increasing price for five years). This rule significantly diminishes the incentive of a firm to engage in predatory pricing since the predatory firm cannot reap the benefits of its anti-competitive behavior (monopoly profits) during the five-year period. Baumol's proposed rule is not absolute, however, it does offer the predator some freedom to raise its post-exit price if the price increase is justified by demonstrable changes in the firm's costs or market demand.

=== Further strategies ===
==== Industry-specific rules ====
Craswell and Fratrik suggest that establishing a legal standard to detect predatory pricing in the retail industry is unnecessary and should not amount to an antitrust violation. The primary reasoning was that predatory pricing typically requires strong barriers to entry to generate profits in the long run, which are absent in the retail grocery industry. When low-cost warehouse stores enter the market, supermarkets often reduce their prices to eliminate this competition or discourage them from expansion. However, Craswell and Fratrik suggest that this may not be predatory pricing, but rather incumbent firms engaging in non-predatory price cuts required for ordinary competition.

==== Rule of reason test ====
Section 1 of the Sherman Act Antitrust Act of 1890 prohibits 'every contract, combination in the form of trust or otherwise, or conspiracy, in restraint of trade or commerce.' However, Courts have adopted the rule of reason test to analyze the effects of a restraint of trade on competition. Recent case law suggests that there is a four-step rule of reason test. First, the plaintiff must demonstrate an "anti-competitive effect". Second, the defendant must show a "legitimate procompetitive justification". Third, the plaintiff must highlight that the restraint is not "reasonably necessary" to achieve the defendant's objectives or that there are "less restrictive alternatives". Fourth, the Court will balance the restraint of trade's "anti-competitive effects with its pro-competitive justifications." Failure to satisfy any of these elements will defeat the anti-trust violation claim.

==== Output restriction rule ====
Williamson offers the output restriction rule to restrain dominant firms from engaging in predatory pricing. The rule stipulates that upon the entry of a new firm in a market, a dominant firm cannot abuse their position by increasing their output above the pre-entry level. A prevention period of 12 to 18 months should be adequate for new entrants to establish a market identity and understand economies of scale while disincentivizing dominant firms from holding excess capacity. Williamson suggests that the output restriction rule possesses greater welfare properties than the short-run marginal cost rule or short-run average cost rule.

==== Two tier approach ====
Joskow and Klevorick offer a two-tier approach to identify predatory pricing. The first stage involves an analysis of the structural characteristics of the relevant market and the market power of the firm allegedly engaging in anti-competitive behaviour. The plaintiff must demonstrate that the market in which the behaviour occurred would be prone to predatory pricing and cause losses in economic efficiency. The second stage involves behavioural considerations which may demonstrate predation such as the dominant firm pricing below average variable cost.

The Brooke Group rule

The Brooke Group rule was established by the US Supreme Court in 1993 for the particular case involving Brooke Group Ltd. v. Brown & Williamson Tobacco Corporation. Under this rule, to be found guilty of predatory pricing, the plaintiff was to prove the following:

1. Defendant set prices to below own cost of production.
2. If successful in driving competitors from the market, defendant had high probability of recouping losses through increase in prices in the long-term.
3. Defendant had clear intent to engage in predatory pricing

The first element can be proven with sufficient evidence of defendant's costs in the production of their goods and services. The second element can be proven with evidence of the defendant's barriers to entry, market power and other evidence that would likely lead to the increase in prices in the future. The third element would require direct evidence to clearly demonstrate the defendant's plans to manipulate the market through use of predatory pricing strategy. This may be found through capture of firm's internal documents or plans.

If all elements can be proven with sufficient evidence for each, following the Brooke Group rule, the plaintiff may claim for predatory pricing under the US antitrust law.

== Legal aspects amongst different countries ==
In many countries, there are legal restrictions upon using the predatory pricing strategy as it may be deemed anti-competitive. Although it may not be technically illegal, it can be subject to severe restrictions.

=== Australia ===
In Australia, predatory pricing is addressed by the prohibition on misuse of market power in section 46 of the Competition and Consumer Act 2010 (formerly the Trade Practices Act 1974), although the section does not use the term itself. Since November 2017, the section has prohibited a corporation with "a substantial degree of power in a market" from engaging in conduct that has the purpose, effect or likely effect of substantially lessening competition. According to the Australian Competition and Consumer Commission (ACCC), predatory pricing occurs when such a firm "substantially reduces its prices below its own cost of supply for a sustained period", causing competitors to exit, disciplining them for competing aggressively or deterring new entry; the ACCC notes that low prices benefit consumers "in almost all circumstances", and that the question is whether competition, rather than an individual competitor, is harmed.

Before 2017, section 46 prohibited a corporation with a substantial degree of market power from taking advantage of that power for a proscribed purpose, such as eliminating or substantially damaging a competitor or preventing entry into a market. In Boral Besser Masonry Ltd v ACCC (2003), the High Court of Australia held by six votes to one that a Boral subsidiary accused of below-cost pricing of concrete masonry products had not contravened the section, because it lacked a substantial degree of market power. Chief Justice Murray Gleeson and Justice Ian Callinan wrote that the possibility of recouping losses through later price rises was "not legally essential" to a contravention but "may be of factual importance", and that the company's inability to raise prices above competitive levels "reflected a lack of market strength". ACCC chairman Allan Fels said the decision made the commission "very gloomy" about applying section 46.

Following Boral, Parliament amended section 46 in an attempt to capture predatory pricing. The "Birdsville amendment", proposed by Nationals senator Barnaby Joyce and in force from 25 September 2007, prohibited a corporation with "a substantial share of a market", rather than substantial market power, from supplying goods or services "for a sustained period at a price that is less than the relevant cost" for any of the same purposes. A 2008 amendment added that sustained below-cost pricing could contravene section 46 even if the firm could not recoup its losses. By 2011 the Birdsville amendment had not been tested in the courts.

The 2015 Competition Policy Review, chaired by Ian Harper, found these provisions "cast in language that is difficult to interpret and apply in practice", noting that "cost" was undefined and that pricing below some measures of cost "might be an ordinary business strategy in a competitive market", and recommended re-framing section 46 around an "effects test" that would make them unnecessary. The Competition and Consumer Amendment (Misuse of Market Power) Act 2017 introduced the effects test from 6 November 2017 and removed the specific prohibition on predatory pricing, including the Birdsville amendment.

=== Canada ===
Section 50 of the Competition Act, which criminalized predatory pricing, has been repealed and replaced by sections 78 and 79, which both deal with the matters civilly.

Section 78(1)(i) of the Competition Act prohibits companies from the selling of products at unreasonably low prices designed to facilitate the effect of eliminating competition or a competitor. The Competition Bureau has established Predatory Pricing Guidelines defining what is considered unreasonably low pricing.

=== United States ===
Predatory pricing practices may result in antitrust claims of monopolization or attempts to monopolize. Businesses with dominant or substantial market shares are more susceptible to antitrust claims. However, as antitrust laws are ultimately intended to benefit consumers, and discounting results in at least short-term net benefit to consumers, the U.S. Supreme Court has set high hurdles to antitrust claims based on predatory pricing theory. The Court requires plaintiffs to show a likelihood that the pricing practices affect not only rivals, but also competition in the market as a whole in order to establish there is a substantial probability of success in monopolization. If there is a likelihood that market entrants will prevent the predator from recouping its investment through supra-competitive pricing, then there is no probability of success and the antitrust claim would fail. Additionally, the Court established that for prices to be predatory, they must be below the seller's cost.

The US Department of Justice, however, argues that modern economic theory based on strategic analysis supports predatory pricing as a real problem, and claims that the courts are out of date and too skeptical.

=== European Union ===
Article 102 of the Treaty on the Functioning of the European Union is the relevant statutory provision under EU law for dealing with predatory pricing. According to Article 102:

"Any abuse by one or more undertakings of a dominant position within the internal market or in a substantial part of it shall be prohibited as incompatible with the internal market in so far as it may affect trade between Member States."

If Article 102 is breached by a predatory pricing practice, the European Commission may intervene as they prioritize dealing with "exclusionary abuses" which exclude competitors from the market. According to the 'Guidance in Applying Article 102', the Commission normally intervene in possible predatory pricing cases if a dominant firm aims to maintain or strengthen its market power by "sacrificing" short-term losses to foreclose "as efficient" competitors, or even "less efficient" competitors. The "as efficient competitor" refers to a hypothetical competitor with the same costs as the dominant firm. The "as efficient competitor" test was endorsed in AKZO as the legal standard for assessing predatory pricing under Article 102.

=== India ===
The Competition Act, 2002 outlaws predatory pricing, treating it as an abuse of dominant position, prohibited under Section 4. Predatory pricing under the Act means the sale of goods or provision of services, at a price below cost, as may be determined by regulations, of production of the goods or provision of services, with a view to reduce competition or eliminate the competitors. A contravention of section 4 of the Act is anti-competitive per se, where there is no requirement to prove that the conduct had an anti-competitive effect on the market.

=== Russian Federation ===
Article 10 of the Federal Law No.135-FZ 'On the Protection of Competition' (FLPC) (Russian: ст. 10, Федерального закона от 26.07.2006 N 135-ФЗ "О защите конкуренции") deals with unilateral conduct of economic entities by prohibiting the abuse of a dominant position. The definition of such abuse, as stated in the article, includes "the setting of an unjustified high or unjustified low price of a financial service by a financial entity".

All matters connected with the abuse of the market power are handled by the Federal Antimonopoly Service (FAS). The FAS investigates all alleged violations of the antimonopoly legislation and determines whether a dominant position has been exploited by one of the market participants.

=== United Kingdom ===
Section 18(1) of the Competition Act 1998 prohibits the abuse of a dominant position by "one or more undertakings... if it may affect trade within the United Kingdom." This is commonly known as the "Chapter II prohibition". The section is very similar to article 102 of the Treaty on the Functioning of the European Union governing the anti-monopoly laws within the EU jurisdiction, with the exception of parts regarding the effect on trade within the UK.

=== Germany ===
Sections 19 and 20 of the Act against Restraints of Competition (ARC) prohibit the abuse of a dominant position. Section 19 lists in more detail the entities with market power addressed by the Act. Article 102 of the Treaty on the Functioning of the European Union also applies, although it has some differences with the ARC.

Compliance with the Act is enforced by the German Federal Cartel Office (FCO) (German: Bundeskartellamt). With the FCO as the higher federal authority, there also exist state cartels in each of the federal states of Germany. The FCO is in the area of responsibility of the Federal Ministry for Economic Affairs and Energy (German: Bundesministerium für Wirtschaft und Energie).

=== Austria ===
The European competition law art. 82 EC and § 5 KartG 2005 prohibit a market dominant enterprise, as well as a collective of several dominant enterprises, from intentionally suppressing a competitor or increasing their respective market share by using methods other than those of legal competitive performance. According to the law, predatory pricing is considered a violation if a market-dominant enterprise controls the local market by offering its goods and services at prices below AVC. However, if prices are below ATC, but above AVC, predattory pricing may not be considered a law violation. Furthermore, if market abuse is directed against competitors, and not against suppliers and clients, Austrian law provides provisions under § 1UWG (in connection with §5 para. 1 KartG 2005, if there is a competitive relationship). Additionally, according to §1UWG, predatory pricing can be unconscionable if intended to harm competitors—even without the dominant company incurring losses. Moreover, predatory pricing can be unconscionable according to §1UWG if the dominant firm expels enough competitors from the market to gain enough market share to dictate prices.

=== Denmark ===
According to §6, sec. 1, of the Competition Act (CA), entering into anti-competitive agreements is prohibited. The CA §6 corresponds to art. 81, sec. 1 of the EC- Treaty and prohibits predatory pricing.

=== Greece ===
Generally, Art. 1(1) of the antitrust law (I. 703/1977) prohibits all agreements between undertakings, decisions by associations of undertakings and concerted practices that strive to prevent, restrict, or distort competition in the Greek market. Particularly art. 2(1) of I 703/77 prohibits predatory pricing within Greece.

=== Sweden ===
Under Art. 101 TFEU and Section 6 of the Swedish Competition Act (KL), agreements between undertakings with objectives to effect prevention, distortion or restriction of competition are strictly prohibited in Sweden. Price-fixing agreements (where competitors concur to set prices at an agreed level) between competitors are considered "hardcore" restriction of competition and are prohibited. This does not include other types of price agreements between competitors. These agreements may, therefore, be assessed under rule of reason and can be found permissible if no significant anti-competitive effects are identified.

== Criticism ==
According to economist Thomas DiLorenzo, true predatory pricing is a rare phenomenon and an irrational practice with laws designed to inhibit competition. According to the European Commission, this is because predatory pricing can cause firms to make a loss due to increased output. This stance was taken by the US Supreme Court in the 1993 case Brooke Group v. Brown & Williamson Tobacco. The Federal Trade Commission has not successfully prosecuted any company for predatory pricing since.

Thomas Sowell explains one reason why predatory pricing may not be completely effective:

Obviously, predatory pricing pays off only if the surviving predator can then raise prices enough to recover the previous losses, making enough extra profit thereafter to justify the risks. These risks are not small.
However, even the demise of a competitor does not leave the survivor home free. Bankruptcy does not by itself destroy the fallen competitor's physical plant or the people whose skills made it a viable business. Both may be available-perhaps at distress prices-to others who can spring up to take the defunct firm's place.
The Washington Post went bankrupt in 1933, though not because of predatory pricing. But neither its physical plant, its people, or its name disappeared into thin air. Instead, publisher Eugene Meyer acquired all three-at a fraction of what he had bid unsuccessfully for the same newspaper just four years earlier. In the course of time, the Post became the biggest newspaper in Washington.

Critics of laws against predatory pricing may support their case empirically by arguing that there has been no instance where such a practice has actually led to a monopoly. Conversely, they argue that there is much evidence that predatory pricing has failed miserably. For example, Herbert Dow not only found a cheaper way to produce bromine but also defeated a predatory pricing attempt by the government-supported German cartel Bromkonvention, who objected to his selling in Germany at a lower price. Bromkonvention retaliated by flooding the US market with below-cost bromine, at an even lower price than Dow's. However, Dow simply instructed his agents to buy up at the very low price and then sell it back in Germany at a price still lower than Bromkonvention's. In the end, the cartel could not keep up with selling below cost and had to surrender in the price war. This was used as evidence that the free market is a better way to stop predatory pricing than regulations such as anti-trust laws.

In another example of a successful defense against predatory pricing, a price war emerged between the New York Central Railroad (NYCR) and the Erie Railroad. At one point, NYCR charged only a dollar per car for the transport of cattle. While the cattle cars quickly filled up, management were dismayed to find that Erie Railroad had also invested in the cattle-haulage business, making Erie a buyer of cattle transport, and thus profiting from NYCR's losses.

Sowell argues:

It is a commentary on the development of antitrust law that the accused must defend himself, not against actual evidence of wrongdoing, but against a theory which predicts wrongdoing in the future. It is the civil equivalent of "preventive detention" in criminal cases—punishment without proof.

== Support ==
An article written by heterodox economist Thomas DiLorenzo and published by the libertarian Cato Institute suggests that while a company might be able to successfully price other firms out of the market, there is no evidence to support the theory that the virtual monopoly could then raise prices. This would be due to other emerging firms rapidly entering the market to compete. Such entrances demand substantial capital investments, which would not be repaid for a substantial period of time due to sharp price decreases, provoked by resumption of competition. According to the Chicago School of Thought advocated by Robert Bork, predatory pricing is not always anti-competitive even if it ends a successful strategy. The Court in Post Danmark agreed predatory pricing does not always harm competition because competing "on the merits" to exclude less-efficient competitors can benefit consumers by providing lower prices, improved quality and choice of products and services.

The DG Competition's 'Discussion Paper' states predatory pricing can sometimes be justified as a rational strategy. This is why dominant firms can rebut presumptions of predatory pricing, despite prices falling below the "relevant cost benchmark". For example, dominant undertaking could argue that changing market conditions have caused reduced demand but increased capacity, and therefore below-cost pricing was necessary in the short-term to sell off fresh produce. Although this defense is not commonly accepted due to predatory pricing rarely being the most efficient option, it is still possible for predatory pricing to be considered a rational strategy.

== Examples of alleged predatory pricing ==
- In AKZO v Commission, AKZO was fined €10 million for abusing its dominant position in the organic peroxides market by reducing its prices to loss-making levels, preventing English firm 'ECS' from competing on the polymer market.
- In Tetra Pak v Commission, Tetra Pak was fined €75 million for abusing its dominant position by reducing prices of non-aseptic cartons.
- In Wanadoo Interactive, a €10.35 million fine was imposed on France Télécom's subsidiary, Wanadoo Interactive. Based on AKZO, high-speed residential broadband internet services were priced at levels below AVC until August 2001, and later at around AVC but below ATC.
- In April 1978 Parkwood Eggs, which had 85 per cent of the egg market in the Australian Capital Territory (ACT), obtained an interim injunction in the Federal Court of Australia restraining the Victorian Egg Marketing Board from supplying cut-price eggs to Canberra shops. The board had surplus eggs because of its statutory monopoly in Victoria, and was alleged to be selling them at a predatory price in retaliation for an associated company's activities there. In August 1978 the Full Court largely dismissed the board's appeal; Chief Judge Nigel Bowen found a prima facie case under section 46 of the Trade Practices Act, saying that the board was "taking advantage of its power in relation to the Victorian market by engaging in its price-cutting activities in the ACT".
- In Boral Besser Masonry Ltd v ACCC (2003), the ACCC alleged that a Boral subsidiary had misused its market power by selling concrete blocks, bricks and pavers in Melbourne below avoidable cost from 1994 to 1996, after a new competitor had entered the market. The High Court overturned a finding of contravention by the Full Court of the Federal Court, holding by six votes to one that the company lacked substantial market power and noting that pricing below avoidable cost could be a rational business decision.
- In 2002 the ACCC sued Qantas, alleging that after Virgin Blue entered the Brisbane–Adelaide route in December 2000, Qantas had misused its market power by "capacity dumping": adding a daily flight that increased its capacity on the route by 50 per cent, and matching or undercutting Virgin Blue's fares, knowing that every airline on the route would then operate at a loss until one withdrew capacity. Qantas said it had made a "legitimate, commercially justified, competitive response". The ACCC discontinued the case in November 2003, citing further legal advice, a review of the domestic airline market and the difficulty and expense of such litigation. In 2021 Regional Express accused Qantas of "predatory behaviour" on regional routes; the ACCC investigated and closed the matter in March 2022.
- In ACCC v Cabcharge Australia Ltd, Cabcharge was fined $3 million for engaging in predatory pricing conduct by supplying taxi meters that were below cost and fare schedule updates at no charge. This breached section 46(1) of the Trade Practices Act 1974.
- In MCX v NSE, the NSE abused its dominant position in the currency derivatives segment by waiving transaction and admission fees, thus preventing MCX from competing in the market. This breached section 4 of the Competition Act, 2002 and amounted to a Rs 55.5 crore penalty.
- According to an AP article a law in Minnesota forced Walmart to increase its price for a one-month supply of the prescription birth control pill Tri-Sprintec from $9.00 to $26.88.
- According to a New York Times article the German government ordered Walmart to increase its prices.
- According to an International Herald Tribune article, the French government ordered Amazon to stop offering free shipping to its customers because it violated French predatory pricing laws. After Amazon refused to obey the order, the government proceeded to fine them €1,000 per day. Amazon continued to pay the fines instead of ending its policy of offering free shipping. After a law was created explicitly banning free shipping, Amazon started charging one cent for delivery.
- In a period known as the Darlington Bus War in Darlington, England, Stagecoach Group offered free bus rides to put the rival Darlington Corporation Transport out of business.
- Some have accused Amazon of using predatory pricing to undercut competitors such as Quidsi before offering to buy them out at low cost once their financial future had become bleak.
- Sir Freddie Laker, founder of Laker Airways, sued IATA member airlines British Airways, British Caledonian, Pan Am, TWA, Lufthansa, Air France, Swissair, KLM, SAS, Sabena, Alitalia and UTA for conspiracy to put his airline out of business by predatory pricing. They settled out of court for US$50 million, with British Airways later agreeing to contribute a further $35 million. British Airways also reached a separate out-of-court agreement with Sir Freddie personally for £8 million.
- Ridesharing companies such as Uber and Lyft initially used venture capital funds to keep prices artificially low, outcompeting existing taxi drivers, who need special licenses or training. Once Uber and Lyft dominated the market in a duopoly, they started increasing customer costs with "dynamic" or "surge" pricing. This has been criticized as a classic example of enshittification.

== See also ==
- Penetration pricing
- Price skimming
- Herbert Henry Dow
- Dumping
- diapers.com
- Enshittification
- Externality
- Price discrimination
- Robinson–Patman Act (US Federal law passed in 1936)
- Contestable market
- Limit price
- Low-ball

== EU primary sources cited ==
- Article 102 TFEU
- ECS/AKZO (IV/30.698) Commission decision of 14 December 1985
- Case 202/07 P, France Télécom SA v Commission of the European Communities [2009] ECR I-2369
- Case 85/76, Hoffmann-La Roche & Co. AG v Commission of the European Communities [1979] ECR II-00461
- Case 209/10, Post Danmark A/S v Konkurrencerådet [2012] EU:C:2012:172Case 333/94 P, Tetra Pak International SA v Commission of the European Communities [1996] ECR I-5951
- Case 62/86, AKZO Chemie BV v Commission of the European Communities [1991] ECR I-03359
- Case C-23/14, Post Danmark A/S v Konkurrencerådet EU:C:2015:651
- Wanadoo Interactive (Case COMP/38.233) Commission decision of 16 July 2003

== Works cited ==
- Areeda, Phillip; Turner, Donald (1975). Predatory Pricing and Related Practices under Section 2 of the Sherman Act. Harvard Law Review. 88: 697–733.
- Bork, Robert (1993). The Antitrust Paradox: A Policy At War With Itself. Simon & Schuster. ISBN 0029044561.
- DG Competition Discussion Paper on the Application of Article 82 of the Treaty to Exclusionary Abuses. Brussels: European Commission. 2005. Retrieved April 22, 2020.
- Ekaterina, Rousseva (2010). Rethinking Exclusionary Abuses in EU Competition Law. Hart Publishing. ISBN 9781841139265.
- Guidance on the Commission's Enforcement Priorities in Applying Article 82 of the EC Treaty to Abusive Exclusionary Conduct by Dominant Undertakings. European Commission. February 24, 2009. Retrieved April 22, 2020.
- Jones, Alison; Sufrin, Brenda; Dunne, Niamh (2019). Jones & Sufrin's EU Competition Law: Text, Cases, and Materials. Oxford University Press. ISBN 9780198824657.
- Whish, Richard; Bailey, David (2018). Competition Law. Oxford University Press. ISBN 9780198779063.
- Predatory Pricing. OECD. 1989. Retrieved April 22, 2020.
