= Competitor analysis =

Corporate strategy

Competitive analysis in marketing and strategic management is the assessment of the strengths and weaknesses of current and potential competitors. This analysis provides both an offensive and defensive strategic context to identify opportunities and threats. Profiling combines all of the relevant sources of competitor analysis into one framework in the support of efficient and effective strategy formulation, implementation, monitoring and adjustment.

Competitive analysis is an essential component of corporate strategy. It is argued that most firms do not conduct this type of analysis systematically enough. Instead, many enterprises operate on what is called "informal impressions, conjectures, and intuition gained through the tidbits of information about competitors every manager continually receives." As a result, traditional environmental scanning places many firms at risk of dangerous competitive blindspots due to a lack of robust competitor analysis. It is important to conduct the competitor analysis at various business stages to provide the best possible product or service for customers.

== Competitive analysis ==
One common and useful technique is constructing a competitor array. The steps may include:

- Define the industry – scope and nature of the industry.
- Determine who the competitors are.
- Determine who the customers are and what benefits they expect.
- Determine the key strengths – for example price, service, convenience, inventory, etc.
- Rank the key success factors by giving each one a weighting – The sum of all the weightings must add up to one.
- Rate each competitor on each of the key success factors.
- Multiply each cell in the matrix by its corresponding factor weighting.

Two additional columns can be added. In one column, a company can be rated on each of the key success factors (try to be objective and honest). In another column, benchmarks can be listed. They are the ideal standards of comparisons on each of the factors. They reflect the workings of a company using all the industry's best practices.

== Competitive profiling ==
The strategic rationale of competitor profiling is simple. Superior knowledge of rivals offers a legitimate source of competitive advantage. The raw material of competitive advantage consists of offering superior customer value in the firm's chosen market. The definitive characteristic of customer value is the adjective, superior. Customer value is defined relative to rival offerings making competitor knowledge an intrinsic component of corporate strategy. Profiling facilitates this strategic objective in three important ways. First, profiling can reveal strategic weaknesses in rivals that the firm may exploit. Second, the proactive stance of competitor profiling will allow the firm to anticipate the strategic response of their rivals to the firm's planned strategies, the strategies of other competing firms, and changes in the environment. Third, this proactive knowledge will give the firms strategic agility. Offensive strategy can be implemented more quickly in order to exploit opportunities and capitalize on strengths. Similarly, defensive strategy can be employed more deftly in order to counter the threat of rival firms from exploiting the firm's own weaknesses.

Firms practising systematic and advanced competitor profiling may have a significant advantage. A comprehensive profiling capability is a core competence required for successful competition.

A common technique is to create detailed profiles on each of the major competitors. These profiles give an in-depth description of the competitor's background, finances, products, markets, facilities, personnel, and strategies. This involves:

- Background
  - location of offices, plants, and online presences
  - history – key personalities, dates, events, and trends
  - ownership, corporate governance, and organizational structure
- Financials
  - P-E ratios, dividend policy, and profitability
  - various financial ratios, liquidity, and cash flow
  - profit growth profile; method of growth (organic or acquisitive)
- Products
  - products offered, depth and breadth of product line, and product portfolio balance
  - new products developed, new product success rate, and R&D strengths
  - brands, the strength of brand portfolio, brand loyalty and brand awareness
  - patents and licenses
  - quality control conformance
  - reverse engineering or deformulation
- Marketing
  - segments served, market shares, customer base, growth rate, and customer loyalty
  - promotional mix, promotional budgets, advertising themes, ad agency used, sales force success rate, online promotional strategy
  - distribution channels used (direct & indirect), exclusivity agreements, alliances, and geographical coverage
  - pricing, discounts, and allowances
- Facilities
  - plant capacity, capacity utilization rate, age of plant, plant efficiency, capital investment
  - location, shipping logistics, and product mix by plant
- Personnel
  - number of employees, key employees, and skill sets
  - strength of management, and management style
  - compensation, benefits, and employee morale & retention rates
- Corporate and marketing strategies
  - objectives, mission statement, growth plans, acquisitions, and divestitures
  - marketing strategies

== Media scanning ==
Scanning competitor's ads can reveal much about what that competitor believes about marketing and their target market. Changes in a competitor's advertising message can reveal new product offerings, new production processes, a new branding strategy, a new positioning strategy, a new segmentation strategy, line extensions and contractions, problems with previous positions, insights from recent marketing or product research, a new strategic direction, a new source of sustainable competitive advantage, or value migrations within the industry. It might also indicate a new pricing strategy such as penetration, price discrimination, price skimming, product bundling, joint product pricing, discounts, or loss leaders. It may also indicate a new promotion strategy such as push, pull, balanced, short term sales generation, long term image creation, informational, comparative, affective, reminder, new creative objectives, new unique selling proposition, new creative concepts, appeals, tone, and themes, or a new advertising agency. It might also indicate a new distribution strategy, new distribution partners, more extensive distribution, more intensive distribution, a change in geographical focus, or exclusive distribution. Similar techniques can be used by observing a competitor's search engine optimization targets and practices.

A competitor's media strategy reveals budget allocation, segmentation and targeting strategy, and selectivity and focus. From a tactical perspective, it can also be used to help a manager implement his own media plan. By knowing the competitor's media buy, media selection, frequency, reach, continuity, schedules, and flights, the manager can arrange their own media plan so that they do not coincide.

Other sources of corporate intelligence include trade shows, patent filings, mutual customers, annual reports, and trade associations.

Some firms hire competitor intelligence professionals to obtain this information. The Society of Competitive Intelligence Professionals maintains a listing of individuals who provide these services.

== New competitors ==
In addition to analysing current competitors, it is necessary to estimate future competitive threats. The most common sources of new competitors are:

- Companies competing in a related product/market
- Companies using related technologies
- Companies already targeting the target prime market segment but with unrelated products
- Companies from other geographical areas and with similar products
- New start-up companies organized by former employees and/or managers of existing companies

The entrance of new competitors is likely when:

- There are high profit margins in the industry
- There is unmet demand (insufficient supply) in the industry
- There are no major barriers to entry
- There is future growth potential
- Competitive rivalry is not intense
- Gaining a competitive advantage over existing firms is feasible
- Dissatisfaction with the existing suppliers

== See also ==
- Marketing
- Industry information
- Marketing management
- Marketing plan
- Competitive intelligence
- Porter's five forces analysis
- PEST analysis
