= Price skimming =

Price setting strategy

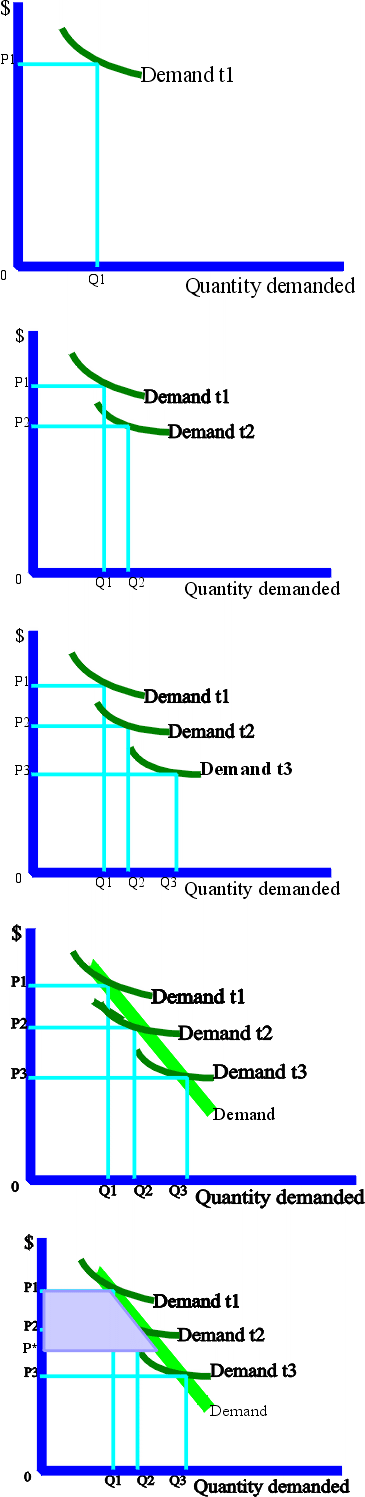
Price skimming

Price skimming is a price strategy where a marketer initially offers an item at a high price so that consumers with the strongest desire and funds to purchase it will, and then as that demand is depleted the price gets lowered to the next layer of customer desire in the market.

A company can use price skimming when launching a product or service for the first time. By following this price skimming method and capturing the extra profit, a firm is able to recoup its sunk costs quicker as well as profit off of a higher price in the market before new competition enters and lowers the market price. It has become a relatively common practice for managers in new and growing market, introducing prices high and dropping them over time.

Price skimming is sometimes referred to as riding down the demand curve. The objective of a price skimming strategy is to capture the consumer surplus early in the product life cycle in order to exploit a monopolistic position or the low price sensitivity of innovators.

The skimming strategy gets its name from skimming successive layers of "cream", or customer segments, off the top of the market, as prices are lowered over time.

== Examples ==
There are many real world examples of price skimming, especially in the technology market.

- Sony's console, the Sony PlayStation 3, initially launched in 2006 for $599 in the United States. Over the release of competitor consoles (Xbox 360, Wii) and the release of next generation consoles (Sony PlayStation 4 in 2013 and Sony PlayStation 5 in 2020) the PlayStation 3 price was gradually reduced and can now be purchased for under $200.

== Limitations of price skimming ==
There are several potential problems with this strategy.

- It is effective only when the firm is facing an inelastic demand curve. If the long-run demand curve is elastic (as in the adjacent diagram), market equilibrium will be achieved by quantity changes rather than price changes. Penetration pricing is a more suitable strategy in this case. Price changes by any one firm will be matched by other firms resulting in a rapid growth in industry volume. Dominant market share will typically be obtained by a low cost producer that pursues a penetration strategy.
- A price skimmer must be careful with the law. Price discrimination (the same seller offering the same product at different prices to different groups) is illegal in many jurisdictions, but yield management is not. Price skimming can be considered either a form of price discrimination or a form of yield management. Price discrimination uses market characteristics (such as price elasticity) to adjust prices, whereas yield management uses product characteristics. Marketers see this legal distinction as quaint since in almost all cases market characteristics correlate highly with product characteristics. If using a skimming strategy, a marketer must speak and think in terms of product characteristics to stay on the right side of the law.
- The inventory turn rate can be very low for skimmed products. This could cause problems for the manufacturer's distribution chain. It may be necessary to give retailers higher margins to convince them to handle the product enthusiastically.
- Price skimming can attract more competition to the market due to firms intrigued by the high price margins and introducing their own product, also eroding the inelasticity of the demand curve.
- Skimming results in a slower rate of product diffusion and adoption. This results in a higher level of untapped demand, giving competitors time to either imitate the product or leapfrog it with an innovation. If competitors do this, the window of opportunity will have been lost. The slower rate of adoption can also have an effect on brand loyalty as fewer customers get their hands on or are aware of the item being sold.
- The manufacturer could develop negative publicity if they lower the price too fast and without significant product changes. Some early purchasers will feel they have been ripped off. They will feel it would have been better to wait and purchase the product at a much lower price. This negative sentiment will be transferred to the brand and the company as a whole.
- High margins may make the firm inefficient. There will be less incentive to keep costs under control. Inefficient practices will become established making it difficult to compete on value or price.
- The lower quantity demand for the item may mean a firm can not take advantage of economies of scale.

== Reasons for price skimming ==
When considering a relatively new product with a limited supply and a short life cycle, price skimming can be introduced as a strategy during the first stage of the product life cycle, because some customers want to be the first to buy the product and are willing to pay the premium. Then the price will go down after a certain selling period, which is also referred to as market exit time.

Price skimming occurs for example in the luxury car and consumer electronics markets. In consumer electronics, there is a confounding factor that there is typically high price deflation due to continual reductions in manufacturing cost and improvements in product quality - for example, a printer priced at $200 today would have sold for a far higher price a decade ago.

The book market often combines price skimming with product versioning in the following way: a new book is published in hardback at a high price; if the book sells well it is subsequently published in paperback at a much reduced price (far lower than the difference in cost of the binding) to more price-sensitive customers. The hardback usually continues to be sold in parallel to those consumers and libraries, that have a strong preference for hardbacks.

== Research ==
In an empirical study, Martin Spann, Marc Fischer and Gerard Tellis analyze the prevalence and choice of dynamic pricing strategies in a highly complex branded market, consisting of 663 products under 79 brand names of digital cameras. They find that, despite numerous recommendations in the literature for skimming or penetration pricing, market pricing dominates in practice. In particular, the authors find five patterns: skimming (20% frequency), penetration (20% frequency), and three variants of market-pricing patterns (60% frequency), where new products are launched at market prices. Skimming pricing launches the new product 16% above the market price and subsequently lowers the price relative to the market price. Penetration pricing launches the new product 18% below the market price and subsequently increases the price relative to the market price. Firms exhibit a mix of these pricing paths across their portfolios. The specific pricing paths correlate with market, firm, and brand characteristics such as competitive intensity, market pioneering, brand reputation, and experience effects.

== See also ==
- Predatory pricing
- Pricing
- Marketing
- Microeconomics
- Business model
- Product differentiation
- Revealed preference
