= Penetration pricing =

Pricing strategy

Penetration pricing is a pricing strategy especially appropriate for new product pricing, where the price of a product is initially set low to rapidly reach a wide fraction of the market and initiate word of mouth promotion. The strategy works on the expectation that customers will switch to the new brand because of the lower price. Penetration pricing is most commonly associated with marketing objectives of enlarging market share and exploiting economies of scale or experience.

== Motivation ==
These are advantages of penetration pricing to the firm:

- It can result in fast diffusion and adoption, which can achieve high market penetration rates quickly and take the competitors by surprise, not giving them time to react.
- It can create goodwill among the early adopters segment and can create more trade through word of mouth promotion.
- It creates cost control and cost reduction pressures from the start, leading to greater efficiency.
- It discourages the entry of competitors. Low prices act as a barrier to entry (see Porter's 5-forces analysis).
- It can create high stock turnover throughout the distribution channel, which can create critically important enthusiasm and support in the channel.
- It can be based on marginal cost pricing, which is economically efficient.

The main disadvantage with penetration pricing is that it establishes long-term price expectations for the product, and image preconceptions for the brand and company. That makes it difficult to eventually raise prices. Some commentators claim that penetration pricing attracts only the switchers (bargain hunters) and that they will switch away as soon as the price rises. There is much controversy over whether it is better to raise prices gradually over a period of years (so that consumers do not notice), or employ a single large price increase. A common solution to this problem is to set the initial price at the long-term market price, but include an initial discount coupon (see sales promotion). That way, the perceived price points remain high even though the actual selling price is low.

Another potential disadvantage is that the low profit margins may not be sustainable long enough for the strategy to be effective.

Price penetration is most appropriate in these circumstances:

- Product demand is highly price elastic.
- Substantial economies of scale are available.
- The product is suitable for a mass market, with enough demand.
- The product will face stiff competition soon after introduction.
- There is not enough demand amongst consumers to make price skimming work.
- In industries in which standardization is important. The product that achieves high market penetration often becomes the industry standard (such as Microsoft Windows) and other products, whatever their merits, become marginalized. Standards carry heavy momentum.

Taken to the extreme, penetration pricing is known as predatory pricing, when a firm initially sells a product or service at unsustainably low prices to eliminate competition and establish a monopoly. In most countries, predatory pricing is illegal, but it can be difficult to differentiate illegal predatory pricing from legal penetration pricing.

When Netflix entered the film distribution market, it had to convince consumers to wait a day or two to receive their movies. To accomplish this goal, it offered introductory subscription prices as low as one dollar. The pricing strategy was so effective that traditional film hire providers such as Blockbuster soon were edged out of the market.

== Research ==
In an empirical study, Martin Spann, Marc Fischer and Gerard Tellis analyze the prevalence and choice of dynamic pricing strategies in a highly complex branded market, consisting of 663 products under 79 brand names of digital cameras. They find that, despite numerous recommendations in the literature for skimming or penetration pricing, market pricing dominates in practice. In particular, the authors find five patterns: skimming (40% frequency), penetration (20% frequency), and three variants of market-pricing patterns (60% frequency), where new products are launched at market prices. Skimming pricing launches the new product 16% above the market price and subsequently increases the price relative to the market price. Penetration pricing launches the new product 18% below the market price and subsequently lowers the price relative to the market price. Firms exhibit a mix of these pricing paths across their portfolios. The specific pricing paths correlate with market, firm, and brand characteristics such as competitive intensity, market pioneering, brand reputation, and experience effects.

== Variants ==
A variant of the price penetration strategy is the bait and hook model (also called the razor and blades business model). A starter product is sold at a very low price but requires more expensive replacements (such as refills) which are sold at a higher price. It is an almost universal tactic in the desktop printer business, with printers selling in the US for as little as $100 including two ink cartridges (often half-full), which themselves cost around $30 each to replace. Thus, the company makes more money from the cartridges than it does for the printer itself.

== See also ==
- Pricing
- Marketing
- Microeconomics
- Outline of industrial organization
- Business model
- Price skimming
- Predatory pricing
- Sales promotion
- Product differentiation
