= Revenue model =

Means for businesses to generate revenues

A revenue model is a framework for generating financial income. There can be a variety of ways for revenue generation such as the production model, manufacturing model, as well as the construction model. A revenue model identifies which revenue source to pursue, what value to offer, how to price the value, and who pays for the value. It is a key component of a company's business model. A revenue model primarily identifies what product or service will be created and sold in order to generate revenues.

Without a clear and well-defined revenue model new businesses will be more likely to struggle. By having a clear revenue model, a business can focus on a target audience, fund development plans for a product or service, establish marketing plans, open a line of credit and raise capital.

== Types ==
The type of revenue model that is available to a firm depends, in large part, on the activities the firm performs, and how it charges for those. Various models by which to generate revenue include the following.

=== Production model ===
In the production model, the business that creates the product or service sells it to customers who value and thus pay for it. An example would be a company that produces paper, who then sells it to either the direct public or to other businesses, thus generating revenue for the paper company.

==== Manufacturing model ====
Manufacturing is the production of merchandise using labour, materials, and equipment, resulting in finished goods. Revenue is generated by selling the finished goods. They may be sold to other manufacturers for the production of more complex products (such as aircraft, household appliances or automobiles), or sold to wholesalers, who in turn sell them to retailers, who then sell them to end users and consumers. Manufacturers may market directly to consumers, but generally do not, for the benefits of specialization.

==== Construction model ====
Construction is the process of constructing a building or infrastructure. Construction differs from manufacturing in that manufacturing typically involves mass production of similar items without a designated purchaser, while construction typically takes place on location for a known client, but may be done speculatively for sale on the real estate market.

=== Rental or leasing model ===
Renting is an agreement where a payment is made for the temporary use of a good, service or property owned by another. A gross lease is when the tenant pays a flat rental amount and the landlord pays for all property charges regularly incurred by the ownership. Things that can be rented or leased include land, buildings, vehicles, tools, equipment, furniture, etc.

=== Advertising model ===
The advertising model is often used by Media businesses which use their platforms where content is provided to the customer as an advertising space. Possible examples are newspapers and magazines which generate revenue through the various adverts encountered in their issues. Internet businesses which often provide services will also have advertising spaces on their platforms. Examples include Google and Taobao. Mobile applications also use this specific revenue model to generate revenues. By incorporating some ad space, many popular apps such as Twitter and Instagram have strengthened their mobile revenue potential after previously having no real revenue stream.

=== Sponsored ranking model ===
The sponsored ranking model is a variant of the Advertising model. The sponsored ranking model is mainly used by search engine platforms like Google and specialized products- and IT-services- platforms where users are offered free search functionality in return for sponsored results in front of other search results. The sponsor is often paying per click, per view or as a Subscription model

=== Commission model ===
The commission model is similar to the markup model as it is used when a business charges a fee for a transaction that it mediates between two parties. Brokerage companies or auction companies often use it as they provide a service as intermediaries and generate revenue through commissions on the sales of either stock or products.

=== E-commerce model ===
This revenue model is the implementation of any of the other revenue models online

=== Fee-for-service model ===
In the fee-for-service model, unlike in the subscription model, the business only charges customers for the amount of service or product they use. Many phone companies provide pay-as-you-go services whereby the customer only pays for the number of minutes he actually uses.

=== Licensing model ===
With the licensing model, the business that owns a particular content retains copyright while selling licenses to third parties. Software publishers sell licenses to use their programs rather than straight-out sell copies of the program. Media companies also obtain their revenues in this manner, as do patent holders of particular technologies.

==== Software licensing model ====
Rather than selling units of software, software publishers generally sell the right to use their software through a limited license which defines what the purchaser can and cannot do with it.

===== Shareware model =====
In the shareware model, users are encouraged to make and share copies of a software product, which helps distribute it. Payment may be left entirely up to the goodwill of the customer (donationware), or be optional with an occasional reminder (nagware), or the software may be designed to stop working after a trial period unless the user pays a license fee (trialware or demoware), or be crippled so that key features don't work. Or it may be a free feature-limited "lite" version (freemium), with a more advanced version available for a fee.

====== Donationware ======
Donationware is a licensing model that supplies fully operational unrestricted software to the user and requests an optional donation be paid to the programmer or a third-party beneficiary (usually a non-profit). The amount of the donation may also be stipulated by the author, or it may be left to the discretion of the user, based on individual perceptions of the software's value. Since donationware comes fully operational (i.e. not crippleware) with payment optional, it is a type of freeware.

====== Nagware ======
Nagware is a type of shareware that persistently reminds (nags) the user to register it by paying a fee. It usually does this by popping up a message when the user starts the program, or intermittently while the user is using the application. These messages can appear as windows obscuring part of the screen, or as message boxes that can quickly be closed. Some nagware keeps the message up for a certain time period, forcing the user to wait to continue to use the program.

====== Crippleware model ======
In software, crippleware means that "vital features of the program such as printing or the ability to save files are disabled until the user purchases a registration key". This allows users to take a close look at the features of a program without being able to use it to generate output.

====== Freemium models ======
Freemium works by offering a product or service free of charge (typically digital offerings such as software, content, games, web services or other) while charging a premium for advanced features, functionality, or related products and services. For example, a fully functional feature-limited ("lite") version may be given away for free, with advanced features disabled until a license fee is paid. The word "freemium" is a portmanteau combining the two aspects of the business model: "free" and "premium". It has become a highly popular model, with notable success.

=== Markup model ===
In the markup model, unlike with previous models, the business buys a product or service and increases its price before reselling it to customers. This model characterises wholesalers and retailers, who buy products from manufacturers, mark up their prices, and resell them to end customers.

==== Wholesale ====
Wholesaling, jobbing, or distributing is the sale of goods or merchandise to retailers; to industrial, commercial, institutional, or other professional business users; or to other wholesalers and related subordinated services. In general, it is the sale of goods to anyone other than the end-consumer. Wholesaling can be implemented online via electronic transactions.

==== Retail ====
Retail is the process of selling consumer goods or services to customers through multiple channels of distribution to earn a profit. Demand is identified and then satisfied through a supply chain. Attempts are made to increase demand through advertising.

===== Brick and mortar retail =====
Conventional retail or brick-and-mortar retail is selling products from a physical sales outlet or store.

===== Mail order =====
The mail order revenue model and distribution method entails sending goods by mail delivery. The buyer places an order for the desired products with the merchant through some remote method such as by telephone call or web site. Then, the products are delivered to the customer, typically to a home address, but occasionally the orders are delivered to a nearby retail location for the customer to pick up. Some merchants also allow the goods to be shipped directly to a third party consumer, which is an effective way for someone to buy a gift for an out-of-town recipient.

===== E-tail =====
E-tail is on-line retail. Retail is the process of selling consumer goods and/or services directly to end consumers to earn a profit. Demand is created through promotion, and by satisfying consumers' wants and needs effectively (which generates word-of-mouth advertising).

In the 21st century, an increasing amount of retailing is e-tailing, done online using electronic payment and delivery via a courier or postal mail. Via e-tail, the customer can shop and order through the internet and the merchandise is dropped at the customer's doorstep. This format is ideal for customers who do not want to travel to retail stores and are interested in home shopping.

The online retailer may handle the merchandize directly, or use the drop shipping technique in which they accept the payment for the product but the customer receives the product directly from the manufacturer or a wholesaler.

=== Subscription model ===
In the subscription model, the business provides a product or service to a customer who in return pays a pre-determined fee at contracted periods of time to the business. The customer will be required to pay the fee until the contract with the business is terminated or expires, even if he is not using the product or service but is still adhering to the contract. Possible examples are flat-rate cellular services, magazines and newspapers.

== Revenue streams ==
A revenue stream is an amount of money that a business gets from a particular source. A revenue model describes how a business generates revenue streams from its products and services. They are resultantly a key aspect of the revenue model. They are generated through the use of the revenue model components listed in the section above. Businesses continually seek for new ways of generating revenues, thus new revenue streams. Finding a new revenue stream has gradually taken on a distinct and specialized meaning in certain contexts to mean a new, novel, undiscovered, potentially lucrative, innovative, and creative means of generating income or exploiting a potential. This approach in particular can especially be applied to new technology and internet businesses which find extremely innovative ways of generating revenues, often ways which seemed not to be possible. As a result, technology-based businesses are constantly updating their revenue models in order to remain competitive. Advertising can be seen as a component of the revenue model, however, when the business is advertising its own products, this would result as a cost for the business which is the exact opposite of revenue. On the other hand, advertising can lead to an increase in sales thus revenue over a period of time. For the majority of businesses which will add value to a product or service that will be purchased by a customer, advertising is often a component of their business plan. Expenditure for this particular component is forecasted as it can generate greater revenues over periods of time.

== Component of a business model ==
A revenue model is part of a business model. A business model shows the framework for an entire business and allows investors and bankers, as well as the entrepreneur, to have a quick way of evaluating that business. Business models can be viewed in many different ways, but they are generally composed of the following six elements:

1. Offer significant value to customers
2. Fund the business
3. Acquire high value customers
4. Deliver products or services with high margins
5. Provide for customer satisfaction
6. Maintain market position

The revenue model is a key component of the business model as it is an essential factor for delivering products or services with high margins and funding the business. Less than 50% of the investment required to set up a business will be used in revenue-producing areas. It can not resultantly be viewed as being identical to the business model as it does not influence all the six elements but more should be viewed as an inner component of it.

Having a well-structured business model is necessary for the success of any business adding value to a product or service for customers. This will consequently include having a clear and tailored revenue model which will ensure its financial health. It provides the owners of the business with a necessary understanding of cash flows as well as how it will generate revenue and maximize profitability. In addition to the business model, financial targets have to be forecasted when creating an initial business plan whereby expected revenues and profits will have to be presented and thus calculated through the use of revenue models applied by the business.
