= Demand shaping =

Influencing of demand to match planned supply

Demand shaping is the influencing of demand to match planned supply. For example, in a manufacturing business, dynamic pricing can be used to manage demand. Dell Inc., is one examples of companies that practice Demand Shaping and dynamic pricing.

== Overview ==
Demand shaping refers to the practice of influencing the demand for a product or service in order to meet the goals of a company or organization. This can be done through a variety of means, including pricing strategies, marketing campaigns, and product design. Demand shaping can be used to achieve a number of objectives, such as increasing sales, reducing excess inventory, and smoothing out fluctuations in demand. It can also be used to improve the overall customer experience and build brand loyalty. One common technique used in demand shaping is price discrimination, which involves charging different prices to different customers or groups of customers for the same product or service. This can be done based on a variety of factors, such as the customer's location, income level, or level of demand.

Other techniques used in demand shaping include bundling, which involves offering products or services together at a discounted price, and segmentation, which involves targeting specific groups of customers with customized marketing campaigns.

== Energy sector ==
Demand shaping also plays a role in the energy industry, where utilities and grid operators use digital tools, pricing signals, and demand-response programs to shift electricity consumption to periods of higher supply or lower system stress. These approaches aim to improve grid reliability, support the integration of renewable energy, and reduce overall system costs.

== See also ==
- Demand management
