= Qcue =

Qcue Inc.
- Type: Private
- Industry: Internet, Computer software
- Founded: Austin, Texas
- Headquarters: Austin, Texas, United States
- Area served: Worldwide
- Website: Qcue.com

Qcue is an Austin-based company that offers dynamic and time-based pricing solutions to live entertainment organizations, enabling to gather information and adjust ticket prices relative to demand. The company was founded in 2007.

== History and clients ==
In 2009, Qcue was the first to introduce dynamic pricing to sports, working with the San Francisco Giants of Major League Baseball, who selected Qcue to implement a pilot program across of 2,000 seats in the View Reserved and Bleachers.

Later in 2009, the Dallas Stars became the first National Hockey League club to launch dynamic pricing.

In 2010, the Giants expanded dynamic ticket pricing throughout the entire venue. Additionally, the Utah Jazz and two other National Basketball Association organizations launched dynamic pricing using Qcue. In July 2010, Qcue partnered with Major League Baseball Advanced Media and Tickets.com to display prices on team webpages. In 2011, additional professional sports organizations signed with Qcue, including the Oakland A’s, St. Louis Cardinals and New York Mets.

At the start of the 2012 season, Qcue had 15 Major League Baseball clients. Additionally, for the first time, dynamic pricing was used during the Major League Baseball postseason by the San Francisco Giants, Oakland A’s and St. Louis Cardinals.

In 2013, the Texas Rangers selected Qcue.

== Awards and recognitions ==
In 2007, Qcue won business plan competitions through the McCombs School of Business Moot Corp and the Rice Business Plan Competition sponsored by the Rice Alliance for Technology and Entrepreneurship.

In 2011, Qcue was named one of Fast Company's 10 Most Innovative Companies in Sports.

In 2013, Qcue was named one of the 50 Most Innovative Companies in the World by Fast Company and the 3rd Most Innovative Company in Sports behind Nike and the NBA.

== See also ==
- Time-based pricing
