= Price war =

Form of business rivalry

A price war is a form of market competition in which companies within an industry engage in aggressive pricing activity "characterized by the repeated cutting of prices below those of competitors". This leads to a cycle, where each competitor attempts to match or undercut the price of the other. Competitors are driven to follow the initial price-cut due to the downward pricing pressure, referred to as “price-cutting momentum”.

While price wars can offer short-term benefits to consumers by providing them with lower prices, they can have a negative impact on the companies involved by reducing their profit margins. Moreover, the negative effects of price wars on companies can extend beyond the short term, as the companies involved may struggle to recover their lost profits and maintain their market share. Firms may be cautious when engaging in price wars as this competition can lead to prices that are unsustainable for long-term profitability.

== Definition ==
The repeated cutting of prices is highlighted in the Merriam-Webster Dictionary definition of a price war.

Heil and Helsen (2001) proposed that a price war exists only if one or more of a set of qualitative conditions are satisfied. These conditions include:

1. a primary focus on competitors rather than consumers
2. undesirability of pricing interactions for competitors
3. absence of intention to start a price war by any competitor
4. violation of industry norms through competitive interactions
5. accelerated pricing interactions in comparison to the usual pace
6. a downward direction of pricing
7. unsustainable pricing interplay.

== Causes ==
The main reasons that price wars occur are:

- Homogenous products: Where products are homogenous, and product substitution between firms is high, then the price elasticity of demand will also be high. As a result, if one company in an industry lowers its prices, other firms offering similar products must also reduce their prices to retain their market share.
- Penetration pricing: If a firm is trying to enter an established market, it may offer lower prices than existing brands to incentivise consumers to switch to their product.
- Oligopoly: If the industry structure is oligopolistic (that is, has few major competitors), the players will closely monitor each other's prices and be prepared to respond to any price cuts.

- Applying game theory, two oligopolistic firms that engage in a price war will often find themselves in a kind of prisoner’s dilemma. Indeed, if Firm A reduces its prices whilst competitor, Firm B, doesn’t reduce its prices, then Firm A can capture market share. And, if Firm A reduces its prices, then Firm B must reduce its prices to avoid being eliminated from the market. The equilibrium is such that both firms adopt a low-price strategy to protect themselves.

- Predatory pricing: One firm substantially reduces its prices for a sustained period below its own cost of supply in an attempt to reduce market competition. Predatory pricing on the international market is called dumping. That is, when a foreign company sells a product in a domestic market at a price below market value, and in doing so, causes injury to the industry in the domestic market.

== Reactions to price challenges ==
The first reaction to a price reduction should always be to consider the following:

Has the competitor decided upon a long-term price reduction or is this just a short-term promotion?

If the competitor has implemented a short-term promotion, the ideal response is to monitor the competitor's price changes and maintain prices at the current level. Price wars often begin when simple promotional activities are misunderstood as major strategic changes.

If the competitor is implementing a long-term price change, the following reactions may be suitable:

- Reduce price: The most obvious, and most popular reaction is to match the competitor's move. This maintains the status quo (but reduces profits pro rata).
- Maintain price: Another reaction is to hope that the competitor has made a mistake, but if the competitor's action does make inroads into a merchant's share, this can soon mean customers lose confidence and a subsequent loss of sales.
- Split the market: Branch one product into two, selling one as premium and the other as basic. This effective tactic was notably used by Heublein, the former owner of the Smirnoff brand of vodka.
- React with other measures - Reducing price is not the only weapon. Other tactics can be used to great effect: improved quality, increased promotion (perhaps to improve the idea of quality).

== Effects ==
Empirical studies suggest that price wars can significantly damage the companies that practice such behaviour. Notably, price wars can have some short term benefits for firms as it allows them to quickly turnover inventory, alleviate financial pressure, increase social purchasing power, and may compel firms to enhance their production efficiency. But these short term gains are ultimately offset by long term losses. In the long run, price wars can cause companies to incur losses in their margins, customer equity, innovation capabilities and competitive advantage. Victims of price wars may be downgraded in the market, and even incur bankruptcy. But the companies that involve themselves in price wars are not the only affected parties, as suppliers and investors will also be impacted. This can lead to compromised company image and reputation over the long run. Overall, society may suffer from less efficient allocation of resources as the resources that were poured into participating in a price war could have been allocated elsewhere. In the short term, consumers appear to benefit from lower prices during a price war. However, in the long run, consumers are likely to form unrealistic reference prices and may be faced with lower quality products.

The international organization ActionAid published a report in 2007 entitled Who pays?, which analysed the impact of supermarket price wars on the income and lives of women in the developing world. The report quoted the words of a banana supplier in Costa Rica:

We are paying for the price wars between supermarkets in your country [UK].

The report was listed for debate under an early day motion in the UK's House of Commons in 2007.

== Examples ==
Price wars are prevalent in many industries, with academic literature citing cases in market segments, including: electricity, telecommunications, automotive, and airlines.

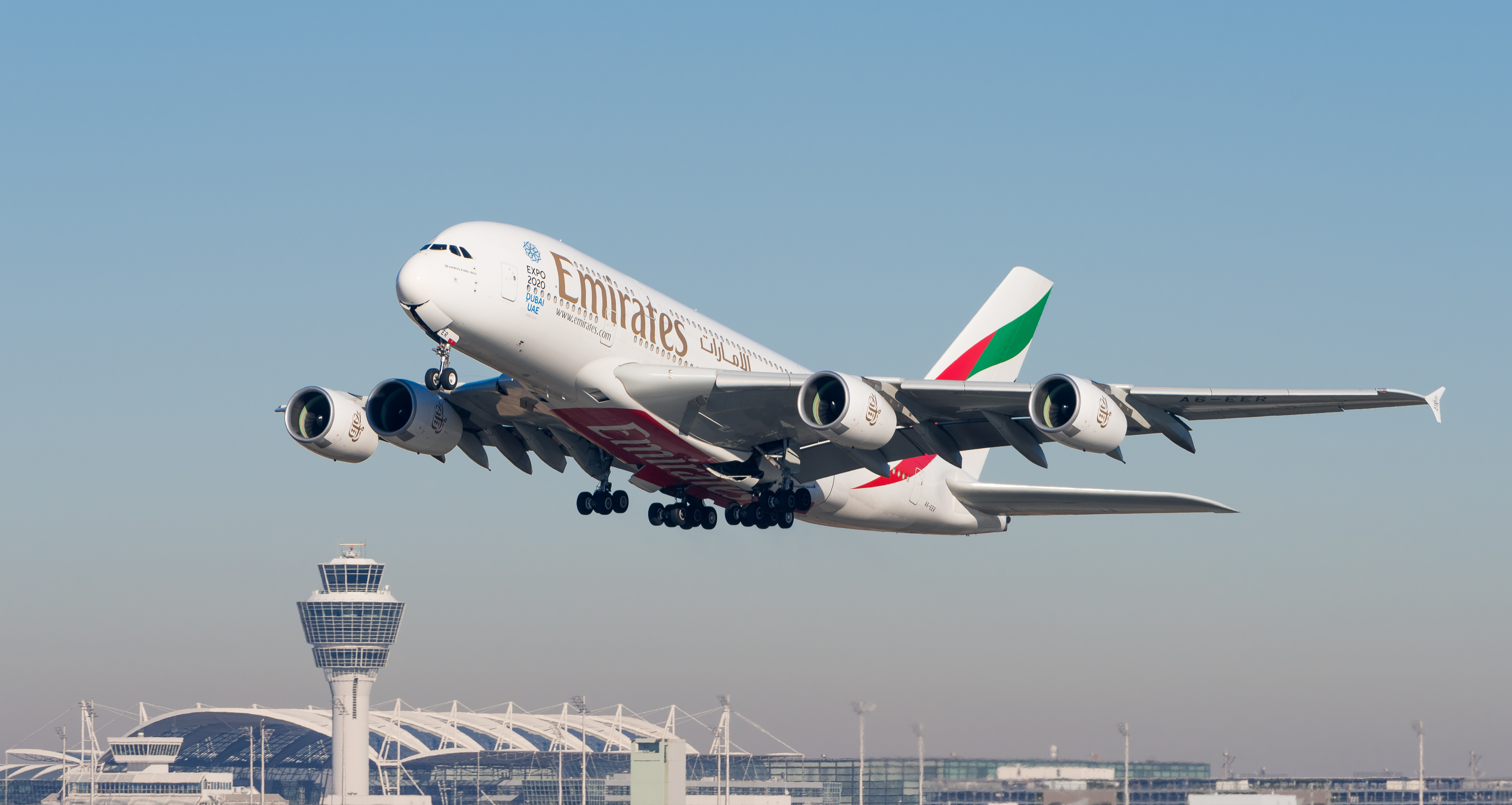
Price wars have been documented in airline markets around the world.

Some key examples include:

- 1992 United States airline price wars: American Airlines, Northwest Airlines, and other United States carriers matched and exceeded the reduced prices of one another, resulting in increased sales volume but record losses.
- 2020 Russia–Saudi Arabia oil price war: In 2020, Saudi Arabia initiated a price war on oil with Russia, which facilitated a 65% quarterly fall in the price of oil. Revenue from oil exports is heavily relied on by many governments, with Iraq, Kuwait, and the Republic of the Congo reporting oil rents (as a percentage of GDP) over 30%. Lower market prices led to reduced profit margins and put financial pressure on such governments.

== See also ==
- Bidding
- Marketing
- Monopoly
- Monopolistic competition
- Oligopoly
- Penetration pricing
- Pricing
