= Price-based selling =

Price-based selling is a specific selling technique in which a business exclusively reduces their price in attempt to close the sales cycle. Price-based selling clearly exists in businesses such as: commodity sales, auto sales, hospitality, and even some retail stores. However, it is only recommended that commodity items like petroleum be sold exclusively by price. Selling on price is even more apparent now in the current US economy as most businesses make the switch to the lowest price approach in attempt to attract more consumers. Car insurance companies like Progressive Auto Insurance advertise specifically with their price, as they promote the amount of money that can be saved by making the switch.

Price-based selling may result in a good or service becoming a commodity and a commodity by definition is a product or service that has no differentiating qualities or characteristics from competing products or services in its class. A survey of Canadian consumers by Wishabi in 2009 finds that only 10% of shoppers see price as the only factor, but a 2007 Shopzilla survey of 2000 shoppers showed that 49% of consumers feel that price was the most important factor in their buying decision. Thus it can be seen that while pricing is not the only factor that matters, it is probably the most important.

== Relationship to sales ==
Most businesses sell their items, whether they are expensive automobiles or inexpensive services, based upon price. They do this not because it is the most profitable, but because they believe it is the easiest way to attract customers. Consumers and business-to-business buyers alike may be easily enticed to buy based upon price. Consumers are always hunting for the best bargain and price has a direct impact on whether or not they will buy a product or service. Businesses know that offering the lowest price gives them a competitive advantage against other similar products the customer may be looking at. Big chains like Wal-Mart and Target have the most control over the pricing in their industry. However, to be able to sell at the lowest price, these chains are continually pushing, if not demanding, that their suppliers give them the lower prices as well.

=== Sales goal ===
The goal of price based selling is to capture the business of price sensitive sellers. Customers who shop purely based on product cost will have the most interest in bargain buys. Pricing is directly related to the revenue management department of a business, and any good revenue manager will make sure they are doing everything possible to maximize profits.

== Examples ==
=== Price-matching guarantees ===
Price-matching guarantees are commonly used in consumer and industrial markets. In the US, Lowe's Home Improvement Warehouse is an example, as the company frequently states that it has the 'lowest' price stores, and that they will match their competitors. Best Buy has always been known for their price-matching guarantee as well. In the UK, Tesco has referred to "price-matching" in relation to Aldi's prices. While a store with price matching guarantees has no fear of losing customers to rivals' price cuts, it has every incentive to raise its own price to charge a higher price to its loyal customers. It is an anti-competitive tactic that warns competitors not to attempt to steal market share by undercutting prices.

Price-match guarantees are also criticized as being misleading to consumers. The guarantees typically require shoppers to provide proof of a lower advertised price on an identical item in stock at a nearby competitor's store before a price match will be approved. However, many big-box retailers work directly with manufacturers and sell products with unique model numbers. As a result, the retailer can deny a price-match request, as no other store carries an "identical" item. Other common reasons for denial: the competitor is not "local," the ad lists a percent discount rather than a specific price, or the customer doesn't offer acceptable proof of the competitor's price. Even if all criteria are met, retailers grant price-matching requests on a case-by-case basis at the discretion of store employees.

=== Price slashing ===
Price slashing, or predatory pricing, is a sales technique that reduces the retail prices to a level low enough to eliminate competition. Businesses will implement this as a way to under-cut the competition and offer the best price to the consumer.

=== Discounting ===
Discounting is something seen in almost every retail store, and grocery store. Discounting is present in just about every business in some way, whether it be coupons, advanced purchases, or bulk buying, businesses are quick to offer a pricing discount. Coupons and promotions give an economic incentive for the customer to use when purchasing a brand. The effect on consumer redemption of coupons has mostly been positive as it attracts customers, and gives them interest in a particular brand. On the other hand, discounting can really hurt a business as seen with Nordstrom this past holiday season. The clothing retailer reported that their fourth quarter earnings fell 68%, in large part due to the heavy discounting. According to a Cornell University study, in the hotel business, discounting in attempt to gain more occupancy does more harm than good, lowering the RevPAR and creating less profit.

=== Haggling ===
Haggling, otherwise known as bargaining, is most common in settings where items have no fixed price. Sellers will often price the item higher than they want to sell it, knowing that buyers are going to want to negotiate the price. The act of haggling has been around since ancient times and continues to this day. It is a common practice in real estate negotiations, car purchases, and at informal flea markets—while it is rarely used in retail settings such as at supermarkets, pharmacies, or brand-name clothing stores.

== Maintaining product integrity ==
If the customers do not find value and integrity in the products they are buying they will be quick to leave for the next lowest price. Selling on pure price turns the product into a commodity. Commoditization does more harm than good for the brand or company selling. A commodity is something for which there is demand, but which is supplied without qualitative differentiation across a market. It is a product that is the same no matter who produces it, such as petroleum, notebook paper, or milk. In other words, copper is copper. Rice is rice. These kinds of items have a set price no matter where you buy. Commodities are and should be sold predominantly upon their price.

=== Products sold primarily based on price ===
There are a select group of products that should be sold based primarily upon their price and this includes all: consumables that have very little direct impact upon the consumer. Examples include items like: sand, gravel, and aggregate used in construction.

With the advent of the Internet, price, service and support are often the only contact points with the customer. Identical products shipped across state lines with no tax have no other differentiators. Refusal to provide an upfront price is very hostile to Internet customers who will purchase a good or service elsewhere.

== Drawback to price based selling ==
When a business specifically cuts prices in order to make a sale, the customer can sense that the original price must be inflated if the business is so quick to slash the price. As a result, the customer may lose respect for the business and realize the prices are too high to begin with. Good customer service must show value to the customers. By cutting the price on one service, the client will most likely think you are willing to cut the price on other products and services. In some cases they may even demand that you do in order to keep their business.

== Other recommended selling techniques ==
Most marketing gurus will lean towards the "sell value, not price" approach when it comes to marketing. This is called value based selling; the business is helping the customer understand what they are purchasing with their dollar, instead of just the obvious product, the sales associate is selling everything the product can do for the customer. Price based selling is arguably a very common approach for businesses, however it should be combined with other approaches, like value selling in order to close the sales cycle.

== See also ==
- Pricing
- Price war
- Commodity
- Discounting
