= Gerard Tellis =

American business studies academic

Gerard J. Tellis is a professor, author, speaker, and thinker. He has a PhD in business from the Ross School of Business at the University of Michigan. He currently holds the Neely Chair of American Enterprise at the USC Marshall School of Business. He is also a distinguished visitor at Erasmus University Rotterdam and the Judge School of Business at Cambridge University, UK. He is one of the world's leading experts in innovation, social media, advertising, and AI applications in business. Google Scholar reports that he has over 200 publications (including seven books). These have currently over 28,000 Google cites. He has won over 25 awards for his publications.
