= Pricing strategy =

Approach to selling a product or service

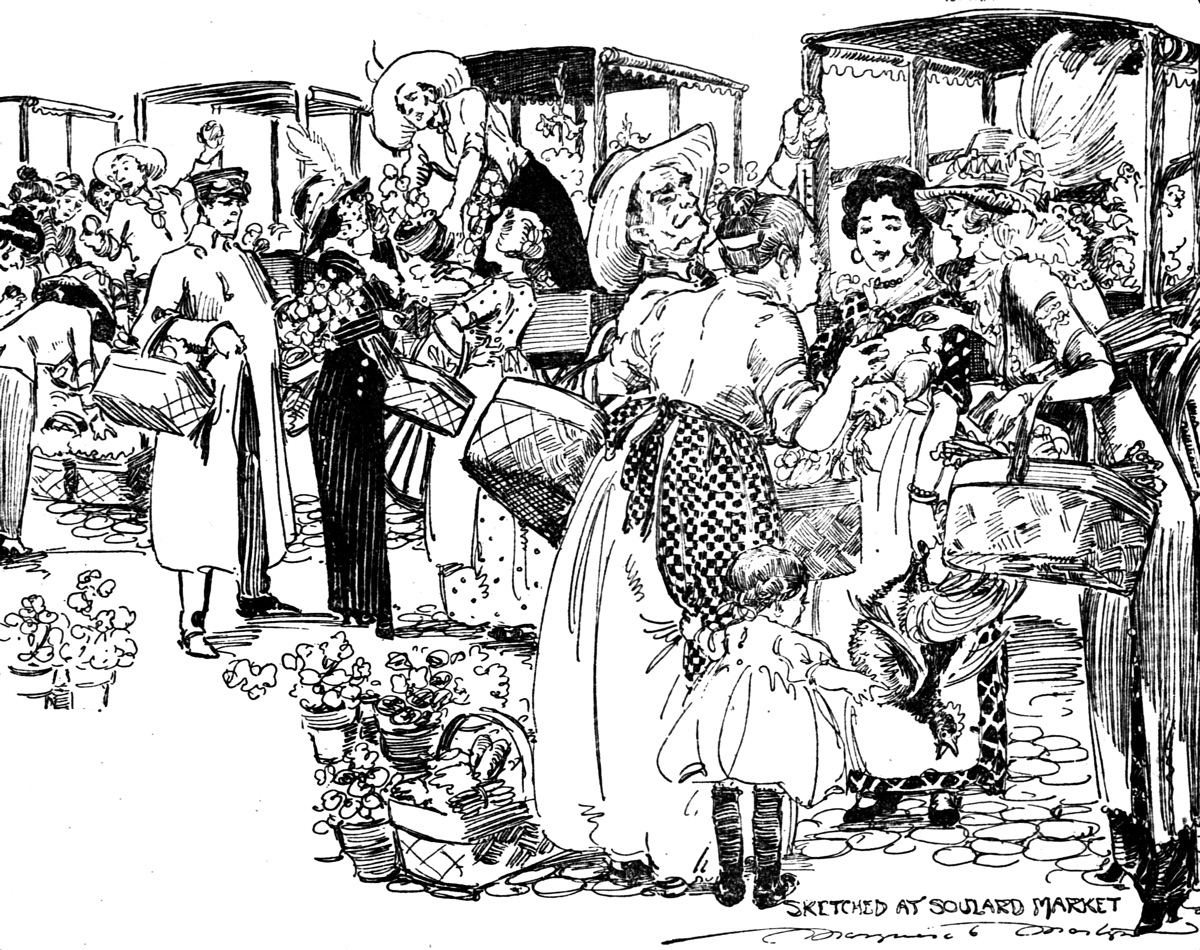
Sales being made at Soulard Market, St. Louis, Missouri, drawing by Marguerite Martyn, 1912

A business can choose from a variety of pricing strategies when selling a product or service. To determine the most effective pricing strategy for a company, senior executives need to first identify the company's pricing position, pricing segment, pricing capability and their competitive pricing reaction strategy. Pricing strategies, tactics and roles vary from company to company, and also differ across countries, cultures, industries and over time, with the maturing of industries and markets and changes in wider economic conditions.

Pricing strategies determine the price companies set for their products. The price can be set to maximize profitability for each unit sold or for the market overall. It can also be used to defend an existing market from new entrants, to increase market share within a market, or to enter a new market. Pricing strategies can bring both competitive advantages and disadvantages to a firm and often dictate the success or failure of a business; thus, it is crucial to choose the right strategy.

== Models of pricing ==
=== Absorption pricing ===
This pricing method aims to recover all the costs of producing a product. The price of a product includes the variable cost of each item plus a proportionate amount of the fixed costs:

$$\text{Unit Variable Costs} + \frac{\text{Overhead} + \text{Managing Costs}}{\text{Number of Units Produced}} = \text{Absorption Price}$$

Fixed or variable costs, direct or indirect costs, employee salaries, utility costs, and other types of costs can also be calculated by applying the absorption pricing method.

=== Contribution profit-based pricing ===
Contribution profit-based pricing maximizes the profit derived from an individual product, based on the difference between the product's price and variable costs (the product's contribution margin per unit), and on one's assumptions regarding the relationship between the product's price and the number of units that can be sold at that price. The product's contribution to total firm profit (i.e. to operating income) is maximized when a price is chosen that maximizes the following:

(contribution profit per unit) × (number of units sold)

=== Contribution profit-based pricing ===
In cost-plus pricing, a company first determines its break-even price for the product. This is done by calculating all the costs involved in the production such as raw materials used in transportation etc., marketing and distribution of the product. Then a markup is set for each unit, based on the profit the company needs to make, its sales objectives and the price it believes customers will pay. For example, if a product's price is $10, and the contribution margin (also known as the profit margin) is 30 percent, then the price will be set at $10 * 1.30 = $13.

=== Cost plus pricing ===
Cost-plus pricing is a cost-based method for setting the prices of goods and services. Under this approach, the direct material cost, direct labor cost, and overhead costs for a product are added together, and a markup percentage is applied (to create a profit margin) in order to derive the price of the product.

=== Creaming or skimming ===
Price skimming occurs when goods are priced higher so that fewer sales are needed to break even. Selling a product at a high price, and sacrificing high sales to gain a high profit is therefore "skimming" the market. Skimming is usually employed to reimburse the cost of investment of the original research into the product: commonly used in electronic markets when a new range, such as smartphones, are first sold at a high price. This strategy is often used to target "early adopters" of a product or service. Early adopters generally have a relatively lower price sensitivity—this can be attributed to: their need for the product outweighing their need to economize; a greater understanding of the product's value; or simply having a higher disposable income.

This strategy is employed only for a limited duration to recover most of the investment made to build the product. To gain further market share, a seller must use other pricing tactics such as economy or penetration. This method can have some setbacks as it could leave the product at a high price against the competition.

=== Decoy pricing ===
Method of pricing where the seller offers at least three products, and where two of them have a similar or equal price. The two products with similar prices should be the most expensive ones, and one of the two should be less attractive than the other. This strategy will make people compare the options with similar prices; as a result, sales of the more attractive high-priced item will increase.

=== Differential pricing ===
Differential pricing occurs when firms set various prices for the same product depending on their consumer's portfolio, geographic areas, demographic segments and the intensity of competition in the region.

=== Double ticketing ===
A form of deceptive pricing strategy that sells a product at the higher of two prices communicated to the consumer on, accompanying, or promoting the product.

=== Freemium ===
Freemium is a revenue model that works by offering a product or service free of charge (typically digital offerings such as software) while charging a premium for advanced features, functionality, or related products and services. The word "freemium" is a portmanteau combining the two aspects of the business model: "free" and "premium". It has become a highly popular model, with notable successes.

=== Good–better–best ===
A seller offers three prices for variations of the same good or service: a "good" no frills version, a "best" premium version, and a "better" version in the middle. Invoking the Goldilocks principle, customers may choose the "better" version because they are willing to pay more than the "good" price, but they are not willing to pay for the "best" version. A notable practitioner of the good–better–best pricing strategy is Apple Inc., which originally sold one model of iPhone in 2007, but by 2020, had adopted the practice of introducing good, better, and best models of iPhone and Apple Watch. Apple's competitors, such as Samsung Electronics, followed suit.

=== High-low pricing ===
A practice whereby many items are regularly priced higher than by competitors, but through promotions, advertisements, and or coupons, lower prices are offered on key items, or where products are sold initially at a higher price and then discounted. The lower promotional prices are designed to bring customers to the seller where the customer is offered the promotional product as well as the regular higher-priced products.

=== Keystone pricing ===
A retail pricing strategy where retail price is set at double the wholesale price. For example, if a cost of a product for a retailer is £100, then the sale price would be £200. In a competitive industry, it is often not recommended to use keystone pricing as a pricing strategy due to its relatively high profit margin and the fact that other variables need to be taken into account.

=== Limit pricing ===
A limit price is the price set by a monopolist to discourage economic entry into a market. It is the price that an entrant would face upon entering, as long as the incumbent firm does not decrease output. The limit price is often lower than the average cost of production or just low enough to make entry unprofitable. The quantity produced by the incumbent firm to act as a deterrent to entry is usually larger than would be optimal for a monopolist, but might still produce higher economic profits than would be earned under perfect competition.

The problem with limit pricing as a strategy is that once the entrant has entered the market, the quantity used as a threat to deter entry is no longer the incumbent firm's best response. This means that for limit pricing to be an effective deterrent to entry, the threat must in some way be made credible. A way to achieve this is for the incumbent firm to constrain itself to produce a certain quantity whether entry occurs or not. An example of this would be if the firm signed a union contract to employ a certain (high) level of labor for a long period of time. In this strategy price of the product becomes the limit according to budget.

=== Loss leader ===
A loss leader or leader is a product sold at a low price (i.e. at cost or below cost) to stimulate other profitable sales. This would help the companies to expand its market share as a whole. Loss leader strategy is commonly used by retailers in order to lead the customers into buying products with higher marked-up prices to produce an increase in profits rather than purchasing the leader product which is sold at a lower cost. When a "featured brand" is priced to be sold at a lower cost, retailers tend not to sell large quantities of the loss leader products and also they tend to purchase less quantities from the supplier as well to prevent loss for the firm. Supermarkets and restaurants are an excellent example of retail firms that apply the strategy of loss leader.

=== Marginal-cost pricing ===
In business, the practice of setting the price of a product to equal the extra cost of producing an extra unit of output. By this policy, a producer charges, for each product unit sold, only the addition to total cost resulting from materials and direct labor. Businesses often set prices close to marginal cost during periods of poor sales. If, for example, an item has a marginal cost of $1.00 and a normal selling price is $2.00, the firm selling the item might wish to lower the price to $1.10 if demand has waned. The business would choose this approach because the incremental profit of 10 cents from the transaction is better than no sale at all.

=== Odd-Even pricing ===
Odd-Even pricing is often used by sellers to portray their products to be either cheaper or more expensive than their actual value. Sellers competing for price-sensitive consumers, will fix their product price to be odd. A good example of this can be noticed in most supermarkets where instead of pricing milk at £5, it would be written as £4.99. Contrarily, sellers competing for consumers with low price sensitivity, will fix their product price to be even. For example, often in upscale retail stores, handbags will be priced at £1250 instead of £1249.99.

=== Pay what you want ===
Pay what you want is a pricing system where buyers pay any desired amount for a given commodity, sometimes including zero. In some cases, a minimum (floor) price may be set, and/or a suggested price may be indicated as guidance for the buyer. The buyer can also select an amount higher than the standard price for the commodity.

Giving buyers the freedom to pay what they want may seem to not make much sense for a seller, but in some situations it can be very successful. While most uses of "pay for what you want" have been at the margins of the economy, or for special promotions, there are emerging efforts to expand its utility to broader and more regular use.

=== Penetration pricing ===
Penetration pricing includes setting the price low with the goals of attracting customers and gaining market share. The price will be raised later once this market share is gained.

A firm that uses a penetration pricing strategy prices a product or a service at a smaller amount than its usual, long range market price in order to increase more rapid market recognition or to increase their existing market share. This strategy can sometimes discourage new competitors from entering a market position if they incorrectly observe the penetration price as a long range price.

Companies do their pricing in diverse ways. In small companies, prices are often set by the boss. In large companies, pricing is handled by division and the product line managers. In industries where pricing is a key influence, pricing departments are set to support others in determining suitable prices.

Penetration pricing strategy is usually used by firms or businesses who are just entering the market. In marketing it is a theoretical method that is used to lower the prices of the goods and services causing high demand for them in the future. This strategy of penetration pricing is vital and highly recommended to be applied over multiple situations that the firm may face. Such as, when the production rate of the firm is lower when compared to other firms in the market and also sometimes when firms face hardship into releasing their product in the market due to extremely large rate of competition. In these situations it is appropriate for a firm to use the penetration strategy to gain consumer attention.

This technique is very common in internet companies, which often don't turn a profit until they've acquired monopoly status, if then, instead putting all their money into expanding market share. It is very cheap to reuse a piece of software, once written, so there are substantial economies of scale that favour this approach, as does the social trap effect (it's hard to leave Facebook).

=== Performance-based pricing ===
A pricing strategy in which the seller is paid based on the effectiveness of its product or service. Examples of sellers who often use performance-based pricing are real estate agents, online advertising platforms, and personal injury attorneys. Performance-based pricing increases the risk of the seller but it creates opportunities for greater rewards. Sellers who use this pricing strategy have an advantage in attracting customers. Performance-based pricing has fewer chances to work if the desired outcome is not clearly defined and quantified between the two parties.

=== Predatory pricing ===
Predatory pricing, also known as aggressive pricing (also known as "undercutting"), intended to drive out competitors from a market. It is illegal in some countries.

Companies or firms that tend to get involved with the strategy of predatory pricing often have the goal to place restrictions or a barrier for other new businesses from entering the applicable market. This strategy may contradict anti–trust law, attempting to establish within the market a monopoly by the imposing company. Predatory pricing mainly occurs during price competitions in the market as it is easier to obfuscate the act. Using this strategy, in the short term consumers will benefit and be satisfied with lower cost products. In the long run, firms often will not benefit as this strategy will continue to be used by other businesses to undercut competitors' margins, causing an increase in competition within the field and facilitating major losses. This strategy is dangerous as it could be destructive to a firm in terms of losses and even lead to complete business failure.

=== Premium decoy pricing ===
Method of pricing where an organization artificially sets one product price high, in order to boost sales of a lower-priced product. Let's say there are two products, beef, and pork. The organization may increase the price of beef so that it becomes expensive in the eyes of the customers. Subsequently, pork becomes cheaper. Customers will then opt for cheaper pork. A limited-edition handbag can be considered as another example of the Premium Decoy Pricing that many bag manufacturers have provided a limited edition choice of bags for customers. The price is usually so expensive that most customers would not be able to purchase it. However, it gives a luxury brand image and helps those manufacturers to build a more affordable handbag.

=== Premium pricing ===
Premium pricing is the practice of keeping the price of a product or service artificially high in order to encourage favorable perceptions among buyers, based solely on the price. The practice is intended to exploit the (not necessarily justifiable) tendency for buyers to assume that expensive items enjoy an exceptional reputation, are more reliable or desirable, or represent exceptional quality and distinction. Moreover, a premium price may portray the meaning of better quality in the eyes of the consumer.

Consumers are willing to pay more for trends, which is a key motive for premium pricing, and are not afraid of how much a product or service costs. The novelty of consumers wanting to have the latest trends is a challenge for marketers as they are having to entertain their consumers.

The aspiration of consumers and the feeling of treating themselves is the key factor of purchasing a good or service. Consumers are looking for constant change as they are constantly evolving and moving.

Examples of premium pricing:

- Ethical consumption
- Fair traders
- Voluntarism

These are important drivers and examples of premium pricing, which help guide and distinguish of how a product or service is marketed and priced within today's market.

=== Price discrimination ===
Price discrimination is the practice of setting a different price for the same product in different segments of the market. For example, this can be for different classes, such as ages, or for different opening times.

Price discrimination may improve consumer surplus. When a firm price discriminates, it will sell up to the point where marginal cost meets the demand curve. Some conditions are required for price discrimination to exist:

1. Firms must face a downward-sloping demand curve, i.e. the demand for a product is inversely proportional to its price.
2. Accurately segment the market, i.e Two or more buying groups must be distinguished at a cost that does not exceed the revenue that distinguishes them.
3. Prevent resale
4. Have market power

There are three different types of price discrimination that revolve around the same strategy and same goal – maximize profit by segmenting the market, and extracting additional consumer surplus.

- First-degree price discrimination
  - The business charges every consumer exactly how much they are willing to pay for the product. Assume the monopolist determines the price of the product based on the maximum amount of money a consumer is known to pay for any quantity of product that is exactly equal to the demand price for the product in order to obtain the total consumer surplus of each consumer.
- Second-degree price discrimination
  - The business uses volume discounts which allow buyers to purchase a higher inventory at a reduced price. While this benefits the high-inventory buyer, it obviously hurts the low-inventory buyer who is forced to pay a higher price. This buyer may then be less competitive in the downstream market. For instance, telecommunications companies charge different prices for customers' monthly Internet access time. They charge a higher price for customers who have small usage whilst charging a lower price for customers who have large usage. In this way, the monopoly seller appropriates a portion of the buyer's consumer surplus for himself.
- Third-degree price discrimination
  - This occurs when firms segment the market into high demand and low demand groups.That is, for the same commodity, a complete monopoly firm implements different prices relying on the different price elasticity of demand in different markets. i.e. the Power plants implement lower prices for more elastic industrial electricity and higher prices for less elastic household electricity.

Firms need to ensure they are aware of several factors of their business before proceeding with the strategy of price discrimination. Firms must have control over the changes they make regarding the price of their product by which they can gain profitability depending on the amount of sales made. The price can be increased or decreased at any point depending on the fluctuation of the rate of buyers and consumers. Price discrimination strategy is not feasible for all firms as there are many consequences that the firms may face due to the action. For example, if a firm sells a product to their customer for a cheaper price and that customer resells the product demanding a higher price from another buyer, then the chances of the firm failing to make a higher profit is predicted because they could have sold their product at a higher rate than the re-seller and made further profit.

=== Price leadership ===
An observation made of oligopolistic business behavior in which one company, usually the dominant competitor among several, leads the way in determining prices, the others soon following. The context is a state of limited competition, in which a market is shared by a small number of producers or sellers.

=== Psychological pricing ===
Pricing designed to have a positive psychological impact. For example, there are often benefits to selling a product at $3.95 or $3.99, rather than $4.00. If the price of a product is $100 and the company prices it at $99, then it is using the psychological technique of just-below pricing. In most consumers' minds, $99 gives the impression of being considerably less than $100. A minor distinction in pricing can make a big difference in sales. The company that succeeds in finding appropriate psychological price points can improve sales and maximize revenue.

=== Sliding scale ===
The economic concept of sliding scale at its most basic: people pay as they are able to for services, events and items. Those with access to more resources pay more and thus provide the cushion for those with less access to pay less, creating a sustainable economic underpinning for said services, events and items.

=== Target pricing business ===
Pricing method whereby the selling price of a product is calculated to produce a particular rate of return on investment for a specific volume of production. The target pricing method is used most often by public utilities, like electric and gas companies, and companies whose capital investment is high, like automobile manufacturers.

Target pricing is not useful for companies whose capital investment is low because, according to this formula, the selling price will be understated. Also the target pricing method is not keyed to the demand for the product, and if the entire volume is not sold, a company might sustain an overall budgetary loss on the product.

=== Time-based pricing ===
A flexible pricing mechanism made possible by advances in information technology and employed mostly by Internet-based companies. By responding to market fluctuations or large amounts of data gathered from customers – ranging from where they live to what they buy to how much they have spent on past purchases – dynamic pricing allows online companies to adjust the prices of identical goods to correspond to a customer's willingness to pay. The airline industry is often cited as a dynamic pricing success story. In fact, it employs the technique so artfully that most of the passengers on any given airplane have paid different ticket prices for the same flight. As of 2018, several third-party tools have allowed merchants to take advantage of a time based dynamic pricing including Pricemole, SweetPricing, BeyondPricing, etc.

=== Time-sensitive pricing ===
Time-sensitive pricing is a cost-based method for setting prices for goods that have a short shelf life. Careful consideration has to be taken to the "Use By" and "Best Before" dates of the products, in relation to the "Mark Up" or "Return" of the products. That is to say the shorter period of time should have a lower Mark-up/Return margin, thus increasing the Turnover/sales of the product, and decreasing the Wastage/loss of products.

=== Value-based pricing ===
Pricing a product based on the value the product has for the customer and not on its costs of production or any other factor. This pricing strategy is frequently used where the value to the customer is many times the cost of producing the item or service. For instance, the cost of producing a software CD is about the same independent of the software on it, but the prices vary with the perceived value the customers are expected to have. The perceived value will depend on the alternatives open to the customer. In business these alternatives are using a competitor's software, using a manual work around, or not doing an activity. In order to employ value-based pricing, one must know its customers' business, one's business costs, and one's perceived alternatives. It is also known as perceived-value pricing.

Value-based pricing have many effects on the business and consumer of the product. Value-based pricing is a fundamental business activity and is the process of developing product strategies and pricing them properly to establish the product within the market. This is a key concept for a relatively new product within the market, because without the correct price, there would be no sale. Having an overly high price for an average product would have negative effects on the business as the consumer would not buy the product. Having a low price on a luxury product would also have a negative impact on the business as in the long run the business would not be profitable. This can be seen as a positive for the consumer as they are not needing to pay extreme prices for the luxury product.

=== Variable pricing strategies ===
Variable pricing strategy sums up the total cost of the variable characteristics associated in the production of the product. Examples of variable characteristics are: interest rates, location, date, and region of production. The sum total of the following characteristics is then included within the original price of the product during marketing. Variable pricing enables product prices to have a balance "between sales volume and income per unit sold". Variable pricing strategy has the advantage of ensuring the sum total of the cost businesses would face in order to develop a new product. However, variable pricing strategy excludes the cost of fixed pricing. Fixed pricing includes the price of dedication received from manufactures in the production of developing the product and other involvement of factors.

=== Yield management strategies ===
Yield management is a strategy which aims to monitor consumer behaviour to gain and achieve maximum profit through selling goods and services that are perishable. The theory behind this strategy is to focus on the following aspects: buying behaviour patterns of consumers, external environmental factors and market price to successfully gain the most profit. This strategy of yield management is commonly used by the firms associated within the airlines industry. For example, a customer may purchase an airline ticket in the day time for $600 and another customer may purchase the same airline ticket on the same day in the evening for $800 – the reason being that during the day time the airline contained many seats that were spare which needed to be occupied and sold. Thus, prices were decreased in order to attract and manipulate the customers into buying an airline ticket with great deals or offers. However, during the evening time most seats were filled and the firm decided to increase the price of the airline ticket for the desperate customers who needed to purchase the spare seats that were available. This type of strategy is a vigilant way of connecting with the target consumers as well as flourishing the business.

== Pricing roles ==
Some organizations delegate pricing responsibilities to a range of departmental staff. In other cases, a Chief Pricing Officer plays a strategic role advising on market conditions on competitive opportunities which can be exploited via pricing decision-making. Where prices are set centrally, they need to make sense to sales staff working in the field.

== Nine laws of price sensitivity and consumer psychology ==
In their book, The Strategy and Tactics of Pricing (2002), Thomas Nagle and Reed Holden outline nine "laws" or factors that influence how a consumer perceives a given price and how price-sensitive they are likely to be with respect to different purchase decisions.

They are:

1. Reference price effect – buyer's price sensitivity for a given product increases the higher the product's price relative to perceived alternatives. Perceived alternatives can vary by buyer segment, by occasion, and other factors.
2. Difficult comparison effect – buyers are less sensitive to the price of a known or more reputable product when they have difficulty comparing it to potential alternatives.
3. Switching costs effect – the higher the product-specific investment a buyer must make to switch suppliers, the less price-sensitive that buyer is when choosing between alternatives.
4. Price-quality effect – buyers are less sensitive to price the more that higher prices signal higher quality. Products for which this effect is particularly relevant include: image products, exclusive products, and products with minimal cues for quality.
5. Expenditure effect – buyers are more price-sensitive when the expense accounts for a large percentage of buyers' available income or budget.
6. End-benefit effect – the effect refers to the relationship a given purchase has to a larger overall benefit, and is divided into two parts: Derived demand: The more sensitive buyers are to the price of the end benefit, the more sensitive they will be to the prices of those products that contribute to that benefit. Price proportion cost: The price proportion cost refers to the percent of the total cost of the end benefit accounted for by a given component that helps to produce the end benefit (e.g., think CPU and PCs). The smaller the given components share of the total cost of the end benefit, the less sensitive buyers will be to the components' price.
7. Shared-cost effect – the smaller the portion of the purchase price buyers must pay for themselves, the less price-sensitive they will be.
8. Fairness effect – buyers are more sensitive to the price of a product when the price is outside the range they perceive as "fair" or "reasonable" given the purchase context.
9. The framing effect – buyers are more price-sensitive when they perceive the price as a loss rather than a forgone gain, and they have greater price sensitivity when the price is paid separately rather than as part of a bundle.
