= Dynamic pricing =

Pricing strategy

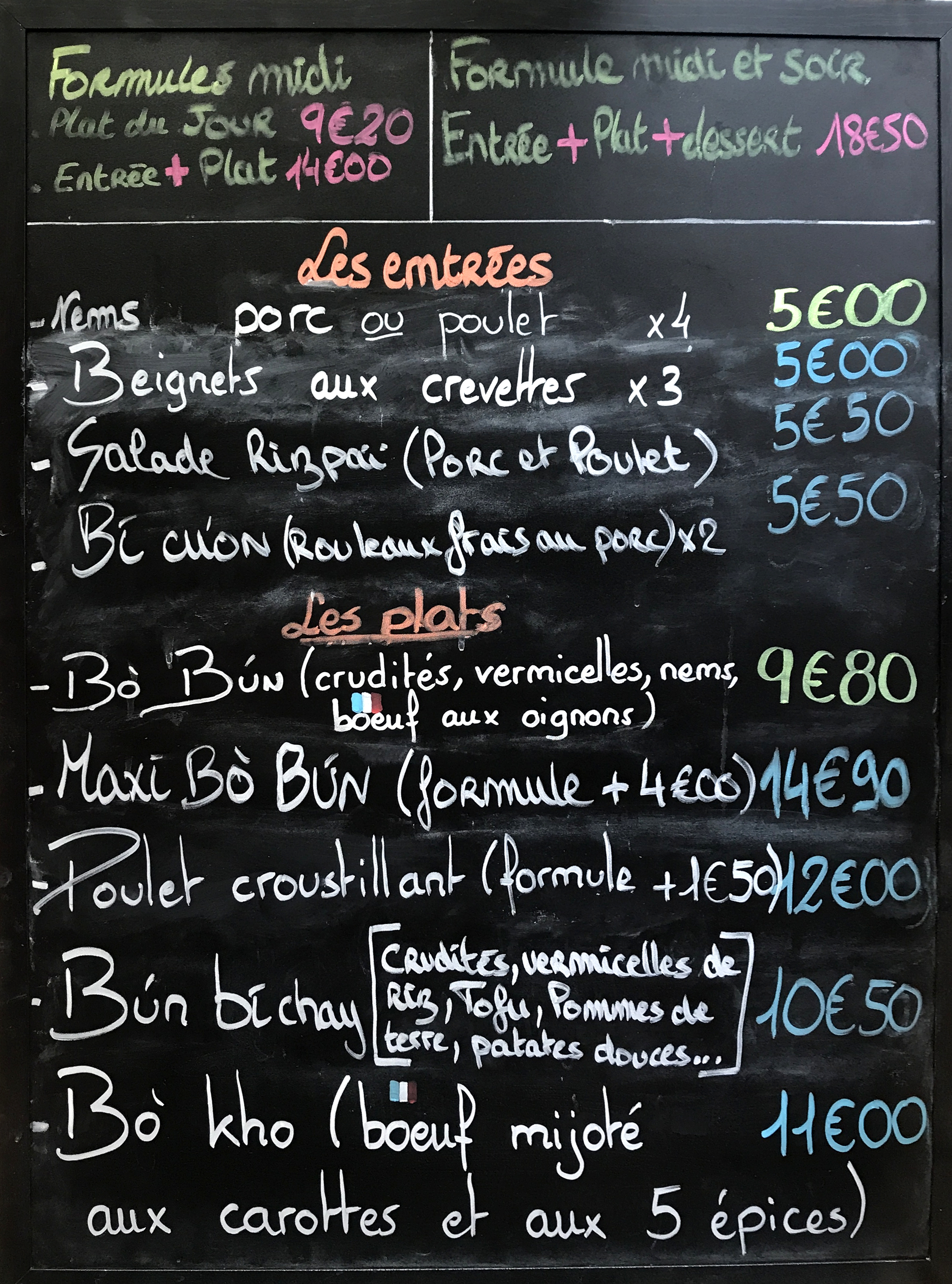
A chalkboard menu at a restaurant in Lyon, France, allowing the prices and dishes to be easily changed

Dynamic pricing, also referred to as surge pricing, demand pricing, time-based pricing and variable pricing, is a revenue management pricing strategy in which businesses set flexible prices for products or services based on current market demands. It usually entails raising prices during periods of peak demand and lowering prices during periods of low demand.

As a pricing strategy, it encourages consumers to make purchases during periods of low demand (such as buying tickets well in advance of an event or buying meals outside of lunch and dinner rushes) and disincentivizes them during periods of high demand (such as using less electricity during peak electricity hours). In some sectors, economists have characterized dynamic pricing as improving welfare relative to uniform pricing and contributing to the more efficient allocation of limited resources. Its usage often stirs public controversy, as people frequently think of it as price gouging.

Businesses are able to change prices based on algorithms that take into account competitor pricing, supply and demand, and other external factors in the market. Dynamic pricing is a common practice in several industries such as hospitality, tourism, entertainment, retail, electricity, and public transport. Each industry takes a slightly different approach to dynamic pricing based on its individual needs and the demand for the product.

== Methods ==
=== Cost-plus pricing ===
Cost-plus pricing is the most basic method of pricing. A store will simply charge consumers the cost required to produce a product plus a predetermined amount of profit. Cost-plus pricing is simple to execute, but it only considers internal information when setting the price and does not factor in external influencers like market reactions, the weather, or changes in consumer value. A dynamic pricing tool can make it easier to update prices, but will not make the updates often if the user does not account for external information like competitor market prices. Due to its simplicity, this is the most widely used method of pricing with around 74% of companies in the United States employing this dynamic pricing strategy. Although widely used, the usage is skewed, with companies facing a high degree of competition using this strategy the most, on the other hand, companies that deal with manufacturing tend to use this strategy the least.

=== Pricing based on competitors ===
Businesses that want to price competitively will monitor their competitors' prices and adjust accordingly. This is called competitor-based pricing. In retail, the competitor that many companies watch is Amazon, which changes prices frequently throughout the day. Amazon is a market leader in retail that changes prices often, which encourages other retailers to alter their prices to stay competitive. Such online retailers use price-matching mechanisms like price trackers. The retailers give the end-user an option for the same, and upon selecting the option to price match, an online bot searches for the lowest price across various websites and offers a price lower than the lowest.

Such pricing behavior depends on market conditions, as well as a firm's planning. Although a firm existing within a highly competitive market is compelled to cut prices, that is not always the case. In case of high competition, yet a stable market, and a long-term view, it was predicted that firms will tend to cooperate on a price basis rather than undercut each other.

=== Pricing based on value or elasticity ===
Ideally, companies should ask the price for a product that is equal to the value a consumer attaches to a product. This is called value-based pricing. As this value can differ from person to person, it is difficult to uncover the perfect value and have a differentiated price for every person. However, consumers' willingness to pay can be used as a proxy for the perceived value. Products with high elasticities are highly sensitive to changes in price, while products with low elasticities are less sensitive to price changes (ceteris paribus). Subsequently, products with low elasticity are typically valued more by consumers if everything else is equal. With the price elasticity of products, companies can calculate how many consumers are willing to pay for the product at each price point. The dynamic aspect of this pricing method is that elasticities change with respect to the product, category, time, location, and retailers. With the price elasticity of products and the margin of the product, retailers can use this method with their pricing strategy to aim for volume, revenue, or profit maximization strategies.

=== Bundle pricing ===
There are two types of bundle pricing strategies: one from the consumer's point of view, and one from the seller's point of view. From the seller's point of view, an end product's price depends on whether it is bundled with something else; which bundle it belongs to; and sometimes on which customers it is offered to. This strategy is adopted by print-media houses and other subscription-based services. The Wall Street Journal, for example, offers a standalone price if an electronic mode of delivery is purchased, and a discount when it is bundled with print delivery.

=== Time-based ===
Many industries, especially online retailers, change prices depending on the time of day. Most retail customers shop during weekly office hours (between 9 am and 5 pm), so many retailers will raise prices during the morning and afternoon, then lower prices during the evening.

Time-based pricing of services such as provision of electric power includes:

- Time-of-use pricing (TOU pricing), whereby electricity prices are set for a specific time period on an advance or forward basis, typically not changing more often than twice a year. Prices paid for energy consumed during these periods are pre-established and known to consumers in advance, allowing them to vary their usage in response to such prices and manage their energy costs by shifting usage to a lower-cost period, or reducing their consumption overall (demand response)
- Critical peak pricing, whereby time-of-use prices are in effect except for certain peak days, when prices may reflect the costs of generating and/or purchasing electricity at the wholesale level.
- Real-time pricing, whereby electricity prices may change as often as hourly (exceptionally more often). Prices may be signaled to a user on an advanced or forward basis, reflecting the utility's cost of generating and/or purchasing electricity at the wholesale level; and
- Peak-load reduction credits, for consumers with large loads who enter into pre-established peak-load-reduction agreements that reduce a utility's planned capacity obligations.

Peak fit pricing is best used for products that are inelastic in supply, where suppliers are fully able to anticipate demand growth and thus be able to charge differently for service during systematic periods of time.

A utility with regulated prices may develop a time-based pricing schedule on analysis of its long-run costs, such as operation and investment costs. A utility such as electricity (or another service), operating in a market environment, may be auctioned on a competitive market; time-based pricing will typically reflect price variations on the market. Such variations include both regular oscillations due to the demand patterns of users; supply issues (such as availability of intermittent natural resources like water flow or wind); and exceptional price peaks. Price peaks reflect strained conditions in the market (possibly augmented by market manipulation, as during the California electricity crisis), and convey a possible lack of investment. Extreme events include the default by Griddy after the 2021 Texas power crisis.

== Algorithmic pricing ==
Algorithmic pricing is the practice of automatically setting the requested price for items for sale, in order to maximize the seller's profits. Dynamic pricing algorithms usually rely on one or more of the following data.

- Probabilistic and statistical information on potential buyers; see Bayesian-optimal pricing.
- Prices of competitors. E.g., a seller of an item may automatically detect the lowest price currently offered for that item, and suggest a price within $1 of that price. Automated technology applications for pricing differ among competitors which makes price discovery highly complex and dynamic in the general retail marketplace. Retailers and technology vendors claim the adoption of new pricing tools continues to be dependent on their consumer's price sensitivity and trust that it will not be working against them.
- Personal information of the currently active buyer, such as her or his demographics and her or his interest in the product. If the seller detects that you are about to buy, your price goes up.
- Business information of the seller, such as the expected date in which he or she is going to receive new stocks, or her or his target selling velocity in units per day.

== By industry ==
=== Hospitality ===
Time-based pricing is the standard method of pricing in the tourism industry. Higher prices are charged during the peak season, or during special event periods. In the off-season, hotels may charge only the operating costs of the establishment, whereas investments and any profit are gained during the high season (this is the basic principle of long-run marginal cost pricing: see also long run and short run).

Hotels and other players in the hospitality industry use dynamic pricing to adjust the cost of rooms and packages based on the supply and demand needs at a particular moment. The goal of dynamic pricing in this industry is to find the highest price that consumers are willing to pay. Another name for dynamic pricing in the industry is demand pricing. This form of price discrimination is used to try to maximize revenue based on the willingness to pay of different market segments. It features price increases when demand is high and decreases to stimulate demand when it is low. Having a variety of prices based on the demand at each point in the day makes it possible for hotels to generate more revenue by bringing in customers at the different price points they are willing to pay.

=== Transportation ===
Airlines change prices often depending on the day of the week, time of day, and the number of days before the flight. For airlines, dynamic pricing factors in different components such as: how many seats a flight has, departure time, and average cancellations on similar flights. A 2022 study in Econometrica estimated that dynamic pricing was beneficial for "early-arriving, leisure consumers at the expense of late-arriving, business travelers. Although dynamic pricing ensures seat availability for business travelers, these consumers are then charged higher prices. When aggregated over markets, welfare is higher under dynamic pricing than under uniform pricing."

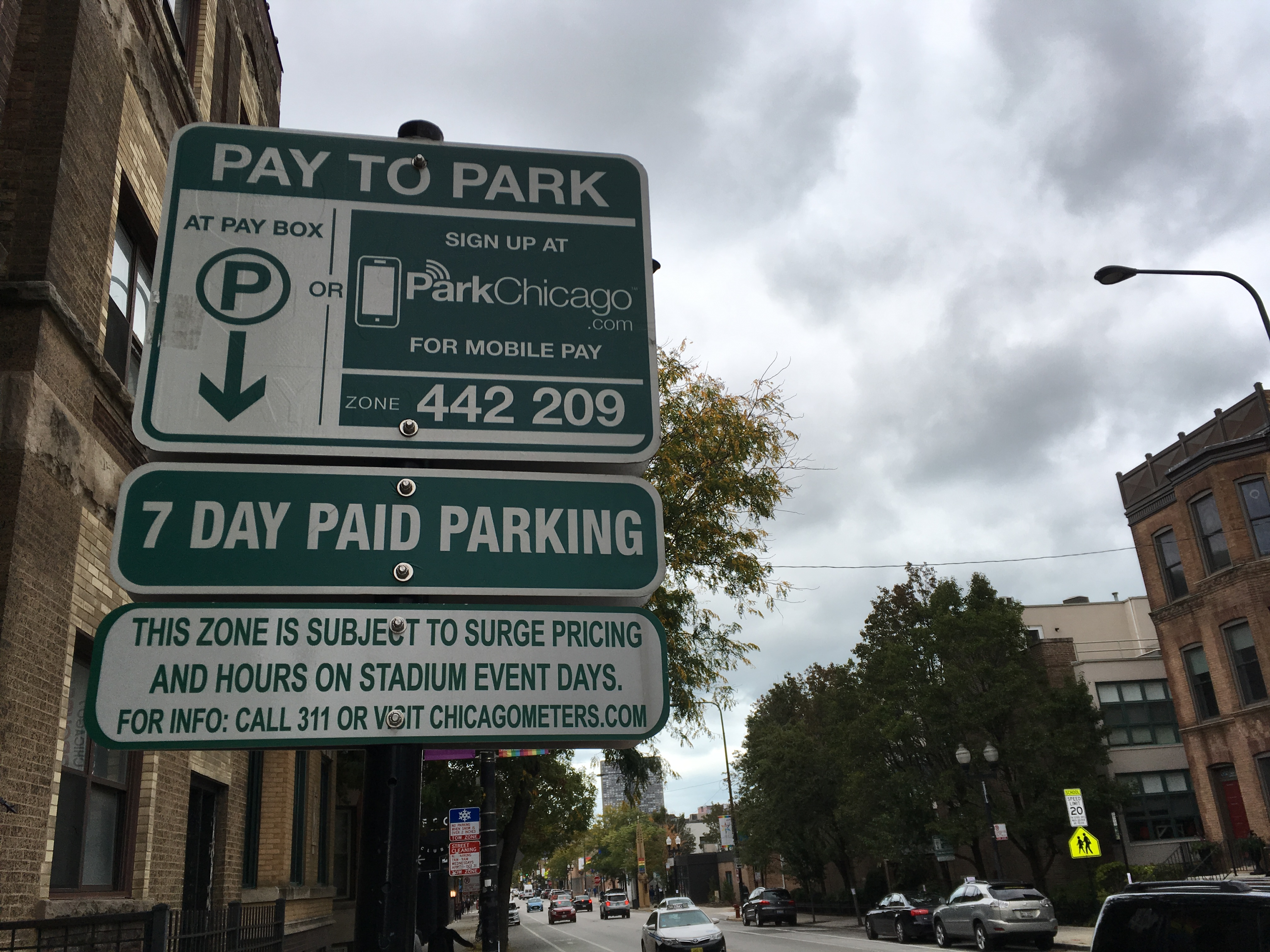
Sign in Chicago marking a parking zone as being "subject to surge pricing and hours on stadium event days"

Congestion pricing is often used in public transportation and road pricing, where a higher price at peak periods is used to encourage more efficient use of the service or time-shifting to cheaper or free off-peak travel. For example, the San Francisco Bay Bridge charges a higher toll during rush hour and on the weekend, when drivers are more likely to be traveling. This is an effective way to boost revenue when demand is high, while also managing demand since drivers unwilling to pay the premium will avoid those times. The London congestion charge discourages automobile travel to Central London during peak periods. The Washington Metro and Long Island Rail Road charge higher fares at peak times. The tolls on the Custis Memorial Parkway vary automatically according to the actual number of cars on the roadway, and at times of severe congestion can reach almost $50.

Dynamic pricing is also used by Uber and Lyft. Uber's system for "dynamically adjusting prices for service" measures supply (Uber drivers) and demand (passengers hailing rides by use of smartphones), and prices fares accordingly. Ride-sharing companies such as Uber and Lyft have increasingly incorporated dynamic pricing into their operations. This strategy enables these businesses to offer the best prices for both drivers and passengers by adjusting prices in real-time in response to supply and demand. When there is a strong demand for rides, rates go up to encourage more drivers to offer their services, and when there is a low demand, prices go down to draw in more passengers.

=== Professional sports ===
Some professional sports teams use dynamic pricing structures to boost revenue. In the United States, dynamic pricing is particularly important in baseball because Major League Baseball (MLB) teams play around twice as many games as some other sports and in much larger venues.

Sports that are outdoors have to factor weather into pricing strategy, in addition to the date of the game, date of purchase, and opponent. Tickets for a game during inclement weather will sell better at a lower price; conversely, when a team is on a winning streak, fans will be willing to pay more.

Dynamic pricing was first introduced to sports by a start-up software company Qcue. MLB club San Francisco Giants implemented a pilot of 2,000 seats in the View Reserved and Bleachers and moved on to dynamically pricing the entire venue for the 2010 season. Qcue currently works with two-thirds of MLB franchises, not all of which have implemented a full dynamic pricing structure. In 2012, the Giants, Oakland Athletics, and St. Louis Cardinals became the first teams to dynamically price postseason tickets. While behind baseball in terms of adoption, the National Basketball Association, National Hockey League, and NCAA have also seen teams implement dynamic pricing. Outside of the US, it has since been adopted on a trial basis by some clubs in the Football League. Scottish Premier League club Heart of Midlothian introduced dynamic pricing for the sale of their season tickets in 2012, but supporters complained that they were being charged significantly more than the advertised price.

=== Retail ===
Retailers, and online retailers, in particular, adjust the price of their products according to competitors, time, traffic, conversion rates, and sales goals.

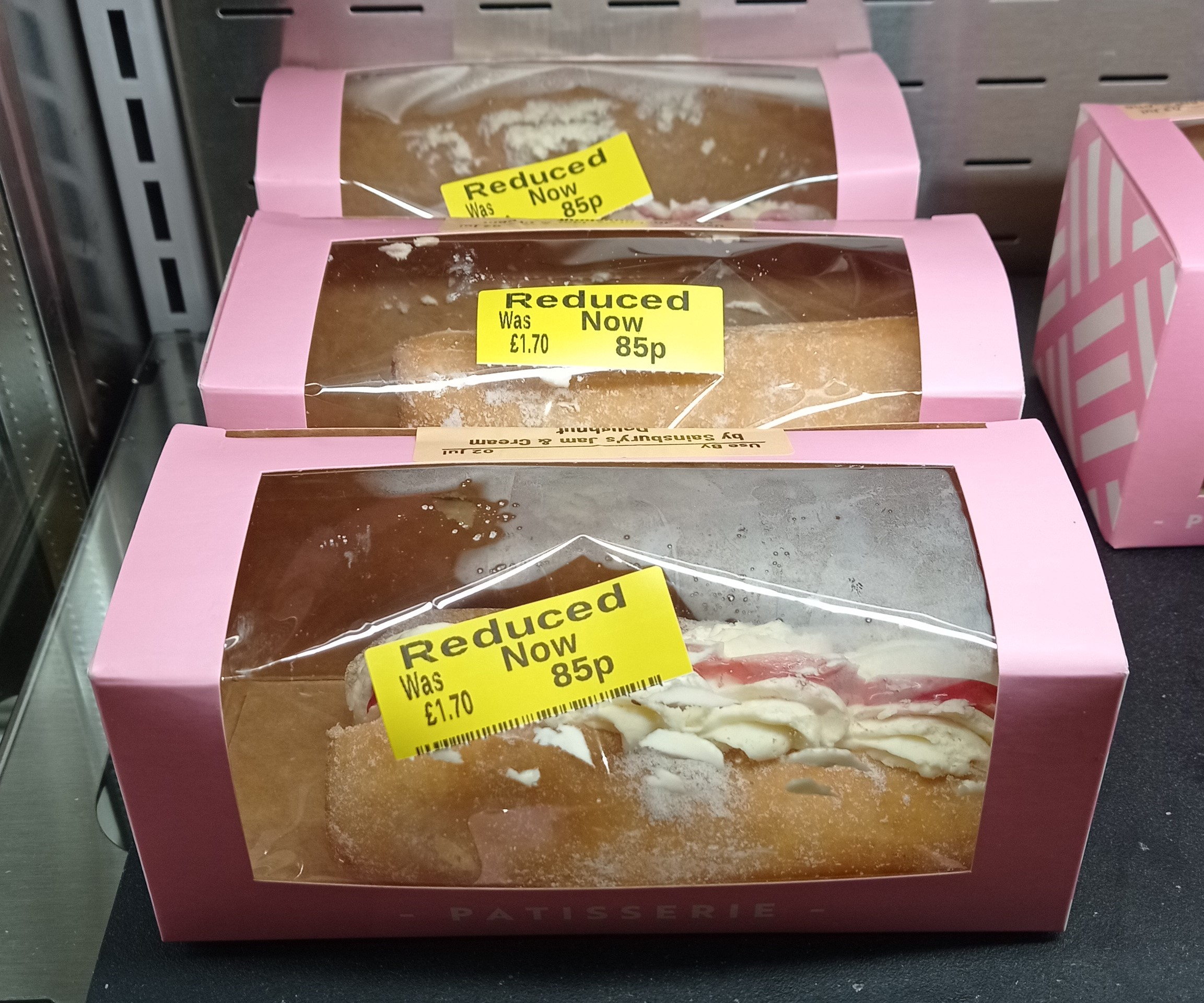
Discounted cakes in a supermarket

Supermarkets often use dynamic pricing strategies to manage perishable inventory, such as fresh produce and meat products, that have a limited shelf life. By adjusting prices based on factors like expiration dates and current inventory levels, retailers can minimize waste and maximize revenue. Additionally, the widespread adoption of electronic shelf labels in grocery stores has made it easier to implement dynamic pricing strategies in real-time, enabling retailers to respond quickly to changing market conditions and consumer preferences. These labels also make it easier for grocery stores to mark up high demand items (e.g. making it more expensive to purchase ice in warmer weather).

=== Theme parks ===
Theme parks have also recently adopted this pricing model. Disneyland and Disney World adapted this practice in 2016, and Universal Studios followed suit. Since the supply of parks is limited and new rides cannot be added based on the surge of demand, the model followed by theme parks in regards to dynamic pricing resembles that followed by the hotel industry. During summertime, when demand is rather inelastic, the parks charge higher prices, whereas ticket prices in winter are less expensive.

== Criticism ==
Dynamic pricing is often criticized as price gouging. Dynamic pricing is widely unpopular among consumers as some feel it tends to favour particular buyers. While the intent of surge pricing is generally driven by demand-supply dynamics, some instances have proven otherwise. Some businesses utilise modern technologies (Big data and IoT) to adopt dynamic pricing strategies, where collection and analysis of real-time private data occur almost instantaneously.

As modern technology on data analysis is developing rapidly, enabling to detect one's browsing history, age, gender, location and preference, some consumers fear "unwanted privacy invasions and data fraud" as the extent of their information being used is often undisclosed or ambiguous. Even with firms' disclaimers stating private information will only be used strictly for data collection and promising no third-party distribution will occur, cases of misconducting companies can disrupt consumers' perceptions. Some consumers were simply skeptical on general information collection outright due to the potentiality of "data leakages and misuses", possibly impacting suppliers' long-term profitability stimulated by reduced customer loyalty.

Consumers can also develop price fairness/unfairness perceptions, whereby different prices being offered to individuals for the same products can affect customers' perceptions on price fairness. Studies discovered easiness of learning other individuals' purchase price induced consumers to sense price unfairness and lower satisfaction when others paid less than themselves. However, when consumers were price-advantaged, development of trust and increased repurchase intentions were observed. Other research indicated price fairness perceptions varied depending on their privacy sensitivity and natures of dynamic pricing like, individual pricing, segment pricing, location data pricing and purchase history pricing.

=== Amazon ===
Amazon engaged in price discrimination for some customers in the year 2000, showing different prices at the same time for the same item to different customers, potentially violating the Robinson–Patman Act. When this incident was criticized, Amazon issued a public apology with refunds to almost 7,000 customers but did not cease the practice.

During the COVID-19 pandemic, prices of certain items in high demand were reported to shoot up by quadruple their original price, garnering negative attention. Although Amazon denied claims of any such manipulation and blamed a few sellers for shooting up prices for essentials such as sanitizers and masks, prices of essential products 'sold by Amazon' had also seen a hefty rise in prices. Amazon claimed this was a result of software malfunction.

=== Uber ===
Uber's surge pricing has also been criticized. In 2013, when New York was in the midst of a storm, Uber users saw fares go up eight times the usual fares. This incident attracted public backlash from public figures, with Salman Rushdie amongst others publicly criticizing this move.

After this incident, the company started placing caps on how high surge pricing can go during times of emergency, starting in 2015. Drivers have been known to hold off on accepting rides in an area until surge pricing forces fares up to a level satisfactory to them.

=== Wendy's ===
In 2024, Wendy's announced plans to test dynamic pricing in certain American locations during 2025. This pricing method was included with plans to redesign menu boards and these changes were announced to stakeholders. The company received significant online backlash for this decision. In response, Wendy's stated that the intended implementation was limited to reducing prices during low traffic periods.

=== Live music and sport ===
The use of dynamic, algorithmic and demand-based pricing in the live music sector has been the subject of considerable controversy. Ticketmaster introduced dynamic pricing in 2022, and applied it to sale of tickets for tours of Blink-182 (where tickets were priced as high as $600) and Bruce Springsteen (where prices reached $4,000–$5,000).

In the United Kingdom and Ireland, there was considerable controversy in 2024 over allegations of dynamic pricing by Ticketmaster for the Oasis Live '25 Tour. Fans made complaints to the Advertising Standards Authority. Giving evidence to the House of Commons Business and Trade Select Committee, Ticketmaster UK denied they were engaging in dynamic pricing, claiming instead that tickets were offered at "differing price tiers", and pricing was determined by event organisers. The UK's Competition and Markets Authority launched an investigation into ticket pricing for the Oasis tour, which concluded that Ticketmaster "may have misled Oasis fans" about the price of the tickets. The European Commission also announced they were to investigate the use of dynamic pricing for concert tickets. Due to the public backlash over pricing in the UK and Ireland, Oasis announced they would not use dynamic pricing for later legs in the world tour including North America and Australia.

A number of bands and artists have publicly announced that they are not going to use dynamic ticket pricing including Coldplay, Taylor Swift, Ed Sheeran, Iron Maiden, and Robert Smith from The Cure. After their 2020 tour of New Zealand, Crowded House stated they "had no prior knowledge" of dynamic pricing, that they "did not approve" and asked Live Nation to refund the difference in price.

In May 2025, The Athletic reported that FIFA will use dynamic pricing for tickets to the men's 2026 FIFA World Cup, as well as the 2025 FIFA Club World Cup. It was also used for the 2024 Copa América.

== Regulation ==
=== European Union ===
The European Union's Directive 2019/2161 stipulates that businesses should disclose when prices they provide are "personalised on the basis of automated decision-making." The directive permits dynamic pricing changes "in response to market demands when those techniques do not involve personalisation based on automated decision-making."

=== United States ===
In November, 2025, New York state's "Algorithmic Pricing Disclosure Act" came into effect. The law requires companies to disclose when prices are set using a consumer's personal data. The bill enables civil penalties of up to $1,000 per violation.

In April 2026, Maryland Governor Wes Moore signed HB0895 into law, which bans grocery stores and third-party grocery delivery services from using consumer personal data to raise prices for consumers. The law authorizes $10,000 penalties for first-time violations and $25,000 for repeat offenses. The law is scheduled to take effect in October 2026.

== See also ==
- Algorithmic trading
- Contribution margin
- Demand shaping
- Hedonic regression
- Pay what you want
- Price optimization software
- Pricing
- Surveillance pricing
- Tacit collusion
- Yield management
