= Asymmetric competition =

Asymmetric competition is a form of business competition in which firms compete in some markets or contexts but not in others. In such cases, a firm may choose to allocate competitive resources and marketing actions among its competitors out of proportion to their market share. It can be visualized using techniques such as multidimensional scaling and perceptual mapping.

== Forms ==
- Firm A competes with B in some markets, but not others.
- Firm A competes with B over certain attributes (such as reliability engineering and design) but not over others (price).
- Firm A considers B a competitor, but B does not consider A a competitor.
- Firm A does not consider B a competitor, but consumers see A's products as competing with B's products.

== See also ==
- Coopetition
- Product differentiation
- Non-price competition
- Information asymmetry
- Multimarket contact
- Size-asymmetric competition
- Outline of organizational theory
