= Collusion =

Cooperation between firms to limit competition

Collusion is a deceitful agreement or secret cooperation between two or more parties to limit open competition by deceiving, misleading or defrauding others of their legal right. Collusion is not always considered illegal. It can be used to attain objectives forbidden by law; for example, by defrauding or gaining an unfair market advantage. It is an agreement among firms or individuals to divide a market, set prices, limit production or limit opportunities. It can involve "price or wage fixing, kickbacks, or misrepresenting the independence of the relationship between the colluding parties". In legal terms, all acts effected by collusion are considered void.

== Definition ==
In the study of economics and market competition, collusion takes place within an industry when rival companies cooperate for their mutual benefit. Conspiracy usually involves an agreement between two or more sellers to take action to suppress competition between sellers in the market. Because competition among sellers can provide consumers with low prices, conspiracy agreements increase the price consumers pay for the goods. Because of this harm to consumers, it is against antitrust laws to fix prices by agreement between producers, so participants must keep it a secret. Collusion often takes place within an oligopoly market structure, where there are few firms and agreements that have significant impacts on the entire market or industry. To differentiate from a cartel, collusive agreements between parties may not be explicit; however, the implications of cartels and collusion are the same.

Under competition law, there is an important distinction between direct and covert collusion. Direct collusion generally refers to a group of companies communicating directly with each other to coordinate and monitor their actions, such as cooperating through pricing, market allocation, sales quotas, etc. On the other hand, tacit collusion is where companies coordinate and monitor their behavior without direct communication. This type of collusion is generally not considered illegal, so companies guilty of tacit conspiracy should face no penalties even though their actions would have a similar economic impact as explicit conspiracy.

Collusion results from less competition through mutual understanding, where competitors can independently set prices and market share. A core principle of antitrust policy is that companies must not communicate with each other. Even if conversations between multiple companies are illegal but not enforceable, the incentives to comply with collusive agreements are the same with and without communication. It is against competition law for companies to have explicit conversations in private. If evidence of conversations is accidentally left behind, it will become the most critical and conclusive evidence in antitrust litigation. Even without communication, businesses can coordinate prices by observation, but from a legal standpoint, this tacit handling leaves no evidence. Most companies cooperate through invisible collusion, so whether companies communicate is at the core of antitrust policy.

Collusion is illegal in the United States, Canada, Australia and most of the EU due to antitrust laws, but implicit collusion in the form of price leadership and tacit understandings still takes place.

=== Tacit collusion ===
Covert collusion is known as tacit collusion and is considered legal. Adam Smith in The Wealth of Nations explains that since the masters (business owners) are fewer in number, it is easier to collude to serve common interests among those involved, such as maintaining low wages, whilst it is difficult for the labour to coordinate to protect their interests due to their vast numbers. Hence, business owners have a larger advantage over the working class. Nevertheless, according to Adam Smith, the public rarely hears about coordination and collaborations that occur between business owners, as it takes place in informal settings. Some forms of explicit collusion are not considered impactful enough on an individual basis to be considered illegal, such as that which occurred by the social media group WallStreetBets in the GameStop short squeeze. There are many ways that implicit collusion tends to develop:

- The practice of stock analyst conference calls and meetings of industry participants almost necessarily results in tremendous amounts of strategic and price transparency. This allows each firm to see how and why every other firm is pricing their products.
- If the practice of the industry causes more complicated pricing which is difficult for the consumer to understand (such as risk-based pricing, hidden taxes and fees, negotiable pricing), this can cause competition based on price to be meaningless (because it would be too complicated to explain to the customer in a short advertisement). This causes industries to have essentially the same prices and compete on advertising and image, something theoretically as damaging to consumers as normal price fixing.

== Base model of (price) collusion ==
For a cartel to work successfully, it must:

- Co-ordinate on the conspiracy agreement (bargaining, explicit or implicit communication)
- Monitor compliance
- Punish non-compliance
- Control the expansion of non-cartel supply
- Avoid inspection by customers and competition authorities

Regarding stability within the cartel:

- Collusion on high prices means that members have an incentive to deviate
- In a one-off situation, high prices are not sustainable
- Requires long-term vision and repeated interactions
- Companies need to choose between two approaches：
1. Insist on collusion agreements (now) and promote cooperation (future)
2. Turn away from the alliance (now) and face punishment (future)
- Two factors influence this choice: (1) deviations must be detectable (2) penalties for deviations must have a significant effect
- Collusion is illegal, contracts between cartels establishing collusion are not protected by law, cannot be enforced by courts, and must have other forms of punishment

== Variations ==
- $\frac{\pi (P_c)}{n(1-\delta)}\geq\pi(P_c)\rightarrow\frac{1}{n(1-\delta)}\geq 1$
- $1 \geq n(1-\delta)$
- $1 \geq n-n\delta$
- $n \delta \geq n-1$
- $\delta \geq \frac{n-1}{n}$

Suppose this market has $n$ firms. At the collusive price, the firms are symmetric, so they divide the profits equally between the whole industry, represented as $\frac{\pi(P_c)}{n}$. If and only if the profit of choosing to deviate is greater than that of sticking to collude, i.e.

- $\frac{\pi (P_c)}{n(1-\delta)}\geq\pi(P_c)$ (Companies have no incentive to deviate unilaterally)
- Therefore, the cartel alliance will be stable when $\delta\geq \frac{n-1}{n}$ is the case, i.e. the firm has no incentive to deviate unilaterally. So as the number of firms increases, the more difficult it is for The Cartel to maintain stability.

As the number of firms in the market increases, so does the factor of the minimum discount required for collusion to succeed.

According to neoclassical price-determination theory and game theory, the independence of suppliers forces prices to their minimum, increasing efficiency and decreasing the price-determining ability of each firm. However, if all firms collude to increase prices, loss of sales will be minimized, as consumers lack choices at lower prices and must decide between what is available. This benefits the colluding firms, as they generate more sales at the cost of efficiency to society. However, depending on the assumptions made in the theoretical model on the information available to all firms, there are some outcomes, based on Cooperative Game Theory, where collusion may have higher efficiency than if firms did not collude.

One variation of this traditional theory is the theory of kinked demand. Firms face a kinked demand curve if, when one firm decreases its price, other firms are expected to follow suit to maintain sales. When one firm increases its price, its rivals are unlikely to follow, as they would lose the sales gains they would otherwise receive by holding prices at the previous level. Kinked demand potentially fosters supra-competitive prices because any one firm would receive a reduced benefit from cutting price, as opposed to the benefits accruing under neoclassical theory and certain game-theoretic models such as Bertrand competition.

Collusion may also occur in auction markets and in procurement when independent bidders coordinate their bids (bid rigging).

== Deviation ==
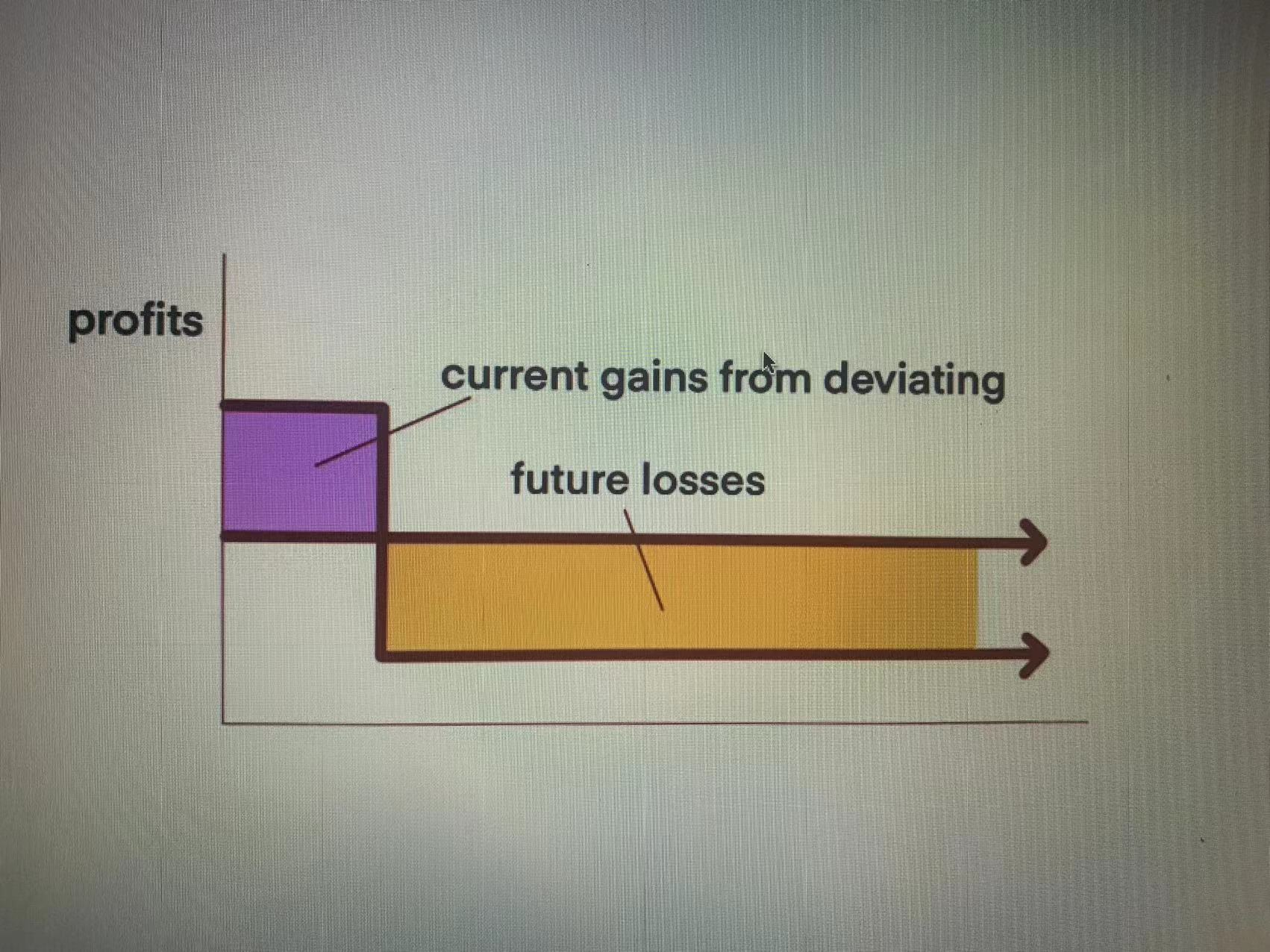
Future collusive profits

Actions that generate sufficient returns in the future are important to every company, and the probability of continued interaction and the company discount factor must be high enough. The sustainability of cooperation between companies also depends on the threat of punishment, which is also a matter of credibility. Firms that deviate from cooperative pricing will use MMC in each market. MMC increases the loss of deviation, and incremental loss is more important than incremental gain when the firm's objective function is concave. Therefore, the purpose of MMC is to strengthen corporate compliance or inhibit deviant collusion.

The principle of collusion: firms give up deviation gains in the short term in exchange for continued collusion in the future.

- Collusion occurs when companies place more emphasis on future profits
- Collusion is easier to sustain when the choice deviates from the maximum profit to be gained is lower (i.e. the penalty profit is lower) and the penalty is greater.
- Future collusive profits − future punishment profits ≥ current deviation profits − current collusive profits-collusion can sustain.

Scholars in economics and management have tried to identify factors explaining why some firms are more or less likely to be involved in collusion. Some have noted the role of the regulatory environment and the existence of leniency programs.

== Indicators ==
Some actions that may indicate collusion among competitors are:

- Charging uniform prices or setting prices that are either too high or too low without justification
- Paying or receiving kickbacks and agreeing to refer customers only to each other
- Dividing territories and horizontal territorial allocation of markets among themselves
- Tying agreements and anticompetitive Product bundling (although, not all product bundling is anticompetitive)
- Refusal to deal with certain customers or suppliers and exclusive dealing with certain customers or suppliers
- Selling products below cost in order to drive out competitors (also known as dumping)
- Restricting the distribution or supply of products along the supply chain through vertical restraints
- Bid rigging by fixing bids or agreeing not to bid for certain contracts

== Examples ==
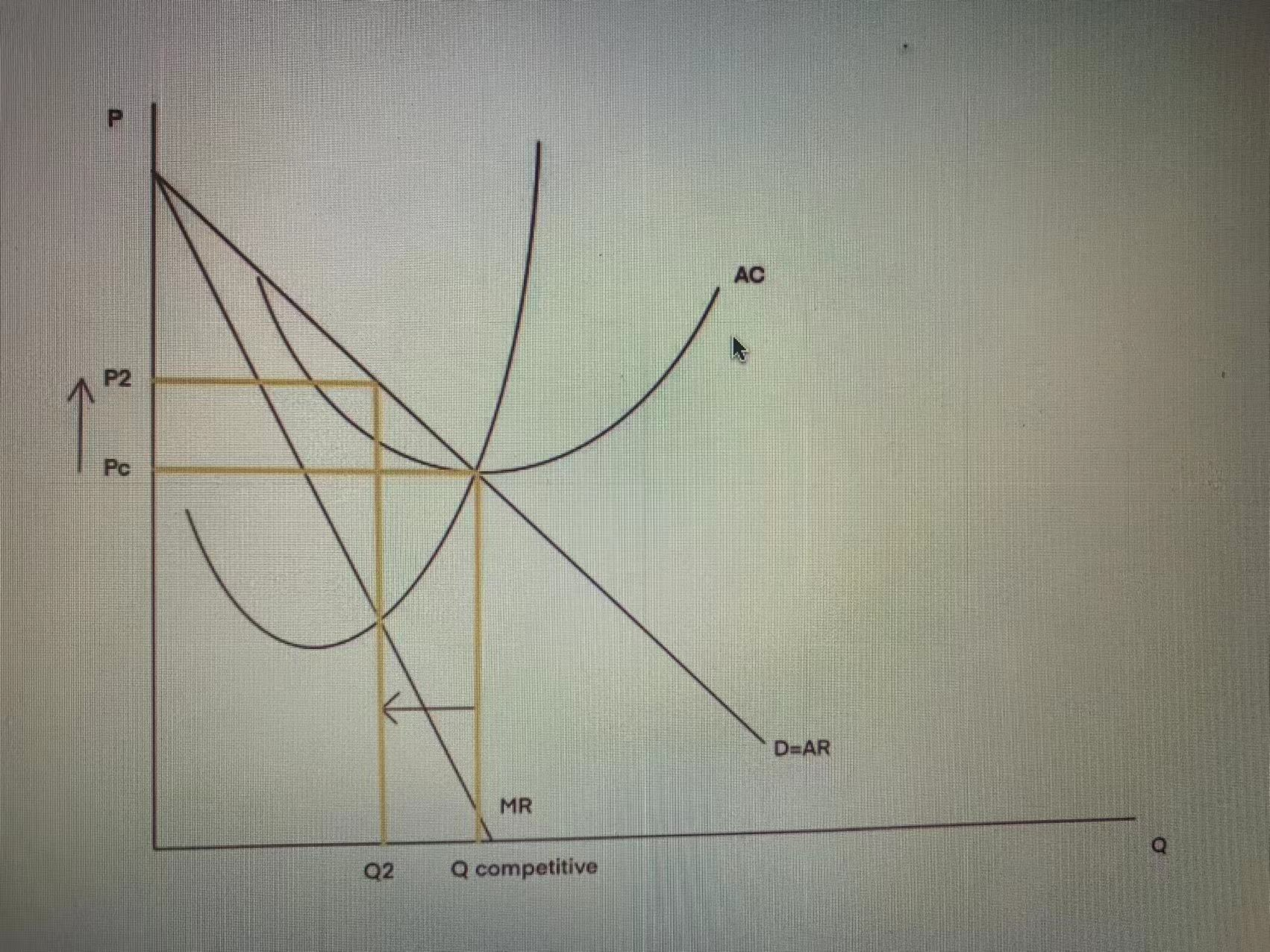
Set higher prices

- In the example in the picture, the dots in Pc and Q represent competitive industry prices. If firms collude, they can limit production to Q2 and raise the price to P2. Collusion usually involves some form of agreement to seek a higher price.
- When companies discriminate, price collusion is less likely, so the discount factor needed to ensure stability must be increased. In such price competition, competitors use delivered pricing to discriminate in space, but this does not mean that firms using delivered pricing to discriminate cannot collude.

=== United States ===
- Market division and price-fixing among manufacturers of heavy electrical equipment in the 1960s, including General Electric.
- An attempt by Major League Baseball owners to restrict players' salaries in the mid-1980s.
- The sharing of potential contract terms by NBA free agents in an effort to help a targeted franchise circumvent the salary cap.
- Price fixing within food manufacturers providing cafeteria food to schools and the military in 1993.
- Market division and output determination of the livestock feed additive lysine, by companies in the US, Japan and South Korea in 1996, Archer Daniels Midland being the most notable of these.
- Chip dumping in poker or any other card game played for money.
- Ben & Jerry's and Häagen-Dazs collusion of products in 2013: Ben and Jerry's makes chunkier flavors with more treats in them, while Häagen-Dazs sticks to smoother flavors.
- Google and Apple against employee poaching, a collusion case in 2015 wherein it was revealed that both companies agreed not to hire employees from one another in order to halt the rise in wages.
- Google has been hit with a series of antitrust lawsuits. In October 2020, the US Department of Justice filed a lawsuit alleging that Google unlawfully boxed out competitors by reaching deals with phone makers, including Apple and Samsung, to be the default search engine on their devices. Another lawsuit filed by nearly 40 attorneys general in December 2020 alleges that Google's search results favored its own services over those of more-specialized rivals, a tactic that harmed competitors.

=== Europe ===
- The illegal collusion between German automakers BMW, Daimler and Volkswagen, discovered by the European Commission in 2019, to hinder technological progress in improving the quality of vehicle emissions in order to reduce the cost of production and maximize profits.

=== Australia ===
- Japanese shipping company Kawasaki Kisen Kaisha Ltd (K-Line) were fined $34.5 million by the Federal Court for engaging in criminal cartel conduct. The court found that K-Line participated in a cartel with other shipping companies to fix prices on the transportation of cars, trucks, and buses to Australia between 2009 and 2012. K-Line pleaded guilty in April 2018 and the fine is the largest ever imposed under the Competition and Consumer Act. The court noted that the penalty should serve as a strong warning to businesses that cartel conduct will not be tolerated and will result in serious consequences.
- Between 2004 and 2013, Dr Esra Ogru, the former CEO of an Australian biotech company called Phosphagenics, colluded with two colleagues by using false invoicing and credit card reimbursements to defraud her employer of more than $6.1 million.

== Barriers ==
There can be significant barriers to collusion. In any given industry, these may include:

- The number of firms: As the number of firms in an industry increases, it is more difficult to successfully organize, collude and communicate.
- Cost and demand differences between firms: If costs vary significantly between firms, it may be impossible to establish a price at which to fix output. Firms generally prefer to produce at a level where marginal cost meets marginal revenue, if one firm can produce at a lower cost, it will prefer to produce more units, and would receive a larger share of profits than its partner in the agreement.
- Asymmetry of information: Colluding firms may not have all the correct information about all other firms, from a quantitative perspective (firms may not know all other firms' cost and demand conditions) or a qualitative perspective (moral hazard). In either situation, firms may not know each other's preferences or actions, and any discrepancy would incentive at least one actor to renege.
- Cheating: There is considerable incentive to cheat on collusion agreements; although lowering prices might trigger price wars, in the short term the defecting firm may gain considerably. This phenomenon is frequently referred to as "chiseling".
- Potential entry: New firms may enter the industry, establishing a new baseline price and eliminating collusion (though anti-dumping laws and tariffs can prevent foreign companies from entering the market).
- Economic recession: An increase in average total cost or a decrease in revenue provides the incentive to compete with rival firms in order to secure a larger market share and increased demand.
- Anti-collusion legal framework and collusive lawsuit. Many countries with anti-collusion laws outlaw side-payments, which are an indication of collusion as firms pay each other to incentivize the continuation of the collusive relationship, may see less collusion as firms will likely prefer situations where profits are distributed towards themselves rather than the combined venture.
- Leniency Programs: Leniency programs are policies that reduce sanctions against collusion if a participant voluntarily confesses their behavior or cooperates with the public authority's investigation. One example of a leniency program is offering immunity to the first firm who comes clean and gives the government information about collusion. These programs are designed to destabilize collusion and increase deterrence by encouraging firms to report illegal behavior.

== Conditions conducive to collusion ==
There are several industry traits that are thought to be conducive to collusion or empirically associated with collusion. These traits include:

- High market concentration: High market concentration refers to a market with few firms, which makes it easier for these firms to collude and coordinate their actions.
- Homogeneous products: Homogeneous products refer to products that are similar in nature, which makes it easier for firms to agree on prices and reduces the incentive for firms to compete on product differentiation
- Stable demand and/or excess capacity: Stable demand and capacity implies predictability and therefore demand and capacity does not fluctuate significantly, which makes it easier for firms to coordinate their actions and maintain a collusive agreement. This can also refer to a situation where firms have more production capacity than is needed to meet demand.

== Government intervention ==
Collusion often occurs within an oligopoly market structure, which is a type of market failure. Therefore, natural market forces alone may be insufficient to prevent or deter collusion, and government intervention is often necessary.

Fortunately, various forms of government intervention can be taken to reduce collusion among firms and promote natural market competition.

- Fines and imprisonment to companies that collude and their executives who are personally liable.
- Detect collusion by screening markets for suspicious pricing activity and high profitability.
- Provide immunity (leniency) to the first company to confess and provide the government with information about the collusion.

== See also ==
- Conscious parallelism
- Corporate crime
- Competition law
