= Peter Anthony Lawrence =

British zoologist

Peter Lawrence FRS
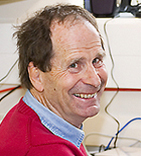
- Born: Peter Anthony Lawrence; 23 June 1941 (age 84)
- Education: Wennington School
- Alma mater: University of Cambridge (BA, PhD)
- Known for: Work on Drosophila melanogaster
- Spouse: Birgitta Haraldson (m. 1971)
- Awards: Harkness Fellowship (1965–67); EMBO Member (1976); Fellow of the Royal Society (1983); Prince of Asturias Prize (2007)
- Scientific career
- Institutions: University of Cambridge; Laboratory of Molecular Biology
- Thesis: The determination and development of hairs and bristles in the milkweed bug (Oncopeltus fasciatus Dall) (1966)
- Doctoral advisor: Vincent Wigglesworth
- Website: making-of-a-fly.me www.zoo.cam.ac.uk/directory/peter-lawrence

Peter Anthony Lawrence FRS (born 23 June 1941) is a British developmental biologist and geneticist. He was a staff scientist of the MRC Laboratory of Molecular Biology from 1969 to 2006 and has worked in the Zoology Department of the University of Cambridge from 2006 to present.

== Education ==
Lawrence was educated at Wennington School in Wetherby, and then at St Catharine's College, Cambridge; he gained his doctorate as a student of Vincent Wigglesworth for work on Oncopeltus fasciatus (milkweed bug).

== Career and research ==
Lawrence's main discoveries lie in trying to understand the information that shapes an animal or generates a pattern (such as on a butterfly wing or a fingerprint). He is a principal advocate of the theory that cells in a gradient of a morphogen each develop according to the local concentration of that morphogen and that this mechanism thereby patterns fields of cells. Together with Ginés Morata, he has helped establish the compartment theory. Under this hypothesis a set of cells collectively builds a precisely defined territory (or compartment) in the animal. As development proceeds, a selector gene switches on in a subset of these cells thus dividing the set into two, all the progeny of each set construct one of the two adjacent compartments. Much of the evidence for the hypothesis comes from studies on the abdomen of Oncopeltus and the Drosophila fly wing.

Since the mid 1990s he has collaborated with José Casal, Gary Struhl, and others to study Planar Cell Polarity (PCP) and cell affinity. PCP is a common property of cells which can show coordinated polarity in the plane of the epithelia. PCP is often revealed by the consistent orientation of visible structures such as cuticular bristles in insects or hairs in mammals. Using the powerful genetics of Drosophila, particularly the ability to make genetic mosaics, Lawrence and his colleagues provided evidence that there are two separate molecular/genetic systems that build PCP. At the heart of each system is a gradient of a molecule that extends across the tissue. The local slopes of these gradients are detected by means of molecules that form intercellular bridges and are used to orient PCP in each cell. Casal, Lawrence and their group have now demonstrated and measured the two molecular gradients in vivo.

== Publications ==
Lawrence wrote the book The Making of a Fly in 1992, which explains how the body plans of flies are constructed. Findings on the fly have strong implications for other animals such as mammals. The book received media attention in 2011 after biologist Michael Eisen noticed that it was listed for sale on Amazon.com for US$23,698,655.93 (equivalent to $33,917,825 in 2025) plus shipping. This was apparently caused by two pricing algorithms automatically increasing their prices to outprice one another continuously. The feedback loop was noticed and the book's price was lowered. Margrethe Vestager, former European Commissioner for Competition, mentioned this event as an early example of algorithmic tacit collusion in a 2017 speech at the German Federal Cartel Office's 18th Conference on Competition.

Lawrence has also written many commentaries on the ethics of science practice, as well as obituaries of Michael Berridge, Sydney Brenner, Francis Crick, and Ed Lewis.

== Awards and honours ==
Lawrence was awarded membership of the European Molecular Biology Organization (EMBO) in 1976; he was elected a Fellow of the Royal Society in 1983; awarded the Darwin Medal in 1994; and with Ginés Morata was a recipient of the Prince of Asturias Prize for scientific research in 2007; he was elected a foreign member of the Royal Swedish Academy of Sciences in 2000. In 2000 he was awarded the Waddington Medal from the British Society for Developmental Biology, for major contributions to developmental biology in the UK. In 2011 he was awarded the Lifetime Achievement Award of the Society for Developmental Biology.

== Personal life ==
Lawrence married Birgitta Haraldson in 1971.
