= Backward invention =

Backward invention is a product strategy in international marketing in which an existing product may have to be re-engineered or dumbed down by the company to be released in Less Developed Countries, often at a cheaper rate.

Doing so can often breathe new life into an obsolete product by the company or even target people too poor to afford the actual product.

== Definition ==
There are two definitions for a backward invention:

1. "Reintroducing earlier product forms that can be well adapted to a foreign country’s needs."
2. "Redesigning and producing a product for specific foreign markets after it is obsolete in industrialized countries."

== Examples ==
The National Cash Register Company reintroduced a dumbed down version of its crank-operated cash register at a lower cost for South American and African markets.

Another example would be of the German book-publishing giant Bertelsmann in Ukraine, where the average person's salary is less and bookstores are hard to find. The old-fashioned book club is enjoying huge popularity there, whereas it has seen a decline in its Book-of-the-Month and Literary Guild units in both the United States and Europe. In Ukraine, however, these clubs are seeing profit margins triple the 4% global average. Bertelsmann also finds that these clubs draw a younger following than in the United States. The publisher also keeps prices low because its main competitor in Ukraine is the open air book market, where books sell very cheaply.

== See also ==
- Invention
