= Product strategy =

Plan for how a company will create, develop, and market its products

Product strategy defines the high-level plan for developing and marketing a product, how the product supports the business strategy and goals, and is brought to life through product roadmaps. A product strategy describes a vision of the future with this product, the ideal customer profile and market to serve, go-to-market and positioning (marketing), thematic areas of investment, and measures of success. A product strategy sets the direction for new product development. Companies utilize the product strategy in strategic planning and marketing to set the direction of the company's activities. The product strategy is composed of a variety of sequential processes in order for the vision to be effectively achieved. The strategy must be clear in terms of the target customer and market of the product in order to plan the roadmap needed to achieve strategic goals and give customers better value.

== Goals of product strategy ==
Product strategy aims to provide context for what the product and business intend to achieve, the target customers and market, and the work required to accomplish these goals.

Vision describes what the company is trying to achieve. Vision helps stakeholders understand its strategic direction of the company.

Execution is defined by the product roadmap. While the product strategy outlines the elements of the product and the company's target market, the product roadmap explains how the vision will be executed

Big picture context provides the background of each feature and how it relates to larger goals. It also include details in which certain features will be built, and in what order.

Initiatives are the high-level efforts that help achieve goals. For example, performance improvements and expansion of markets.

=== Elements ===
- Design - What is the target product market? What design feature(s) will be added that makes it stand out from other companies? For example, attractive product design draws more customers towards the product.
- Features - What features will be added to increase the benefits offered to the target market? How does the product differ from the other competing companies products? "Marketing is not about providing products or services, it is essentially about providing changing benefits to the changing needs and demands of the customer" Product features differentiate amongst competitors.
- Quality - A product's quality should be consistent to make sure that the product meets the expectations of their target market. Thus, strengthening the firm's reputation.
- Branding - Brands have the power of instant sales and they convey the message of confidence, quality and reliability to their target market. It is also used a tool for companies to differentiate itself from their competitors.
- Target Market - Identify who is being sold to. Who should the product appeal to? How will customers view the product in the marketplace? "The organization's marketing task is to determine the needs, wants and interests of target markets and to achieve the desired results more effectively and efficiently than competitors, in a way that preserves or enhances the consumer's or society's well-being."
- Positioning - How does the company plan to position its product in the market? Different factors will need to be considered when the product is positioned in the marketplace as it will impact consumers perceptions about the product and brand. For example, how to price the product and the quality of it.

=== Process ===
1. Generating - Using SWOT analysis (strengths, weaknesses, opportunities, threats) and current market trends to generate ideas. The company may want to develop several different roadmaps to suit different types of projects along with risks management involved.
2. Screening the Idea - Set specific criteria for the product ideas in terms of if it should be continued or diminished. Will customers in the market benefit from this product?
3. Testing the Concept - Using quantitative or qualitative responses to assess consumer responses to the product idea before introducing the product to the marketplace.
4. Business Analytics - A detailed marketing strategy will be included in terms of whether the product will be profitable in the marketplace. This will also include the reactions from the target markets and product positioning to evaluate if there's demand from the market.
5. Marketability Tests - Prototype product will be introduced followed by a test of the product along with the proposed marketing plan. Modification can be made when necessary.
6. Technicalities and Product Development - Prototype will be created in the marketplace allowing exact and real life investigations, product specifications and any manufacturing methods. This stage also includes the process of logistics plan, supplier collaboration, engineering operations planning and quality management.
7. Commercialize - Product will be launched into the market alongside advertisements and other promotions.
8. Post Launch Review and Perfect Pricing - Review of the market performance in order to assess the success of the project on the entire product portfolio. This stage will also include product costs and the forecast of future profit and revenue, differing price and using competitive technologies for competition in the market. Value chain analysis will be useful for this stage of the process.

=== Pros ===
- Basis - The product strategy forms the basis of implementing a product roadmap. It allows the company to manage and measure for success, minimize the risks and to focus on a specific target market.
- Creates value - A strategy that focuses on specific target markets highlights the cost and durability of a product compared to other products, which adds on value towards customers and potential customers. It can also win businesses with improved performance, thus increasing reputation and revenue.
- Non-price competition - Allows businesses to compete in other areas other than price. For example, taste and design.
- Customer-centric approach - The company will be able to keep up with changes in the marketplace as it approaches to targeting customers. Thus, the company will know how to advance products tailored to a way that it satisfies consumers expectations.

=== Cons ===
- Marketing and Sales Demands - Tailoring products to certain target markets requires increased administration efforts, thus a higher number of staffs required.
- Higher Costs - Cost to customise and research into certain products in terms of a certain target market is expensive, as well as the increase number of staffs hired.
- Consistency Challenges - If the company fails to provide an efficient and effective product to a certain market, there may be a negative damage to the brand's image. Thus, the company needs to maintain a consistent standard of quality of its product.
- Product-Centric Focus - The company can get too focused on a certain product's research and development aimed towards a certain market and fail to response efficiently to changes in customers demand and interest.
- Risks - Market and customer research may not be sufficient, leading to product development that do not meet the needs of potential customers. Thus, failure in delivering benefits of the product to customers.

=== Example ===
Product differentiation occurs when companies have to distinguish a certain product in the marketplace when competing for a product that bring about the same need (e.g. tea) amongst different firms. In order to do so, the aim is to make the product more attractive to the marketplace compared to other competitors. This does not only include price, but also features of the product, quality, packaging, benefits and services. Successful product differentiation creates a comparative advantage for the firm.

As an example, a companies competitor in the market sells Tea A but they sell Tea B, so the company will then have to focus on producing Tea B so that consumers find their product to be more appealing (in terms of price, taste and services) compared to their competitors.

== Product life cycle concept ==
The product life cycle concept consist of 4 stages: introduction, growth, maturity, obsolescence. It outlines the stages the product was first introduced into the market until it is finally removed from the market. The length of the life cycle, duration of each stage and the shape of the curve vary widely for different products. Not all products reach the final stage and some may continue to rise or even fall.

=== Introduction ===
- Critical Factor - Product Development and Design
- Researching, developing and launching the product.
- Product passes through a low volume introduction phase where unit profit margin is low and sales volume starts to rise.

=== Growth ===
- Critical factor - Advertising and Distribution
- Sales increasing at a faster rate.
- Volume and profit both starts to rise.

=== Maturity ===
- Critical Factor - Marketing Effectiveness
- Unit profit margin at its highest but the rate of sales volume is slowing down. For example, there are now new competitors in the market.

=== Decline ===
- Reducing sales
- Constant cost
- Reducing profits.

=== Obsolescence ===
- Critical Factor - Cost Efficiency
- Sales and profit began to fall.
- Declining volume pushes costs up until all profits are eliminated.
- This may be due to the need of disappearing or a better and cheaper product has been developed in the market.

To extend a life of the product, techniques include advertising, price reduction (attract new customers), adding value to the product (new features), explore new markets (selling the product overseas) and new packaging (freshen up old packaging).

== Product platform strategy ==
Beyond individual product strategy is platform strategy, where the focus is on multiple products. There are two very different types of platforms: digital platforms in technology and physical platforms in other fields.

A digital platform is an ecosystem designed to enable different groups to co-create value through “plug-and-play” capabilities. The technology infrastructure of the platform touches customers and developers beyond the firm's boundaries. LinkedIn, Facebook, Google and Amazon—in fact most technology businesses—have platform-based business models.

Physical platforms in other industries refer to product family or product portfolio platforms intended to reduce manufacturing and development costs for new products. In this case a platform is a common architecture, collection of assets, component designs, subsystems, or other elements shared by several products. Given that the components and subsystems have already been debugged and tested, the resulting products should have higher quality. Since platform development occurs less frequently than product development, major platform decisions do not need to be made as often. This has the potential to foster lean product development. However, there are downsides: high upfront costs, risk of platform obsolescence, risk of platform recall affecting numerous products, and potential duplication of effort.

== See also ==
- Product management
- Product planning
- Strategic planning
- Marketing
- Design strategy
- Product design
- Philip Kotler
- New product development
- Concept testing
- Product life-cycle management (marketing)
- Product differentiation
