= Lynne Pepall =

Canadian economist

- Occupations: Economist, academic and researcher
- Awards: Common Wealth Scholar; German Marshall Fellowship

Academic background
- Education: B.A., Mathematics and Economics; Ph.D., Economics
- Alma mater: University of Toronto; University of Cambridge
- Thesis: Product Choice and Hedonic Pricing

Lynne Pepall is a Canadian-American economist, academic and researcher. She is an Economics Professor and currently chairs the Department of Community Health at Tufts University.

Pepall has published numerous research papers in the field of microeconomics and industrial organization. She has authored 4 books including Industrial Organization: Contemporary Theory and Practice, Industrial Organization: Contemporary Theory and Empirical Applications, Contemporary Industrial Organization: A Quantitative Approach, and Microeconomics For Dummies.

== Education ==
Pepall graduated in Mathematics and Economics from University of Toronto. She then moved to the UK and joined Trinity College at University of Cambridge in 1976. She received her doctoral degree in economics in 1983 from University of Cambridge.

== Career ==
Pepall started as a Research Fellow at the European University Institute in Florence, Italy, and then an assistant professor at Concordia University in 1983. In 1987, she joined Tufts University as an assistant professor of economics, and was promoted to associate professor in 1992 and to Professor in 2003.

Pepall chaired the Department of Economics for a year in 2005. From 2006 till 2013, she served as Dean of the Graduate School of Arts and Sciences and served as vice-president of University Faculty Senate from 2019 till 2020, and elected Senate president June 2020. She was appointed as Chair of Department of Community Health in July 2019.

== Research ==
Pepall has conducted research on microeconomics related subjects, focusing especially on industrial organization. She studied first mover advantages and the optimal strategies of the first entrant in a case of sequential entry in a new product market. She explored introductory price strategies and brand loyalty as new market entry strategies and the impact of a brand stretching entry strategy.

Pepall has investigated optimal patent policy to promote innovation when rivals may imitate new products, and early on explored the impact of product quality and social welfare in the case of competition by imitation.

Pepall conducted research on Cournot firms' competition in spatially different markets and focused on the profitability and locational effects of mergers. Her study indicated two-firm merger to be profitable due to easy coordination in locational decisions. She also highlighted further advantages of two-firm mergers and on the welfare effects of mergers in both vertically differentiated and horizontally-differentiated markets, including health-care markets.

In her paper in early 2000s, Pepall discussed a model, having brand identity as a complementary part, for the analysis of brand stretching. She highlighted the characteristics of the brand stretching entry strategy as implied by her work.

Pepall conducted research on differentiated downstream market and specialized upstream market and analyzed various types of vertical relation between the two market sectors along with identifying different benchmarks regarding the study. Degree of product differentiation in the downstream firms was found to be the key factor influencing prices and profitability of various market organizations.

In the late 2000s, Pepall researched on advertising decisions regarding a homogeneous product and presented how various approaches to model the mechanism through which advertising affected demand, might lead to inefficiently low advertising. She introduced a model that provided an explanation for the fluctuation of advertising intensity with regard to the concentration.

== Awards and honors ==
- 1976-79 Commonwealth Scholar
- 1980 - Fellowship, Social Science and Humanities
- 1994-1995 - Fellowship, German Marshall

== Bibliography ==
=== Books ===
- Industrial Organization: Contemporary Theory and Practice (1999) ISBN 978-0538859486
- Industrial Organization: Contemporary Theory and Empirical Applications (2008) ISBN 978-1405176323
- Contemporary Industrial Organization: A Quantitative Approach (2011) ISBN 9781118138984
- Microeconomics For Dummies (2016) ISBN 978-1119184393

=== Selected articles ===
- Pepall, L. M., & Richards, D. J. (1994). Innovation, imitation, and social welfare. Southern Economic Journal, 673–684.
- Pepall, L., & Norman, G. (2001). Product Differentiation and Upstream‐Downstream Relations. Journal of Economics & Management Strategy, 10(2), 201–233.
- Pepall, L. M., & Richards, D. J. (2002). The simple economics of brand stretching. The Journal of Business, 75(3), 535–552.
- Gabszewicz, J., Pepall, L., & Thisse, J. F. (1992). Sequential entry with brand loyalty caused by consumer learning-by-using. The Journal of Industrial Economics, 397–416.
- Norman, G., Pepall, L., & Richards, D. (2008). Generic product advertising, spillovers, and market concentration. American Journal of Agricultural Economics, 90(3), 719–732.
- Pepall, L. M. & Reiff, J. (2017). Advertising, Consumer Targeting and Peer Effects: The Impact of Banning Advertising to Children in Quebec. Review of Industrial Organization, 51 (3), 235–256.
