= Oligopolistic reaction =

An oligopolistic reaction is a concept from economics introduced by Frederick T. Knickerbocker to explain why firms follow rivals into foreign markets. Under conditions of growth in an economy, US firms match the investments of competitors into that economy. Also called follow-the-leader behavior. Used to understand the global flows of foreign direct investments (FDI) and thereby the structure of the world economy.

== See also ==
- Oligopoly
- Tacit collusion
