= Ecological model of competition =

The ecological model of competition is a reassessment of the nature of competition in the economy. Traditional economics models the economy on the principles of physics (force, equilibrium, inertia, momentum, and linear relationships). This can be seen in the economics lexicon: terms like labour force, market equilibrium, capital flows, and price elasticity. This is probably due to historical coincidence. Classical Newtonian physics was the state of the art in science when Adam Smith was formulating the first principles of economics in the 18th century.

According to the ecological model, it is more appropriate to model the economy on biology (growth, change, death, evolution, survival of the fittest, complex inter-relationships, non-linear relationships). Businesses operate in a complex environment with interlinked sets of determinants. Companies co-evolve: they influence, and are influenced by, competitors, customers, governments, investors, suppliers, unions, distributors, banks, and others. We should look at this business environment as a business ecosystem that both sustains, and threatens the firm. A company that is not well matched to its environment might not survive. Companies that are able to develop a successful business model and turn a core competency into a sustainable competitive advantage will thrive and grow. Very successful firms may come to dominate their industry (referred to as category killers).

== See also ==
- Competitor analysis
- Marketing
- Oligopoly
- Strategic management
- Sustainable competitive advantage
- Dominant Design
