= The Making of a Fly =

1992 book by Peter Anthony Lawrence

The Making of a Fly: The Genetics of Animal Design
- First edition cover
- Author: Peter Anthony Lawrence
- Subject: Drosophila
- Publication date: April 15, 1992
- Pages: 228
- ISBN: 978-0632030484

The Making of a Fly: The Genetics of Animal Design is a 1992 non-fiction book by Peter Anthony Lawrence about the molecular and developmental biology of the fly genus Drosophila. It is a key reference work in the study of the genus and the field of developmental biology in general.

== Contents ==
The book covers various aspects of the biology of Drosophila, a scientifically important genus in genetic research and a common model organism in developmental biology. Chapters cover the subjects of segmentation, compartments, segment identity, muscle development, intrasegmental patterning, bristle spacing, and eye development. The book contains personal reflections from the author regarding his studies and experiences.

== Reception ==
The Making of a Fly has been praised for its concise distillation of a large field of study into a compact and easily understood format. Reviewer Kathryn Anderson noted that the book's "chatty, easy-to-read style" makes it ideal for those wanting an overview of the then-current scientific understanding of Drosophila development, though she also noted that in some cases the informal writing style may make concepts more difficult to understand. Reviewer Richard W. Padgett noted that Lawrence's personal biases influence the text, such as when he says that genetics and developmental biology are "more fun" than molecular biology, although he stated that "in spite of his apparent prejudices, Lawrence does a good job intermixing descriptions of genetic, developmental, and molecular experimentation". Gerald M. Rubin reviewed the book by saying that he would recommend it for "any graduate student, post-doctoral researcher or professor in the fields of development, cell biology, or genetics", though he also stated that it might be too advanced for undergraduate students.

The book received media attention in 2011 after biologist Michael Eisen noticed that it was listed for sale on Amazon.com for US$23,698,655.93 (equivalent to $33,917,825 in 2025) plus shipping. This was apparently caused by two pricing algorithms automatically increasing their prices to outprice one another continuously. The feedback loop was noticed and the book's price was lowered. Lawrence commented that the situation was "funny" and that he "was hoping it would go up to a billion". Margrethe Vestager, former European Commissioner for Competition, mentioned this event as an early example of algorithmic tacit collusion in a 2017 speech at the German Federal Cartel Office's 18th Conference on Competition.
