= Multimarket contact =

Multimarket contact occurs when firms compete with the same rivals in multiple markets. When firms compete with each other in more than one market, their competitive behavior may differ from that of single-market rivals. Multimarket contact gives a firm the option to respond to actions or attacks by a rival not only in the market being challenged, but also in other markets where they both compete. As a result, multimarket competitors may hesitate to attack in one market for fear of retaliation in other markets. Multimarket competition may therefore reduce the competitive intensity among rivals, an effect known as mutual forbearance.
