= Conspiracy theory (legal term) =

Concept in law

A conspiracy theory in the context of law is a theory of a case that presents a conspiracy to be considered by a trier of fact. (Note: In popular usage, a 'conspiracy theory' is a theory that invokes a conspiracy without credible evidence.) (Note: The phrase 'conspiracy theory' has been used in this sense in court cases since at least 1900.) A basic tenet of "traditional 'conspiracy theory'" is that each co-conspirator is liable for acts of co-conspirators "during the existence of and in furtherance of the conspiracy". Procedures and proof requirements for conspiracy theory litigation as well as the definition of 'conspiracy' vary by jurisdiction (British, U.S., …) and body of law (criminal, civil, …). In civil litigation, it can offer advantages relative to aiding-and-abetting or joint tortfeasor case theories.

== Conspiracy, theory, and conspiracy theory litigation ==
In popular usage, the term ‘conspiracy’ means a secret agreement of two or more persons usually to commit a bad act. In a broad legal sense, it is an agreement to commit an unlawful act; in British and some American courts, lawful acts finish in an unlawful manner (in British parlance, a ‘conspiracy to injure’; in American, a ‘true conspiracy’) are also included. Some states require an overt act. (Common law rule does not.) Whereas in a criminal conspiracy, the substantive offense is a crime, in civil law, the wrong is most likely a recognized intentional tort.

A theory of a case (aka ‘case theory’) is “a detailed, coherent, accurate story of what occurred" involving both legal theory (i.e., claims/causes of action or affirmative defenses) and factual theory (i.e., an explanation of how a particular course of events could have happened).

Particular classes of conspiracy theories address, e.g., antitrust (per Sherman Act, 15 U.S.C. § 1) and RICO. (Note: RICO is sometimes seen as an expansion of traditional conspiracy theory.) A prominent concept in conspiracy law is Pinkerton liability where a conspiracy theory can be used to hold a co-conspirator liable for a substantive offense committed by another co-conspirator “if the offense was a reasonably foreseeable consequence of the agreement”. (Note: Collins v United States citing Wilson–Bey v. United States) In civil law, a conspiracy theory 1) exempts co-conspirator testimony from the rule against hearsay; 2) exposes deep-pocket defendants to more liability than available under an aiding-and-abetting theory; 3) can impose joint liability on non-residents of the jurisdiction not liable under joint tortfeasor theory.

== Taxonomy ==
From a 9th Circuit case: "In the taxonomy of conspiracy theories, a 'chain conspiracy' is one in which each person is responsible for a distinct act within the overall plan, while a 'wheel conspiracy' involves a single member or group, i.e., the 'hub', separately agreeing with two or more other members or groups, i.e., the 'spokes'."

== Examples of term conspiracy theory in use ==
- Justice Sonia Sotomayor: "A conspiracy theory says you don't have to commit every act." (Comment during oral argument in Husky International Electronics, Inc., v. Daniel Lee Ritz, Jr.)
- In Federal jury instructions: "… There was evidence that the defendant masterminded the narcotics conspiracy and the plan to rob the undercover officer, and that evidence fully justified the defendant's conviction on an accomplice or conspiracy theory, regardless of where he was on the date of the murder. United States v. Thomas, 34 F.3d 44, 49 (2d Cir.), cert. denied, 513 U.S. 1007, 115 S.Ct. 527, 130 L.Ed.2d 431 (1994)." (1A Fed. Jury Prac. & Instr. § 19:07 (6th ed.) Alibi—Explained, Second Circuit)
- In preparation for the Nuremberg trials: "The American proposal is that we utilize the conspiracy theory by which a common plan or understanding to accomplish an illegal end by any mean, or to accomplish any end by illegal means, renders everyone who participated liable for the acts of every other." (From the Minutes of Conference Session of July 4, 1945. Document XX, in 'Robert Jackson' (U.S. Supreme Court justice and future US Chief Prosecutor at the International Military Tribunal in Nuremberg, supra n 44, at 129, as cited by Yanev in Theories of Co-perpetration in International Criminal Law with italics added by Yanev.)

== In popular culture as a legal term ==
Jack McCoy (of Law & Order): "Basic conspiracy theory, Your Honor. The left hand doesn't have to know what the right hand is doing, so long as they share a common criminal purpose."

== See also ==
- Conspiracy (criminal) — where the substantive offense is a crime.
- Conspiracy (civil) — where the substantive offense is a civil wrong.
- Conscious parallelism — coordinated action of competitors missing evidence of an agreement
