= Oligopoly =

Market dominated by a small number of sellers

An oligopoly (from Ancient Greek ὀλίγος (olígos) 'few' and πωλέω (pōléō) 'to sell') is a market in which pricing control lies in the hands of a few sellers. As a result of their significant market power, firms in oligopolistic markets can influence prices through manipulating the supply function. Firms in an oligopoly are mutually interdependent, as any action by one firm is expected to affect other firms in the market and evoke a reaction or consequential action. As a result, firms in oligopolistic markets often resort to collusion as means of maximising profits.

Nonetheless, in the presence of fierce competition among market participants, oligopolies may develop without collusion. This is a situation similar to perfect competition, where oligopolists have their own market structure. In this situation, each company in the oligopoly has a large share in the industry and plays a pivotal, unique role.

Many jurisdictions deem collusion to be illegal as it violates competition laws and is regarded as anti-competition behaviour. The EU competition law in Europe prohibits anti-competitive practices such as price-fixing and competitors manipulating market supply and trade. In the US, the United States Department of Justice Antitrust Division and the Federal Trade Commission are tasked with stopping collusion. In Australia, the Federal Competition and Consumer Act 2010 details the prohibition and regulation of anti-competitive agreements and practices. Although aggressive, these laws typically only apply when firms engage in formal collusion, such as cartels. Corporations may often thus evade legal consequences through tacit collusion, as collusion can only be proven through direct communication between companies.

Within post-socialist economies, oligopolies may be particularly pronounced. For example in Armenia, where business elites enjoy oligopoly, 19% of the whole economy is monopolized, making it the most monopolized country in the region.

Many industries have been cited as oligopolistic, including civil aviation, electricity providers, the telecommunications sector, rail freight markets, food processing, funeral services, sugar refining, beer making, pulp and paper making, and automobile manufacturing.

== Types of oligopolies ==
=== Perfect and imperfect oligopolies ===
Perfect and imperfect oligopolies are often distinguished by the nature of the goods firms produce or trade in.

A perfect (sometimes called a 'pure') oligopoly is where the commodities produced by the firms are homogenous (i.e., identical or materially the same in nature) and the elasticity of substitute commodities is near infinite. Generally, where there are two homogenous products, a rational consumer's preference between the products will be indifferent, assuming the products share common prices. Similarly, sellers will be relatively indifferent between purchase commitments in relation to homogenous products. In an oligopolistic market of a primary industry, such as agriculture or mining, commodities produced by oligopolistic enterprises will have strong homogeneity; as such, such markets are described as perfect oligopolies.

Imperfect (or 'differentiated') oligopolies, on the other hand, involve firms producing commodities which are heterogenous. Where companies in an industry need to offer a diverse range of products and services, such as in the manufacturing and service industries, such industries are subject to imperfect oligopoly.

=== Open and closed oligopolies ===
An open oligopoly market structure occurs where barriers to entry do not exist, and firms can freely enter the oligopolistic market. In contrast, a closed oligopoly is where there are prominent barriers to market entry which preclude other firms from easily entering the market. Entry barriers include high investment requirements, strong consumer loyalty for existing brands, regulatory hurdles and economies of scale. These barriers allow existing firms in the oligopoly market to maintain a certain price on commodities and services in order to maximise profits.

=== Collusive oligopolies ===
Collusion among firms in an oligopoly market structure occurs where there are express or tacit agreements between firms to follow a particular price structure in relation to particular products (for homogenous products) or particular transaction or product classes (for heterogeneous products). Colluding firms are able to maximise profits at a level above the normal market equilibrium.

Interdependence in oligopolies is reduced when firms collude, because there is a lessened need for firms to anticipate the actions of other firms in relation to prices. Collusion closes the gap in the asymmetry of information typically present in a market of competing firms.

One form of collusive oligopoly is a cartel, a monopolistic organisation and relationship formed by manufacturers who produce or sell a certain kind of goods in order to monopolise the market and obtain high profits by reaching an agreement on commodity price, output and market share allocation. However, the stability and effectiveness of a cartel are limited, and members tend to break from the alliance in order to gain short-term benefits.

=== Partial and full oligopoly ===
A full oligopoly is one in which a price leader is not present in the market, and where firms enjoy relatively similar market control. A partial oligopoly is one where a single firm dominates an industry through saturation of the market, producing a high percentage of total output and having large influence over market conditions. Partial oligopolies are able to price-make rather than price-take.

=== Tight and loose oligopoly ===
In a tight oligopoly, only a few firms dominate the market, and there is limited competition. A loose oligopoly, on the other hand, has many interdependent firms which often collude to maximise profits. Markets can be classified into tight and loose oligopolies using the four-firm concentration ratio, which measures the percentage market share of the top four firms in the industry. The higher the four-firm concentration ratio is, the less competitive the market is. When the four-firm concentration ration is higher than 60, the market can be classified as a tight oligopoly. A loose oligopoly occurs when the four-firm concentration is in the range of 40-60.

== Characteristics of oligopolies ==
Some characteristics of oligopolies include:

- Profit maximisation
- Price setting: Firms in an oligopoly market structure tend to set prices rather than adopt them.
- High barriers to entry and exit: Important barriers include government licenses, economies of scale, patents, access to expensive and complex technology, and strategic actions by incumbent firms designed to discourage or destroy nascent firms. Additional sources of barriers to entry often result from government regulation favouring existing firms.
- Few firms in the market: When there are few firms in the market, the actions of one firm can influence the actions of the others.
- Abnormal long-run profits: High barriers of entry prevent sideline firms from entering the market to capture excess profits. If the firms are colluding in the oligopoly, they can set the price at a high profit-maximising level.
- Perfect and imperfect knowledge: Oligopolies have perfect knowledge of their own cost and demand functions, but their inter-firm information may be incomplete. If firms in an oligopoly collude, information between firms then may become perfect. Buyers, however, only have imperfect knowledge as to price, cost, and product quality.
- Interdependence: A distinctive feature of oligopolies is interdependence. Oligopolistic firms must take into consideration the possible reactions of all competing firms and the firms' countermoves. Every oligopolistic company with strong commodity homogeneity in its industry is reluctant to raise or lower prices, as competing firms will be aware of a firm's market actions and will respond appropriately. Anticipation among firms about potential counteractions leads to price rigidity, with firms usually only willing to adjust prices and quantities of output in accordance with a price leader. This high degree of interdependence stands in contrast with the lack of interdependence in other market structures. In a perfectly competitive market, there is zero interdependence because no firm is large enough to affect market prices. In a monopoly, there are no competitors to be concerned about. In a monopolistically-competitive market, each firm's effects on market conditions are so negligible that they can be safely ignored by competitors.
- Non-price competition: Generally, the oligopolistic enterprise with the largest scale and lowest cost will become the price setter in this market. The price set by it will maximise its own interests, such that other small-scale enterprises may also benefit. Oligopolies tend to compete on terms other than price, as non-price competition, such as promotional efforts, is less risky. Along non-price dimensions, collusion is harder to sustain.

== Sources of oligopoly power ==
=== Economies of scale ===
Economies of scale occur where a firm's average costs per unit of output decreases while the scale of the firm, or the output being produced by the firm, increases. Firms in an oligopoly who benefit from economies of scale have a distinct advantage over firms who do not. Their marginal costs are lower, such that the firm's equilibrium at $MR = MC$ would be higher. Economies of scale are seen prevalently when two firms in oligopolistic market agree to a merger, as it allows the firm to not only diversify their market but also increase in size and output production, with negligible relative increases in output costs. These sorts of mergers are typically seen when companies expand into large business groups by appreciating and increasing capital to buy smaller companies in the same markets, which consequently increases the profit margins of the business.

=== Collusion and price cutting ===
In a market with low entry barriers, price collusion between established sellers makes new sellers vulnerable to undercutting. Recognising this vulnerability, established sellers will reach a tacit understanding to raise entry barriers to prevent new companies from entering the market. Even if this requires cutting prices, all companies benefit because they reduce the risk of loss created by new competition. In other words, firms will lose less for deviation and thus have more incentive to undercut collusion prices when more join the market. The rate at which firms interact with one another will also affect the incentives for undercutting other firms; short-term rewards for undercutting competitors are short lived where interaction is frequent, as a degree of punishment can expected swiftly by other firms, but longer-lived where interaction is infrequent. Greater market transparency, for instance, would decrease collusion, as oligopolistic companies expect retaliation sooner where changes in their prices and quantity of sales are clear to their rivals.

=== Barriers to enter the market ===
Large capital investments required for entry, including intellectual property laws, certain network effects, absolute cost advantages, reputation, advertisement dominance, product differentiation, brand reliance, and others, all contribute to keeping existing firms in the market and precluding new firms from entering.

== Modeling oligopolies ==
There is no single model that describes the operation of an oligopolistic market. The variety and complexity of the models exist because numerous firms can compete on the basis of price, quantity, technological innovations, marketing, and reputation. However, there are a series of simplified models that attempt to describe market behavior under certain circumstances. Some of the better-known models are the dominant firm model, the Cournot–Nash model, the Bertrand model and the kinked demand model. As different industries have different characteristics, oligopoly models differ in their applicability within each industry.

=== Game theoretical models ===
With few sellers, each oligopolist is likely to be aware of the actions of their competition. According to game theory, the decisions of one firm influence, and are influenced by, the decisions of other firms. Strategic planning by oligopolists needs to take into account the likely responses of the other market participants. The following game-theoretical oligopoly models attempt to describe and predict the behaviour of oligopolies:

- Stackelberg's duopoly. In this model, the firms move sequentially to determine their quantities (see Stackelberg competition).
- Cournot's duopoly. In this model, the firms simultaneously choose quantities (see Cournot competition).
- Bertrand's oligopoly. In this model, the firms simultaneously choose prices (see Bertrand competition).

One major difference between varying industries is capacity constraints. Both Cournot model and Bertrand model consist of the two-stage game; the Cournot model is more suitable for firms in industries that face capacity constraints, where firms set their quantity of production first, then set their prices. The Bertrand model is more applicable for industries with low capacity constraints, such as banking and insurance.

==== Cournot-Nash model ====
The Cournot–Nash model is the simplest oligopoly model. The model assumes that there are two equally positioned firms; the firms compete on the basis of quantity rather than price, and each firm makes decisions on the assumption that the other firm's behaviour is unchanging. The market demand curve is assumed to be linear, and marginal costs constant.

In this model, the Nash equilibrium can be found by determining how each firm reacts to a change in the output of the other firm, and repeating this analysis until a point is reached where neither firm desires to act any differently, given their predictions of the other firm's responsive behaviour.

The equilibrium is the intersection of the two firm's reaction functions, which show how one firm reacts to the quantity choice of the other firm. The reaction function can be derived by calculating the first-order condition (FOC) of the firms' optimal profits. The FOC can be calculated by setting the first derivative of the objective function to zero. For example, assume that the firm $1$'s demand function is $P = (M - Q_2) - Q_1$, where $Q_2$ is the quantity produced by the other firm, $Q_1$ is the amount produced by firm $1$, and $M=60$ is the market. Assume that marginal cost is $C_M=12$. By following the profit maximisation rule of equating marginal revenue to marginal costs, firm $1$ can obtain a total revenue function of $R_T = Q_1 P = Q_1 (M - Q_2 - Q_1) = MQ_1 - Q_1 Q_2 - Q_1^2$. The marginal revenue function is $R_M = \frac{\partial R_T}{\partial Q_1} = M - Q_2 - 2 Q_1$. (Note: $R_M = M - Q_2 - 2Q_1$. can be restated as $R_M = (M - Q_2) - 2Q_1$.)

$$R_M = C_M$$
$$M - Q_2 - 2Q_1 = C_M$$
$$2Q_1 = (M - C_M) - Q_2$$
$Q_1 = \frac{M - C_M}{2} - \frac{Q_2}{2} = 24 - 0.5 Q_2$ [1.1]
$Q_2 = 2(M - C_M) - 2Q_1 = 96 - 2Q_1$ [1.2]

Equation 1.1 is the reaction function for firm $1$. Equation 1.2 is the reaction function for firm $2$. The Nash equilibrium can thus be obtained by solving the equations simultaneously or graphically.

Reaction functions are not necessarily symmetric. Firms may face differing cost functions, in which case the reaction functions and equilibrium quantities would not be identical.

==== Bertrand model ====
The Bertrand model is essentially the Cournot–Nash model, except the strategic variable is price rather than quantity.

Bertrand's model assumes that firms are selling homogeneous products and therefore have the same marginal production costs, and firms will focus on competing in prices simultaneously. After competing in prices for a while, firms would eventually reach an equilibrium where prices would be the same as marginal costs of production. The mechanism behind this model is that even by undercutting just a small increment of its price, a firm would be able to capture the entire market share. Even though empirical studies suggest that firms can easily make much higher profits by agreeing on charging a price higher than marginal costs, highly rational firms would still not be able to stay at a price higher than marginal cost. Whilst Bertrand price competition is a useful abstraction of markets in many settings, due to its lack of ability to capture human behavioural patterns, the approach has been criticised for being inaccurate in predicting prices.

The model assumptions are:

- There are two firms in the market
- They produce a homogeneous product
- They produce at a constant marginal cost
- Firms choose prices $P_A$ and $P_B$ simultaneously
- Firms outputs are perfect substitutes
- Sales are split evenly if $P_A = P_B$

The only Nash equilibrium is $P_A = P_B = \text{MC}$. In this situation, if a firm raises prices, it will lose all its customers. If a firm lowers price, $P < \text{MC}$, then it will lose money on every unit sold.

The Bertrand equilibrium is the same as the competitive result. Each firm produces where $P = \text{MC}$, resulting in zero profits. A generalization of the Bertrand model is the Bertrand–Edgeworth model, which allows for capacity constraints and a more general cost function.

==== Cournot-Bertrand model ====
The Cournot model and Bertrand model are the most well-known models in oligopoly theory, and have been studied and reviewed by numerous economists. The Cournot-Bertrand model is a hybrid of these two models and was first developed by Bylka and Komar in 1976. This model allows the market to be split into two groups of firms. The first group's aim is to optimally adjust their output to maximise profits, while the second group's aim is to optimally adjust their prices. This model is not accepted by some economists who believe that firms in the same industry cannot compete with different strategic variables. Nonetheless, this model has been applied and observed in both real-world examples and theoretical contexts.

In the Cournot model and Bertrand model, it is assumed that all the firms are competing with the same choice variable, either output or price. However, some economists have argued that this does not always apply in real world contexts. Economists Kreps and Scheinkman's research demonstrates that varying economic environments are required in order for firms to compete in the same industry while using different strategic variables. An example of the Cournot-Bertrand model in real life can be seen in the market of alcoholic beverages. The production times of alcoholic beverages differ greatly creating different economic environments within the market. The fermentation of distilled spirits takes a significant amount of time; therefore, output is set by producers, leaving the market conditions to determine price. Whereas, the production of brandy requires minimal time to age, thus the price is set by the producers and the supply is determined by the quantity demanded at that price.

=== Kinked demand curve model ===
In an oligopoly, firms operate under imperfect competition. The fierce price competitiveness, created by a sticky-upward demand curve, causes firms to use non-price competition in order to accrue greater revenue and market share.

"Kinked" demand curves appear similar to traditional demand curves but are distinguished by a hypothesised convex bend with a discontinuity at the bend–"kink". Thus, the first derivative at that point is undefined and leads to a jump discontinuity in the marginal revenue curve. Because of this jump discontinuity in the marginal revenue curve, marginal cost could change without necessarily changing the price or quantity. The motivation behind the kink is that in an oligopolistic or monopolistic competitive market, firms will not raise their prices because even a small price increase will lose many customers. However, even a large price decrease will gain only a few customers because such an action will begin a price war with other firms. The curve is, therefore, more price-elastic for price increases and less so for price decreases. This model predicts that more firms will enter the industry in the long run, since market price for oligopolists is more stable.

The kinked demand curve for a joint profit-maximizing oligopoly industry can model the behaviors of oligopolists' pricing decisions other than that of the price leader.

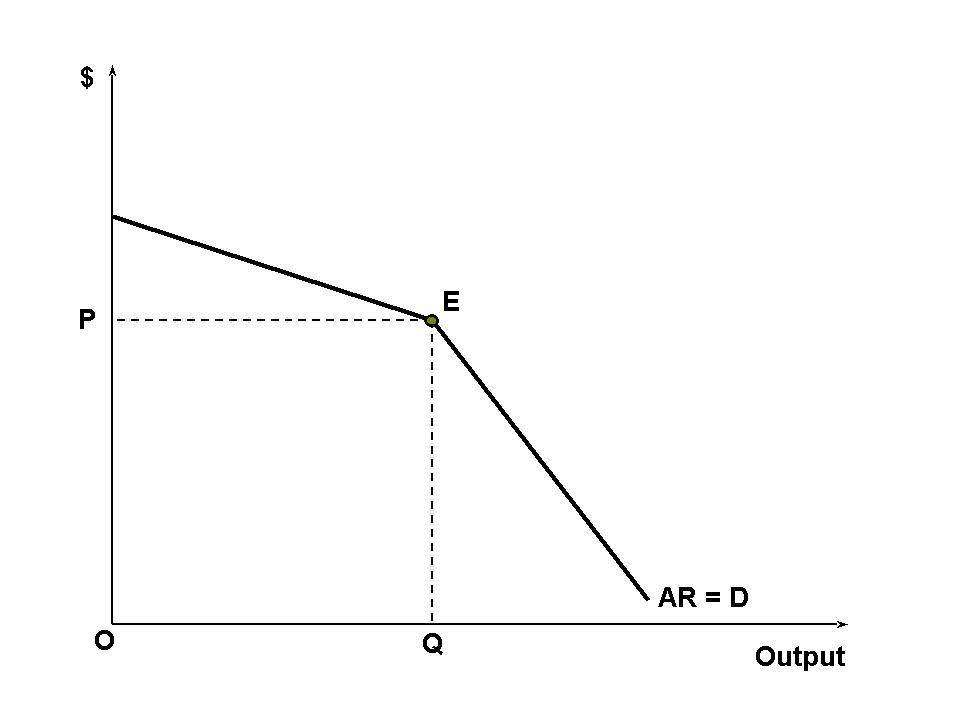
Above the kink, demand is relatively elastic because all other firms' prices remain unchanged. Below the kink, demand is relatively inelastic because all other firms will introduce a similar price cut, eventually leading to a price war. Therefore, the best option for the oligopolist is to produce at point $\text{E}$ which is the equilibrium point and the kink point. This is a theoretical model proposed in 1947, which has failed to receive conclusive evidence for support.

==== Assumptions ====
According to the kinked-demand model, each firm faces a demand curve kinked at the existing price. The assumptions of the model are:

- If a firm raises its price above the current existing price, competitors will not follow and the acting firm will lose market share.
- If a firm lowers prices below the existing price, their competitors will follow to retain their market share and the firm's output will increase only marginally.

If the assumptions hold, then:

- The firm's marginal revenue curve is discontinuous and not differentiable, having a gap at the kink.
- For prices above the prevailing price, the curve is relatively elastic.
- For prices below the point, the curve is relatively inelastic.

The gap in the marginal revenue curve means that marginal costs can fluctuate without changing equilibrium price and quantity Thus, prices tend to be rigid.

=== Other descriptions ===
Market power and market concentration can be estimated or quantified using several different tools and measurements, including the Lerner index, stochastic frontier analysis, New Empirical Industrial Organization (NEIO) modeling, as well as the Herfindahl-Hirschman index. As a quantitative description of oligopoly, the four-firm concentration ratio is often utilised and is the most preferable ratio for analyzing market concentration. This measure expresses, as a percentage, the market share of the four largest firms in any particular industry. For example, as of fourth quarter 2008, the combined total market share of Verizon Wireless, AT&T, Sprint, and T-Mobile comprises 97% of the U.S. cellular telephone market.

== Oligopolies and competition laws ==
Oligopolies are assumed to be aware of competition laws as well as the repercussions that they could face if caught engaging in anti-competition behaviour. In lieu of explicit communication, firms may be observed as engaging in tacit collusion, which occurs through competitors collectively and implicitly understanding that by jointly raising prices, each competitor can achieve economic profits comparable to those achieved by a monopolist while avoiding breaches of market regulations.

=== Policing of anticompetitive behaviour ===
Competition authorities have taken various measures to effectively discover and prosecute oligopolistic and anticompetitive behaviour. The leniency program and screening are currently two popular mechanisms.

==== Leniency programs ====
Leniency programs encourage antitrust firms to be more proactive participants in confessing collusive behaviours by granting them immunity from fines, among other penal reductions. Leniency programs have been implemented by countries including the US, Japan and Canada. Nonetheless, leniency programs may be abused, their efficacy has been questioned, and they ultimately allow some colluding firms to experience less harsh penalties. It is currently unknown what the overall effect of leniency programs is.

Screening

There are two screening methods that are currently available for competition authorities: structural screening and behavioural screening. Structural screening refers to the identification of industry traits or characteristics, such as homogeneous goods, stable demand, less existing participants, which are prone to cartel formation. Behavioural screening is typically implemented when a cartel formation or agreement has already been reached, with authorities subsequently looking into firms' data to determine if price variance is low or experiences significant price changes.

== Possible outcomes of oligopolies ==
=== Formation of cartels ===
Particular companies may employ restrictive trade practices in order to inflate prices and restrict production in much the same way that a monopoly does. Whenever there is a formal agreement for such collusion between companies that usually compete with one another, the practice is known as a cartel. An example of an economic cartel is OPEC, where oligopolistic countries control the worldwide oil supply, leaving a profound influence on the international price of oil.

There are legal restrictions on cartels in most countries, with regulations and enforcement against cartels having been enacted since the late 1990s. For example, EU competition law has prohibited some unreasonable anti-competitive practices, such as directly or indirectly fixing selling prices, manipulating market supplies and controlling trade among competitors. In the US, the Antitrust Division of the Justice Department and Federal Trade Commission was created to fight collusion among cartels. Tacit collusion is becoming a more popular topic in the development of anti-trust law in most countries.

=== Possibility of efficient outcomes ===
Competition between sellers in an oligopoly can be fierce, with relatively low prices and high production. Hypothetically, this could lead to an efficient outcome approaching perfect competition.

As competition in an oligopoly can be greater when there are more competitors in an industry, it is theoretically harder to sustain cartels in an industry with a larger number of firms, as there will be less collusive profit for each firm. Consequently, existing firms may have more incentive to deviate. However, empirical evidence has shown this conclusion to be ambiguous. Thus, the welfare analysis of oligopolies is sensitive to the parameter values used to define the market's structure. In particular, the level of dead weight loss is hard to measure. The study of product differentiation indicates that oligopolies might also create excessive levels of differentiation in order to stifle competition, as they could gain certain marker power by offering somewhat differentiated products.

=== Price wars ===
One possible outcome of oligopoly is the price war. A common aspect of oligopolies is the ability to engage in price competition selectively. Schendel and Balestra contend that at least some players in a price war can profit from participation.

== Examples ==
Many industries have been cited as oligopolistic, including oil extraction and refinement, civil aviation, agricultural pesticides, electricity, and platinum group metal mining. In most countries, the telecommunications sector is characterized by an oligopolistic market structure.

=== Europe ===
In the European Union, rail freight markets have an oligopolistic structure.

==== United Kingdom ====
In the United Kingdom, the 'Big Four' supermarket chains - Tesco, Asda, Sainsbury's and Morrisons - is an oligopoly. The development of this oligopoly is believed to have resulted in a reduction of competition in the retail sector, coincides with the decline of independent high street retailers, and may also be affecting suppliers and farmers through monopsony.

=== North America ===
==== Canada ====
In Canada, supermarkets have been identified as oligopolistic, largely falling under only three chains. Other industries identified as oligopolistic include banks, telecommunications, and airlines.

==== United States ====
In the United States, industries that have identified as oligopolistic include food processing, funeral services, sugar refining, beer making, pulp and paper making, and mobile network carriers.

== See also ==
- Big business
- Conjectural variation
- Market failure
- Monopoly
- Monopsony
- Oligopolistic reaction
- Oligopsony
- Perfect competition
- Planned obsolescence
- Prisoner's dilemma
- Simulations and games in economics education
- Swing producer
- Unfair competition
