= Competition =

Rivalry for a goal which cannot be shared

Athletes competing in a 100 metres sprint

Juvenile glaucous-winged gulls competing over food

Competition is a rivalry where two or more parties strive for a common goal which cannot be shared: where one's gain is the other's loss (an example of which is a zero-sum game). Competition can arise between entities such as organisms, individuals, economic and social groups, etc. The rivalry can be over attainment of any exclusive goal, including recognition.

Competition occurs in nature, between living organisms which co-exist in the same environment. Animals compete over water supplies, food, mates, and other biological resources. Humans usually compete for food and mates, though when these needs are met deep rivalries often arise over the pursuit of wealth, power, prestige, and fame when in a static, repetitive, or unchanging environment. Competition is a major tenet of market economies and business, often associated with business competition as companies are in competition with at least one other firm over the same group of customers. Competition inside a company is usually stimulated with the larger purpose of meeting and reaching higher quality of services or improved products that the company may produce or develop.

Competition is often considered to be the opposite of cooperation; however, in the real world, mixtures of cooperation and competition are the norm. In economies, as the philosopher R. G. Collingwood argued "the presence of these two opposites together is essential to an economic system. The parties to an economic action co-operate in competing, like two chess players". Optimal strategies to achieve goals are studied in the branch of mathematics known as game theory.

Competition has been studied in several fields, including psychology, sociology and anthropology. Social psychologists, for instance, study the nature of competition. They investigate the natural urge of competition and its circumstances. They also study group dynamics, to detect how competition emerges and what its effects are. Sociologists, meanwhile, study the effects of competition on society as a whole. Additionally, anthropologists study the history and prehistory of competition in various cultures. They also investigate how competition manifested itself in various cultural settings in the past, and how competition has developed over time.

== Biology and ecology ==
Competition within, between, and among species is one of the most important forces in biology, especially in the field of ecology.

Competition between members of a species ("intraspecific") for resources such as food, water, territory, and sunlight may result in an increase in the frequency of a variant of the species best suited for survival and reproduction until its fixation within a population. However, competition among resources also has a strong tendency for diversification between members of the same species, resulting in coexistence of competitive and non-competitive strategies or cycles between low and high competitiveness. Third parties within a species often favour highly competitive strategies leading to species extinction when environmental conditions are harsh (evolutionary suicide).

Competition is also present between species ("interspecific"). When resources are limited, several species may depend on these resources. Thus, each of the species competes with the others to gain access to the resources. As a result, species less suited to compete for the resources may die out unless they adapt by character dislocation, for instance. According to evolutionary theory, this competition within and between species for resources plays a significant role in natural selection. At shorter time scales, competition is also one of the most important factors controlling diversity in ecological communities, but at larger scales expansion and contraction of ecological space is a much larger factor than competition. This is illustrated by living plant communities where asymmetric competition and competitive dominance frequently occur. Multiple examples of symmetric and asymmetric competition also exist for animals.

== Consumer competitions – games of luck or skill ==
In Australia, New Zealand and the United Kingdom, competitions or lotto are the equivalent of what are commonly known as sweepstakes in the United States. The correct technical name for Australian consumer competitions is a trade promotion lottery or lotto.

People that enjoy entering competitions are known as compers.

== Competitiveness ==
Many philosophers and psychologists have identified a trait in most living organisms which can drive the particular organism to compete. This trait, called competitiveness, is viewed as having a high adaptive value, which coexists along with the urge for survival. Competitiveness, or the inclination to compete, though, has become synonymous with aggressiveness and ambition in the English language. More advanced civilizations integrate aggressiveness and competitiveness into their interactions, as a way to distribute resources and adapt. Many plants compete with neighboring ones for sunlight.

The term also applies to econometrics. Here, it is a comparative measure of the ability and performance of a firm or sub-sector to sell and produce/supply goods and/or services in a given market. The two academic bodies of thought on the assessment of competitiveness are the Structure Conduct Performance Paradigm and the more contemporary New Empirical Industrial Organisation model. Predicting changes in the competitiveness of business sectors is becoming an integral and explicit step in public policymaking. Within capitalist economic systems, the drive of enterprises is to maintain and improve their own competitiveness.

One-upmanship, also called "one-upsmanship", is the art or practice of successively outdoing a competitor. The term was first used in the title of a book by Stephen Potter, published in 1952 as a follow-up to The Theory and Practice of Gamesmanship (or the Art of Winning Games without Actually Cheating) (1947), and Lifemanship titles in his series of tongue-in-cheek self-help books, and film and television derivatives, that teach various ploys to achieve this. This comic satire of self-help style guides manipulates traditional British conventions for the gamester, all life being a game, who understands that if you're not one-up, you're one-down. Potter's unprincipled principles apply to almost any possession, experience or situation, deriving maximum undeserved rewards and discomfitting the opposition. The 1960 film School for Scoundrels and its 2006 remake were satiric portrayals of how to use Potter's ideas.

In that context, the term refers to a satiric course in the gambits required for the systematic and conscious practice of "creative intimidation", making one's associates feel inferior and thereby gaining the status of being "one-up" on them. Viewed seriously, it is a phenomenon of group dynamics that can have significant effects in the management field: for instance, manifesting in office politics.

== Social ==
Social competition is the competition for social status or social power, examples include keeping up with the Joneses, female intrasexual competition or male intrasexual competition. Social competition can contribute to social stress.

== Education ==
Competition is a major factor in education. On a global scale, national education systems, intending to bring out the best in the next generation, encourage competitiveness among students through scholarships. Countries such as England and Singapore have special education programmes which cater for specialist students, prompting charges of academic elitism. Upon receipt of their academic results, students tend to compare their grades to see who is better. In severe cases, the pressure to perform in some countries is so high that it can result in stigmatization of intellectually deficient students, or even suicide as a consequence of failing the exams. Critics of competition as a motivating factor in education systems, such as Alfie Kohn, assert that competition actually has a net negative influence on the achievement levels of students, and that it "turns all of us into losers". Economist Richard Layard has commented on the harmful effects, stating "people feel that they are under a great deal of pressure. They feel that their main objective in life is to do better than other people. That is certainly what young people are being taught in school every day. And it's not a good basis for a society."

However, other studies such as the Torrance Tests of Creative Thinking show that the effect of competition on students depends on each individual's level of agency. Students with a high level of agency thrive on competition, are self-motivated, and are willing to risk failure. Compared to their counterparts who are low in agency, these students are more likely to be flexible, adaptable and creative as adults.

== Economics ==
Merriam-Webster gives as one definition of competition (relating to business) as "[...] rivalry: such as [...] the effort of two or more parties acting independently to secure the business of a third party by offering the most favorable terms". Adam Smith in his 1776 book The Wealth of Nations and later economists described competition in general as allocating productive resources to their most highly valued uses and encouraging efficiency. Later microeconomic theory distinguished between perfect competition and imperfect competition, concluding that no system of resource allocation is more efficient than perfect competition. Competition, according to the theory, causes commercial firms to develop new products, services and technologies, which would give consumers greater selection and better products. The greater selection typically causes lower prices for the products, compared to what the price would be if there was no competition (monopoly) or little competition (oligopoly).

However, competition may also lead to wasted (duplicated) effort and to increased costs (and prices) in some circumstances. For example, the intense competition for the small number of top jobs in music and movie-acting leads many aspiring musicians and actors to make substantial investments in training which are not recouped, because only a fraction become successful. Critics have also argued that competition can be destabilizing, particularly competition between certain financial institutions.

Experts have also questioned the constructiveness of competition in profitability. It has been argued that competition-oriented objectives are counterproductive to raising revenues and profitability because they limit the options of strategies for firms as well as their ability to offer innovative responses to changes in the market. In addition, the strong desire to defeat rival firms with competitive prices has the strong possibility of causing price wars.

Another distinction appearing in economics is that between competition as an end-state – as in the case of both perfect and imperfect competition – and competition as a process. It is a process of rivalry between firms (or consumers) intensifying selective pressures for improvements. One can restate this as a process of discovery.

Three levels of end-state economic competition have been classified:

- The most narrow form is direct competition (also called "category competition" or "brand competition"), where products which perform the same function compete against each other. For example, one brand of pick-up trucks competes with several other brands of pick-up trucks. Sometimes, two companies are rivals and one adds new products to their line, which leads to the other company distributing the same new things, and in this manner they compete.
- The next form is substitute or indirect competition, where products which are close substitutes for one another compete. For example, butter competes with margarine, with mayonnaise and with other various sauces and spreads.
- The broadest form of competition is typically called budget competition. Included in this category is anything on which the consumer might want to spend their available money. For example, a family which has $20,000 available may choose to spend it on many different items, which can all be seen as competing with each other for the family's expenditure. This form of competition is also sometimes described as a competition of "share of wallet".

In addition, companies compete for financing on the capital markets (equity or debt) in order to generate the necessary cash for their operations. Investor typically consider alternative investment opportunities given their risk profile, and not only look at companies just competing on product (direct competitors). Enlarging the investment universe to include indirect competitors leads to a broader peer universe of comparable, indirectly competing companies.

Competition does not necessarily have to be between companies. For example, business writers sometimes refer to internal competition. This is competition within companies. The idea was first introduced by Alfred Sloan at General Motors in the 1920s. Sloan deliberately created areas of overlap between divisions of the company so that each division would compete with the other divisions. For example, the Chevrolet division would compete with the Pontiac division for some market segments. The competing brands by the same company allowed parts to be designed by one division and shared by several divisions, for example parts designed by Chevrolet would also be used by Pontiac. In 1931 Procter & Gamble initiated a deliberate system of internal brand-versus-brand rivalry. The company was organized around different brands, with each brand allocated resources, including a dedicated group of employees willing to champion the brand. Each brand manager was given responsibility for the success or failure of the brand, and compensated accordingly.

Most businesses also encourage competition between individual employees. An example of this is a contest between sales representatives. The sales representative with the highest sales (or the best improvement in sales) over a period of time would gain benefits from the employer. This is also known as intra-brand competition.

Shalev and Asbjornsen found that success (i.e. the saving resulted) of reverse auctions correlated most closely with competition. The literature widely supported the importance of competition as the primary driver of reverse auctions success. Their findings appear to support that argument, as competition correlated strongly with the reverse auction success, as well as with the number of bidders.

Business and economic competition in most countries is often limited or restricted. Competition often is subject to legal restrictions. For example, competition may be legally prohibited, as in the cases of a government monopoly or of a government-granted monopoly. Governments may institute tariffs, subsidies or other protectionist measures in order to prevent or reduce competition. Depending on the respective economic policy, pure competition is to a greater or lesser extent regulated by competition policy and competition law. Another component of these activities is the discovery process, with instances of higher government regulations typically leading to less competitive businesses being launched.

Nicholas Gruen has referred to The Competition Delusion, in which competition is taken to be unambiguously good, even where that competition leaks into the rules of the game. He claims this drives financialisation (the approximate doubling of proportion of economic resources dedicated to finance and to 'rule making and administering' professions such as law, accountancy and auditing.

=== Law ===
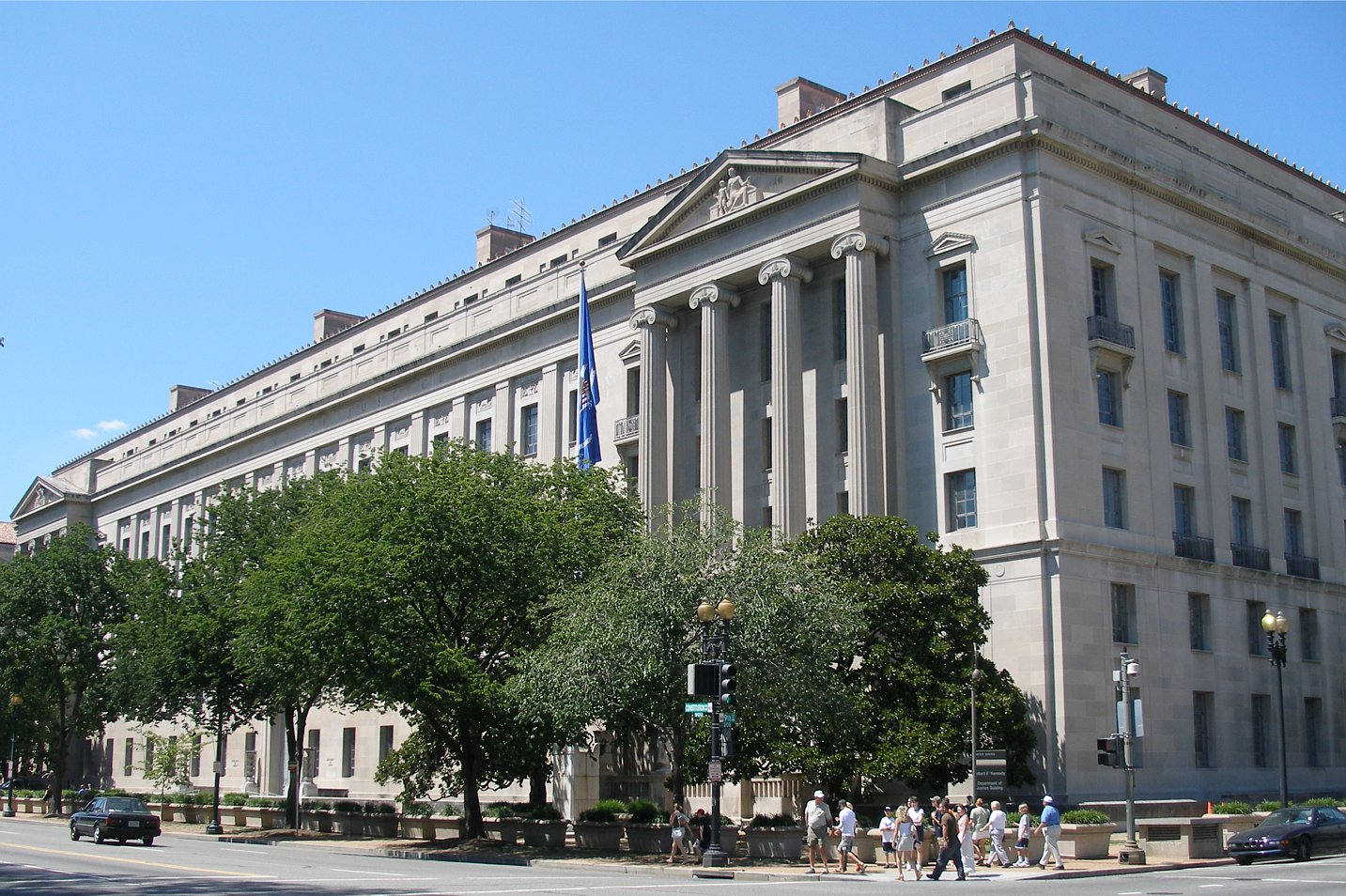
The Department of Justice building in Washington, D.C. houses the influential antitrust enforcers of U.S. competition laws.

Competition law, known in the United States as antitrust law, has three main functions:

- First, it prohibits agreements aimed to restrict free trading between business entities and their customers. For example, a cartel of sports shops who together fix football-jersey prices higher than normal is illegal.
- Second, competition law can ban the existence or abusive behaviour of a firm dominating the market. One case in point could be a software company who through its monopoly on computer platforms makes consumers use its media player.
- Third, to preserve competitive markets, the law supervises the mergers and acquisitions of very large corporations. Competition authorities could for instance require that a large packaging company give plastic bottle licenses to competitors before taking over a major PET producer.

In all three cases, competition law aims to protect the welfare of consumers by ensuring that each business must compete for its share of the market economy.

== Game theory ==
Game theory is "the study of mathematical models of conflict and cooperation between intelligent rational decision-makers." Game theory is mainly used in economics, political science, and psychology, as well as logic, computer science, biology and poker. Originally, it mainly addressed zero-sum games, in which one person's gains result in losses for the other participants.

Game theory is a major method used in mathematical economics and business for modeling competing behaviors of interacting agents. Applications include a wide array of economic phenomena and approaches, such as auctions, bargaining, mergers & acquisitions pricing, fair division, duopolies, oligopolies, social network formation, agent-based computational economics, general equilibrium, mechanism design, and voting systems; and across such broad areas as experimental economics, behavioral economics, information economics, industrial organization, and political economy.

This research usually focuses on particular sets of strategies known as "solution concepts" or "equilibria". A common assumption is that players act rationally. In non-cooperative games, the most famous of these is the Nash equilibrium. A set of strategies is a Nash equilibrium if each represents a best response to the other strategies. If all the players are playing the strategies in a Nash equilibrium, they have no unilateral incentive to deviate, since their strategy is the best they can do given what others are doing.

== Philosophy ==
Margaret Heffernan's study, A Bigger Prize, examines the perils and disadvantages of competition in (for example) biology, families, sport, education, commerce and the Soviet Union.

=== Marx ===
Karl Marx insisted that "the capitalist system fosters competition and egoism in all its members and thoroughly undermines all genuine forms of community". It promotes a "climate of competitive egoism and individualism", with competition for jobs and competition between employees; Marx said competition between workers exceeds that demonstrated by company owners. He also points out that competition separates individuals from one another and while concentration of workers and development of better communication alleviate this, they are not a decision.

=== Mahatma Gandhi ===
Gandhi speaks of egoistic competition. For him, such qualities glorified and/or left unbridled, can lead to violence, conflict, discord and destructiveness. For Gandhi, competition comes from the ego, and therefore society must be based on mutual love, cooperation and sacrifice for the well-being of humanity. In the society desired by Gandhi, each individual will cooperate and serve for the welfare of others and people will share each other's joys, sorrows and achievements as a norm of a social life. For him, in a non-violent society, competition does not have a place and this should become realized with more people making the personal choice to have fewer tendencies toward egoism and selfishness.

== See also ==
- Academic achievement
- Asymmetric competition
- Arms race
- Brinkmanship
- Competition regulator
- Competitor analysis
- Conflict theories
- Cooperation
- Dozens (game)
- Ecological model of competition
- Economic mobility
- Free market
- Gaming the system
- Identity performance
- Monopolistic competition
- Non-zero-sum game
- Opportunism
- Prisoner's dilemma
- Security dilemma
- Student competitions
- Social mobility
- Winning streak
- Win-win game
- Zero-sum
