= Dividing territories =

Dividing territories, market division or horizontal territorial allocation is an agreement by two companies to stay out of each other's way and reduce competition in the agreed-upon territories. The process known as geographic market allocation is one of several anti-competitive practices outlawed under United States antitrust laws. The term is generally understood to include dividing customers as well. The competitors who agree to this type of arrangement will often reject business from customers in another's territory. Territorial allocation scheme results in an absence of competition in prices and choice of products for the affected customers. Such agreements can be illegal under antitrust regulation.

For example, in 1984, FMC Corp. and Asahi Chemical agreed to divide territories for the sale of microcrystalline cellulose, and later FMC attempted to eliminate all vestiges of competition by inviting smaller rivals also to collude.

== See also ==
- Regional lockout
- Market allocation scheme
