= Tacit collusion =

Collusion between competitors

Tacit collusion is a collusion between competitors who do not explicitly exchange information but achieve an agreement about coordination of conduct. There are two types of tacit collusion: concerted action and conscious parallelism. In a concerted action, also known as concerted activity, competitors exchange some information without reaching any explicit agreement, while conscious parallelism implies no communication. In both types of tacit collusion, competitors agree to play a certain strategy without explicitly saying so. It is also called oligopolistic price coordination or tacit parallelism.

A dataset of gasoline prices of BP, Caltex, Woolworths, Coles, and Gull from Perth gathered in the years 2001 to 2015 was used to show by statistical analysis the tacit collusion between these retailers. BP emerged as a price leader and influenced the behavior of the competitors. As result, the timing of price jumps became coordinated and the margins started to grow in 2010.

== Conscious parallelism ==
In competition law, some sources use conscious parallelism as a synonym to tacit collusion in order to describe pricing strategies among competitors in an oligopoly that occurs without an actual agreement or at least without any evidence of an actual agreement between the players. In result, one competitor will take the lead in raising or lowering prices. The others will then follow suit, raising or lowering their prices by the same amount, with the understanding that greater profits result.

This practice can be harmful to consumers who, if the market power of the firm is used, can be forced to pay monopoly prices for goods that should be selling for only a little more than the cost of production. Nevertheless, it is very hard to prosecute because it may occur without any collusion between the competitors. Courts have held that no violation of the antitrust laws occurs where firms independently raise or lower prices, but that a violation can be shown when plus factors occur, such as firms being motivated to collude and taking actions against their own economic self-interests. This procedure of the courts is sometimes called as setting of a conspiracy theory.

Based on this interpretation, conscious parallelism is frequently analysed under antitrust economics as a behavioural pattern that results from the strategic interdependence of firms in oligopolistic markets. When there are a few large competitors in a particular market, each firm realises that its pricing choices are going to affect (and be affected by) the responses of the other firms. As a result, firms can change prices or output in similar directions without having explicit agreements, with the effect that they approach coordinated behaviour even though each firm is acting independently.

Economic theory suggests that such parallel behaviour can be the result of the fact that firms can anticipate the mutual harm that aggressive price competition will inflict on them all. In concentrated markets, the firms may thus have pricing strategies that keep their prices higher and more stable, since they look at how their competitors are doing and adjust their behaviour accordingly. This form of coordination does not necessarily involve any communication, but rather reflects the structural incentives generated by oligopolistic competition as well as the information that firms acquire by watching one another in the marketplace.

For the courts and competition authorities, the challenge is deciding what lawful competitive behaviour is and what is tacit collusion. Parallel pricing alone is not illegal, as the firms are allowed to monitor market conditions and adjust their moves in response to the moves made by their competitors. As a result, antitrust enforcement has frequently depended on the identification of other indicators (commonly referred to as "plus factors"). These may involve things that would be economically irrational in the absence of coordination or evidence of communication between firms or of market conditions that strongly encourage coordinated behaviour. The existence of such factors may assist the courts in deciding whether parallel behaviour involves independent decision-making or implicit collusion.

This issue has increasingly become a major issue in markets that are characterised by high levels of price transparency. Digital platforms and online marketplaces make it easier for firms to track the prices of their rivals almost instantly, allowing parallel moves to be more common and apparent. Scholars observe that the use of multisided platforms and data-driven pricing tools can reinforce such a dynamic, as firms would use real-time information to optimise their strategies without explicitly made agreements. For instance, large-scale digital ecosystems like Alibaba Group testify to how markets based on such platforms can be more transparent and responsive, and thereby set up conditions under which tacit coordination is more likely. These developments have spurred ongoing debate on how competing policy needs to evolve in ever more data-driven and digitally mediated market environments

== Price leadership ==
Oligopolists usually try not to engage in price cutting, excessive advertising or other forms of competition. Thus, there may be unwritten rules of collusive behavior such as price leadership. Price leadership is the form of a tacit collusion, whereby firms orient at the price set by a leader. A price leader will then emerge and set the general industry price, with other firms following suit. For example, see the case of British Salt Limited and New Cheshire Salt Works Limited.

Classical economic theory holds that Pareto efficiency is attained at a price equal to the incremental cost of producing additional units. Monopolies are able to extract optimum revenue by offering fewer units at a higher cost. An oligopoly where each firm acts independently tends toward equilibrium at the ideal, but such covert cooperation as price leadership tends toward higher profitability for all, though it is an unstable arrangement.

There exist two types of price leadership. In dominant firm price leadership, the price leader is the biggest firm. In barometric firm price leadership, the most reliable firm emerges as the best barometer of market conditions, or the firm could be the one with the lowest costs of production, leading other firms to follow suit. Although this firm might not be dominating the industry, its prices are believed to reflect market conditions which are the most satisfactory, as the firm would most likely be a good forecaster of economic changes.

== Auctions ==
In repeated auctions, bidders might participate in a tacit collusion to keep bids low. A profitable collusion is possible, if the number of bidders is finite and the identity of the winner is publicly observable. It can be very difficult or even impossible for the seller to detect such collusion from the distribution of bids only. In case of spectrum auctions, some sources claim that a tacit collusion is easily upset:

"It requires that all the bidders reach an implicit agreement about who should get what. With thirty diverse bidders unable to communicate about strategy except through their bids, forming such unanimous agreement is difficult at best."

Nevertheless, Federal Communications Commission (FCC) experimented with precautions for spectrum auctions like restricting visibility of bids, limiting the number of bids and anonymous bidding. So called click-box bidding used by governmental agencies in spectrum auctions restricts the number of valid bids and offers them as a list to a bidder to choose from. Click-box bidding was invented in 1997 by FCC to prevent bidders from signalling bidding information by embedding it into digits of the bids. Economic theory predicts a higher difficulty for tacit collusions due to those precautions. In general, transparency in auctions always increases the risk of a tacit collusion.

== Algorithms ==
Once the competitors are able to use algorithms to determine prices, a tacit collusion between them imposes a much higher danger. E-commerce is one of the major premises for algorithmic tacit collusion. Complex pricing algorithms are essential for the development of e-commerce. European Commissioner Margrethe Vestager mentioned an early example of algorithmic tacit collusion in her speech on "Algorithms and Collusion" on 16 March 2017, described as follows:

"A few years ago, two companies were selling a textbook called The Making of a Fly. One of those sellers used an algorithm which essentially matched its rival's price. That rival had an algorithm which always set a price 27% higher than the first. The result was that prices kept spiralling upwards, until finally someone noticed what was going on, and adjusted the price manually. By that time, the book was selling – or rather, not selling – for 23 million dollars a copy."

An OECD Competition Committee Roundtable "Algorithms and Collusion" took place in June 2017 in order to address the risk of possible anti-competitive behaviour by algorithms.

It is important to distinguish between simple algorithms intentionally programmed to raise price according to the competitors and more sophisticated self-learning AI algorithms with more general goals. Self-learning AI algorithms might form a tacit collusion without the knowledge of their human programmers as result of the task to determine optimal prices in any market situation.

== Duopoly example ==
Tacit collusion is best understood in the context of a duopoly and the concept of game theory (namely, Nash equilibrium). Let's take an example of two firms A and B, who both play an advertising game over an indefinite number of periods (effectively saying 'infinitely many'). Both of the firms' payoffs are contingent upon their own action, but more importantly the action of their competitor. They can choose to stay at the current level of advertising or choose a more aggressive advertising strategy. If either firm chooses low advertising while the other chooses high, then the low-advertising firm will suffer a great loss in market share while the other experiences a boost. If they both choose high advertising, then neither firms' market share will increase but their advertising costs will increase, thus lowering their profits. If they both choose to stay at the normal level of advertising, then sales will remain constant without the added advertising expense. Thus, both firms will experience a greater payoff if they both choose normal advertising (this set of actions is unstable, as both are tempted to defect to higher advertising to increase payoffs). A payoff matrix is presented with numbers given:

	Firm B normal advertising	Firm B aggressive advertising
Firm A normal advertising	Each earns $50 profit	Firm A: $0 profit Firm B: $80 profit
Firm A aggressive advertising	Firm A: $80 profit Firm B: $0 profit	Each earns $15 profit

Notice that Nash's equilibrium is set at both firms choosing an aggressive advertising strategy. This is to protect themselves against lost sales. This game is an example of a prisoner's dilemma.

In general, if the payoffs for colluding (normal, normal) are greater than the payoffs for cheating (aggressive, aggressive), then the two firms will want to collude (tacitly). Although this collusive arrangement is not an equilibrium in the one-shot game above, repeating the game allows the firms to sustain collusion over long time periods. This can be achieved, for example if each firm's strategy is to undertake normal advertising so long as its rival does likewise, and to pursue aggressive advertising forever as soon as its rival has used an aggressive advertising campaign at least once (see: grim trigger) (this threat is credible since symmetric use of aggressive advertising is a Nash equilibrium of each stage of the game). Each firm must then weigh the short term gain of $30 from 'cheating' against the long term loss of $35 in all future periods that comes as part of its punishment. Provided that firms care enough about the future, collusion is an equilibrium of this repeated game.

To be more precise, suppose that firms have a discount factor $\delta$. The discounted value of the cost to cheating and being punished indefinitely are

$$\sum_{t=1}^{\infty}\delta^t 35=\frac{\delta}{1-\delta}35$$.

The firms therefore prefer not to cheat (so that collusion is an equilibrium) if

$$30<\frac{\delta}{1-\delta}35\Leftrightarrow\delta>\frac{6}{13}$$.

== See also ==
- Accumulation by dispossession
- Competition law
- Cournot competition
- Laissez-faire Capitalism
- Nash equilibrium
- Price fixing cases
- Malicious compliance
- Monopoly
- Monopsony
- Predatory pricing
- Price leadership
- Oligopoly
- Whistleblower
