= Kinked demand =

Economic Model regarding demand

A kink in an otherwise linear demand curve. Note how marginal costs can fluctuate between MC1 and MC3 without the equilibrium quantity or price changing.

The Kinked-Demand curve theory is an economic theory regarding oligopoly and monopolistic competition. Kinked demand was an initial attempt to explain sticky prices.

== Theory ==
"Kinked" demand curves and traditional demand curves are similar in that they are both downward-sloping. They are distinguished by a hypothesized concave bend with a discontinuity at the bend - the "kink." Therefore, the first derivative point is undefined and leads to a jump discontinuity in the marginal revenue curve.

Classical economic theory assumes that a profit-maximizing producer with some market power (either due to oligopoly or monopolistic competition) will set marginal costs equal to marginal revenue. This idea can be envisioned graphically by the intersection of an upward-sloping marginal cost curve and a downward-sloping marginal revenue curve . In classical theory, any change in the marginal cost structure or the marginal revenue structure will be immediately reflected in a new price and/or quantity sold of the item. This result does not occur if a "kink" exists. Because of this jump discontinuity in the marginal revenue curve, marginal costs could change without necessarily changing the price or quantity.

== Formulation ==
Hall and Hitch's graphical illustration of kinked demand

The two seminal papers on kinked demand were written nearly simultaneously in 1939 on both sides of the Atlantic. Paul Sweezy of Harvard College published "Demand Under Conditions of Oligopoly." Sweezy argued that an ordinary demand curve does not apply to oligopoly markets and promotes a kinked demand curve.

From Queen's College in Oxford, Robert Lowe Hall and Charles J. Hitch wrote "Price Theory and Business Behavior," presenting similar ideas but including more rigorous empirical testing, including a business survey of 39 respondents in the manufacturing industry.

Hall and Hitch further present a hypothesis for the initial setting of prices; this explains why the "kink" in the curve is located where it is. They base this on a notion of "full cost" - marginal cost of each unit plus a percent of overhead costs or fixed costs with an additional percent added for profit. They emphasize the importance of industry tradition in history in determining this initial price, noting further, "An overwhelming majority of the entrepreneurs thought that a price based on full average cost…was the ‘right’ price, the one which ‘ought’ to be charged."

== Criticism ==
Others such as George Stigler have argued against kinked demand. His primary opposition is summarized in a Working Paper out of the Stanford University Economics Department by seminal authors Elmore, Kautz, Walls et al.

New classical economists, led by Chicago’s George Stigler, worked to discredit the kinked demand models. Stigler first argues that the kinked demand models are not useful, as Hall and Hitch’s model only explains observed phenomenon and is not predictive. He further explains that the kinked demand analysis only suggests why prices remain sticky and does not describe the mechanism that establishes the kink and how the kink can reform once prices change. Stigler also asserts that the model is unnecessary because Chicago theory already included allowances for short-run sticky prices due to collusion, menu costs, and regulatory or bureaucratic inefficiencies in markets.

== Contemporary reformulation ==
Game theory and models of strategic interaction have largely replaced kinked demand to explain price dislocations and slowly adjusting prices. For further information see:

=== Reading on contemporary applications ===
- A Duopoly Price Game
- A Theory of Dynamic Oligopoly, Price Competition, Kinked Demand Curves, and Edgeworth Cycles
- Competition in the Aluminium Industry 1945-58
- The Kinked Demand Curve: A Game-Theoretic Approach
