= Product differentiation =

Process of distinguishing unique products or services

In economics, strategic management and marketing, product differentiation (or simply "differentiation") is the process of distinguishing a product or service from others to make it more attractive to a particular target market. This involves differentiating it from competitors' products as well as from a firm's other products. The concept was proposed by Edward Chamberlin in his 1933 book, The Theory of Monopolistic Competition.

There are three types of product differentiation:

1. Horizontal differentiation: Based on a single product characteristic which is subjectively evaluated by consumers
2. Vertical differentiation: Based on a single product characteristic which can be objectively evaluated by consumers
3. Mixed differentiation: A combination of horizontal and vertical differentiation factors.

== Rationale ==
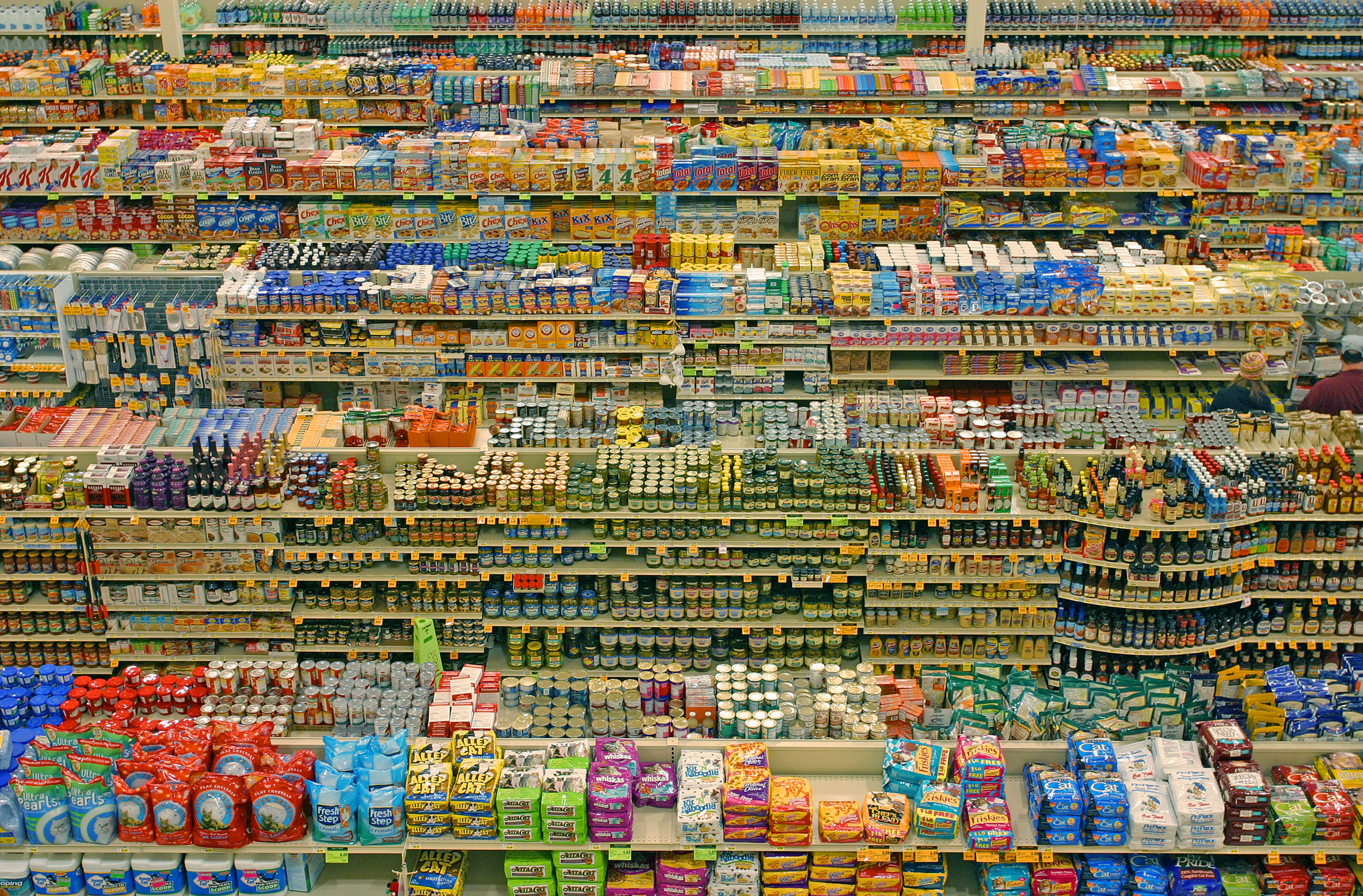
Aisles in a supermarket. While each item has the same intended purpose, competition has driven each brand to differentiate its own product from the others to encourage consumer preference.

Firms have different resource endowments that enable them to construct specific competitive advantages over competitors. Resource endowments allow firms to be different, which reduces competition and makes it possible to reach new segments of the market. Thus, differentiation is the process of distinguishing the differences of a product or offering from others, to make it more attractive to a particular target market.

Although research in a niche market may result in changing a product in order to improve differentiation, the changes themselves are not differentiation. Marketing or product differentiation is the process of describing the differences between products or services, or the resulting list of differences. This is done in order to demonstrate the unique aspects of a firm's product and create a sense of value. Marketing textbooks are firm on the point that any differentiation must be valued by buyers (a differentiation attempt that is not perceived does not count). The term unique selling proposition refers to advertising to communicate a product's differentiation.

In economics, successful product differentiation leads to competitive advantage and is inconsistent with the conditions for perfect competition, which include the requirement that the products of competing firms should be perfect substitutes.

The brand differences are mostly minor; they can be merely a difference in packaging or an advertising theme. The physical product need not change, but it may. Differentiation is due to buyers perceiving a difference; hence, causes of differentiation may be functional aspects of the product or service, how it is distributed and marketed, or who buys it. The major sources of product differentiation are as follows.

- Differences in quality which are usually accompanied by differences in price
- Differences in functional features or design
- Ignorance of buyers regarding the essential characteristics and qualities of goods they are purchasing
- Sales promotion activities of sellers and, in particular, advertising
- Differences in availability (e.g. timing and location).

The objective of differentiation is to develop a position that potential customers see as unique. The term is used frequently when dealing with freemium business models, in which businesses market a free and paid version of a given product. Given they target the same group of customers, it is imperative that free and paid versions be effectively differentiated.

Differentiation primarily affects performance through reducing directness of competition: as the product becomes more different, categorization becomes more difficult and hence draws fewer comparisons with its competition. A successful product differentiation strategy will move a product from competing based primarily on price to competing on non-price factors (such as product characteristics, distribution strategy, or promotional variables).

Most people would say that the implication of differentiation is the possibility of charging a price premium; however, this is an over-simplification. If customers value the firm's offer, they will be less sensitive to aspects of competing offers; price may not be one of these aspects. Differentiation leads customers in a given segment to have a lower sensitivity to other features (non-price) of the product.

== History ==
Edward Chamberlin’s (1933) seminal work on monopolistic competition mentioned the theory of differentiation, which maintained that for available products within the same industry, customers may have different preferences. However, a generic strategy of differentiation popularized by Michael Porter (1980) proposed that differentiation is any product (tangible or intangible) perceived as "being unique" by at least one set of customers. Hence, it depends on customers' perception of the extent of product differentiation. Even until 1999, the consequences of these concepts were not well understood. In fact, Miller (1986) proposed marketing and innovation as two differentiation strategies, which was supported by some scholars like Lee and Miller (1999). Mintzberg (1988) proposed more specific but broad categories: quality, design, support, image, price, and undifferentiated products, which received support from Kotha and Vadlamani (1995). However, IO literature (Ethiraj & Zhu, 2008; Makadok, 2010, 2011) did deeper analysis into the theory and explored a clear distinction between the wide use of vertical and horizontal differentiation.

== Types ==
=== Vertical product differentiation ===
Vertical product differentiation can be measured objectively by a consumer. For example, when comparing two similar products, the quality and price can clearly be identified and ranked by the customer. If both A and B products have the same price to the consumer, then the market share for each one will be positive, according to the Hotelling model. The major theory in this is that all consumers prefer the higher quality product if two distinct products are offered at the same price. A product can differ in many vertical attributes such as its operating speed. What really matters is the relationship between consumers' willingness to pay for improvements in quality and the increase in cost per unit that comes with such improvements. Therefore, the perceived difference in quality is different among different consumers, so it is objective. For example, a green product might have a lower or zero negative effect on the environment; however, it may turn out to be inferior to other products in other aspects. Hence, the product's appeal also depends on the way it is advertised and the social pressure felt by a potential consumer. Even one vertical differentiation can be a decisive factor in purchasing.

=== Horizontal product differentiation ===
Horizontal differentiation seeks to affect an individual's subjective decision-making, that is the difference cannot be measured in an objective way. For example, different color versions of the same iPhone or MacBook. A lemon ice cream is not superior to a chocolate ice cream, is completely based on the user's preference. A restaurant may price all of its desserts at the same price and lets the consumer freely choose its preferences since all the alternatives cost the same. A clear example of Horizontal Product Differentiation can be seen when comparing Coca Cola and Pepsi: if priced the same then individuals will differentiate between the two based purely on their own taste preference.

=== Other types of product differentiation ===
Whilst product differentiation is typically broken into these two types, all products exhibit a combination of both, and they are not the only way to define differentiation. Another way to differentiate a product is through spatial differentiation. Spatial product differentiation uses geographical location as a way to differentiate. An example of spatial differentiation is a firm locally sourcing inputs and producing their product.

== Substitute goods and product differentiation ==
According to research conducted by combining mathematics and economics, decisions of pricing depend on the substitutability between products, the level of substitutability varies as the degree of differentiation between firms’ products change. A firm cannot charge a higher price if products are good substitutes, conversely as a product deviates from others in the segment producers can begin to charge a higher price. The lower non-cooperative equilibrium price the lower the differentiation. For this reason, firms might jointly raise prices above the equilibrium or competitive level by coordination between themselves. They have a verbal or written collusion agreement between them. Firms operating in a market of low product differentiation might not coordinate with others, which increases the incentive to cheat the collusion agreement. If a firm slightly lowers there prices, they can capture a large fraction of the market and obtain short term profits if the products are highly substitutable.

== Implications of product differentiation ==
Product differentiation within a given market segment can have both positive and negative affects on the consumer. From the producers perspective building a different product compared to competitors can create a competitive advantage which can result in higher profits. Through differentiation consumers gain greater value from a product, however this leads to increased demand and market segmentation which can cause anti-competitive effects on price. From this perspective greater diversity leads to more choices which means each individual can purchase a product better suited to themselves, the negative to this is prices within the market segment tend to rise. The level of differentiation between goods can also affect demand. For example within grocery stores, if a category of goods is relatively no-differentiated then a high amount of assortment depth leads to less sales.

== Interaction between horizontal and vertical differentiation: an application to banking ==
During the 1990s, steps taken by government on deregulation and European integration persuaded banks to compete for deposits on many factors like deposit rates, accessibility and the quality of financial services.

In this example using the Hotelling model, one feature is of variety (location) and one feature of quality (remote access). Remote access using bank services via postal and telephonic services like arranging payment facilities and obtaining account information). In this model, banks cannot become vertically differentiated without negatively affecting horizontal differentiation between them.

Horizontal differentiation occurs with the location of bank's branch. Vertical differentiation, in this example, occurs whenever one bank offers remote access and the other does not. With remote access, it can spur a negative interaction between transportation rate and taste for quality: customers who have higher taste for remote access face a lower transportation rate.

A depositor with a high (low) taste for remote access has low (high) linear transportation costs. Different equilibria emerge as the result of two effects. On the one hand, introducing remote access steals depositors from your competitor because the product specification becomes more appealing (direct effect). On the other hand, banks become closer substitutes (indirect effect). First, banks become closer substitutes as the impact of linear transportation costs decreases. Second, deposit rate competition is affected by the size of the quality difference. These two effects, "stealing" depositors versus "substitutability" between banks, determines the equilibrium. For low and high values of the ratio quality difference to transportation rate, only one bank offers remote access (specialization). Intermediate (very low) values of the ratio quality difference to transportation costs yield universal (no) remote access.

This competition is a two factor game: one is of offering of remote access and the other is of deposit rates. Hypothetically, there will be two consequential scenarios if only one bank offers remote access. First, the bank gains a positive market share for all types of remote access, giving rise to horizontal dominance. This occurs when the transportation cost prevail over the quality of service, deposit rate and time. Second, vertical dominance comes into picture when the bank that is not offering remote access gets the entire market for depositors who have lowest preference for remote access. That is when the quality service, deposit rate and time prevails over the cost of transportation.

== See also ==
- Goldilocks principle
- Crippleware
- Non-price competition
- Marketing
- Mass customization
- Configurator
- Market segmentation
- Product management
- Brand
- Country of origin
- Marketing plan
- Freemium
- Positioning
- Price discrimination
- Hotelling's law
