= Donald F. Turner =

American attorney (1921–1994)

Assistant Attorney General for the Antitrust Division
- In office 1965–1968
- President: Lyndon B. Johnson
- Preceded by: William Horsley Orrick Jr.
- Succeeded by: Edwin Zimmerman

Personal details
- Born: March 19, 1921 Chippewa Falls, Wisconsin, U.S.
- Died: July 19, 1994 (aged 73) Derwood, Maryland, U.S.
- Party: Democratic Party
- Spouse: Joan Pearson
- Children: 2
- Education: Northwestern University (BA); Harvard University (PhD); Yale University (JD)

Donald Frank Turner (March 19, 1921 – July 19, 1994) was an American lawyer, economist, and legal scholar known for his expertise in United States antitrust law. He was a professor at Harvard Law School from 1954 to 1979 and served as the Assistant Attorney General in charge of the Antitrust Division of the U.S. Department of Justice from 1965 to 1968.

Turner's work in academia and in the government profoundly affected American antitrust law. Turner held a Ph.D. in economics from Harvard University and a Juris Doctor degree from Yale Law School, and he published influential papers applying economics to a wide variety of antitrust issues. As the federal government's chief antitrust enforcement officer, he attempted to ground all policy on economic foundations, disregarding populist or other political components on the ground that they could not be the basis for sound policy. He also tried to develop rules that would allow courts to apply economic principles in a way that recognized the nature of evidentiary proof and the limitations of judicial fact-finding. in his later academic career, together with Professor Phillip Areeda he published an influential paper on predatory pricing, developing the so-called Areeda-Turner rule, as well as a multi-volume treatise summarizing all of antitrust law, as explained by economic theory. "Few economists or lawyers have pursued as ambitiously as Donald Turner the effort to make antitrust more economically rational.

== Biography ==
=== Early life and education ===
Turner was born on March 19, 1921, the son of a Presbyterian minister. A native of Chippewa Falls, Wisconsin, Turner worked his way through Northwestern University where he received his undergraduate degree in 1941. He served as a lieutenant in the Navy during World War II, before he went on to earn a Ph.D. in economics from Harvard University in 1947. His thesis dealt with urban economics. He obtained a teaching position at Yale University where he taught economics while working on his J.D. degree from Yale Law School which he obtained in 1950. He clerked for Supreme Court Associate Justice Tom C. Clark (who had been Assistant Attorney General for Antitrust before his appointment to the Court), had a brief career in private law practice and then joined the Harvard Law School faculty in 1954.

=== Early academic work ===
At Harvard Turner's colleagues included the economists Edward Mason and Joe Bain, economists who pioneered the field of industrial organization. Turner was attracted to the work of Carl Kaysen, whose experience as a clerk of the district court judge who presided over the United Shoe Machinery case, an experience on which he based his Ph.D. thesis, and which convinced him of the need for economists to select cases to be prosecuted by government and frame the issues for the court.

Turner's collaboration with Kaysen expanding this approach produced Antitrust Policy: An Economic and Legal Analysis, described as "the most prominent antitrust treatise of the time." Together with the work of Joe Bain, the Kaysen-Turner book "ushered in the structure, conduct, performance (SCP) approach to industrial organization, with special emphasis on barriers to entry. While the so-called Chicago School under the neoclassical views of Aaron Director and his colleagues objected to antitrust enforcement based on the SPC paradigm (chiefly because they attributed a great deal of value to the presumed "efficiencies" of concentration), they nevertheless agreed with the "Harvard School" in conceiving economic actors for antitrust purposes as production entities and examined market conduct through price theory. This approach to antitrust enforcement would guide Turner's policies as head of the Antitrust Division.

=== Tenure as head of the Justice Department's Antitrust Division ===
Turner taught at Harvard Law School from 1954 to 1965, when he was appointed Assistant Attorney General, in which capacity he headed Antitrust Division at the United States Department of Justice under President Lyndon B. Johnson. President Johnson had an aversion to Harvard academics but was persuaded to appoint him after Clark Clifford, a close adviser to the President, provided the President with a review of Turner's antitrust philosophy and views. The decisive consideration for the President and Attorney General Nicholas Katzenbach was to calm concerns of business leaders, whose support they believed necessary for the Administration's prosecution of the Vietnam War, over language of recent Supreme Court decisions concerning the need to protect potential competition and small business. Turner, they felt, had the intellectual prestige and professional inclination to rationalize antitrust policy in a way that would reassure the business community.

Some observers believed on his appointment to lead the Antitrust Division that Turner would be more "lenient" than his predecessor, William Horsley Orrick Jr. Others noted his views in his 1959 volume on Antitrust Policy with Carl Kaysen that corporations should be broken up when they acquired "unreasonable market power." Katzenbach, together with Treasury Secretary Henry H. Fowler and Commerce Secretary John T. Connor tried to reassure business (without promising leniency) at the Spring Meeting of the Business Council. Katzenbach said that "the most that can be said is that the department proposes and the Supreme Court disposes." The current effort would be placed on developing guidelines "under which companies can more clearly tell in advance the mergers [which] might bring antitrust action." At his Senate confirmation hearing before the subcommittee on Antitrust, Turner was closely questioned by both proponents of stricter enforcement and those who wished to roll back enforcement. Senator Hart, chairman, question him on his view that "conglomerate" mergers (those not involving either competitors or firms in the same product supply line) should not be scrutinized as strictly as other mergers. On the other hand, Republican Senator Hruska questioned whether he believed "bigness" equaled "badness." Turner nonetheless was approved by the Judiciary Committee on June 22, 1965, and two days later was confirmed by the full Senate.

Turner's career in the Antitrust Division was noted for three characteristics. First, he attempted to articulate policy in a way that would give economic actors clear guidance. Second, he tried to ground that policy in sound academic research. Third, he limited antitrust policy to rules designed to enhance competition and not attempt to achieve broader social goals. His most long-lasting influence came about by creating the position of Special Economic Assistant, which he used to lure prominent academic economists for one year stints. His three appointments, William S. Comanor, Oliver E. Williamson and William G. Shepherd, all went on to noted academic careers. Turner was also aggressive in replacing old-line staff with extremely credentialed younger appointees. Shepherd said that the permanent staff called his upper-administration appointees the "Gold Coast."

In a telephone conversation on Wednesday 23 November 1966 with Attorney General Ramsey Clark, President Johnson stated his lack of confidence in Donald Turner.

=== Post-government career ===
After his term in government he returned to Harvard where he taught from 1968 until he retired in 1979 as Bassey Professor of Law. In 1976 Turner was awarded a Guggenheim Fellowship. It was during this period that he engaged in fruitful collaboration with fellow Harvard Law professor Phillip Areeda. The two authored numerous articles together as well as an ambitious multi-volume treatise on antitrust law. On retirement he became counsel to the Washington, D.C., law firm of Wilmer Cutler & Pickering. He also served as visiting professor at Georgetown University Law Center and was a fellow at the Brookings Institution.He has received an honorary doctorate from the University of Bath.

=== Death and tributes ===
He died on July 24, 1994, in Derwood, Maryland, from complications of Alzheimer's disease.

Upon his death, Associate Justice Stephen G. Breyer wrote the obituary on his legal career. Breyer wrote that Turner was Breyer's first post-clerkship employer.

== Legal contributions ==
Turner became prominent as the first legal scholar of antitrust to apply economic analysis to the Sherman Act and Clayton Acts. His analysis of the "Cellophane Case" against DuPont, published in The Harvard Law Review in 1956 was perhaps the first important illustration of the approach. The article was notable not only for its economic analysis but also its style, which was direct towards non-economists. He soon became an important voice on issues involving economic regulations of businesses. In 1956 he testified before the Senate Commerce Committee against two practices of the television networks, arguing that both were "clear" violations of antitrust laws: "option time" whereby affiliates were required to set aside certain time to air network programing and "must buy" where by CBS and NBC required advertisers to buy advertising time from at least 50 affiliates in order to get their sponsored program on the air.

In academic writings Turner tackled problems such as under what circumstances "tying" services could be a monopolization offense, how courts could distinguish "agreement" among competitors (under Section 1 of the Sherman Act) from responses to market forces, and under what circumstances the Clayton Act prohibited so-called "conglomerate Mergers" (i.e. mergers of companies not directly competing (horizontal) or in a chain of supply or distribution (vertical)). By the time he was appointed head of the Antitrust Division, he was considered "the nation's foremost academic expert in antitrust law, and his writings in the field are considered authoritative." Unlike advocates of a "populist" approach to antitrust enforcement (who condemned "bigness" as a problem not only for its effect on competition but also for the political power which large economic actors wielded), Turner tended to disregard the size of an economic actor and focused solely on the economic consequences of the actions. "He believed that competition, efficiency, and innovation should be the lodestars of antitrust policy, and that forestalling the undue exercise of market power should be its goal." In his first speech as Assistant Attorney General, he said: ""I do not believe it is proper under the law as it now is for the Department to attack mergers or other business conduct on the basis of considerations that have little or nothing to do with competition in the economic sense."

During his tenure he became known as a strong enforcer of the laws but attempted to make enforcement action predictable by, for example, publishing merger guidelines. They were designed to allow economic entities to continue natural growth, with the caveat that he often expressed that "substantial competitors cannot merge."

After his return to Harvard from government he teamed with Professor Areeda to author an important contribution to the jurisprudence of "attempt to monopolize" by predatory pricing under Section 2 of the Sherman Act. The goal was to develop a bright line test (which became known as the Areeda-Turner test) to separate illegal price cutting designed to drive a competitor from the market, which would harm consumers once the monopolist was free to raise prices in the future, from healthy price competition, which is inherently pro-competitive and beneficial to the consumer. The point their test settled on is when the price set is below short term average variable cost, which is a more easily ascertained substitute for marginal cost. By this measure, a court can determine when a monopolist is deliberately setting a price which does not profit-maximizing (except for the profits to be achieved once a competitor is forced from the market).

The latter part of his career at Harvard was spent in collaboration with Areeda producing their multi-volume treatise covering all of U.S. antitrust law.

== Family ==
Professor Turner married Joan Pearson in 1955. They had two children: Paul A. Turner and Katherine Turner.

== Selected publications ==
- Turner, Donald F., "The American Antitrust Laws," 18 Modern Law Review 244-258 (May 1955).
- Turner, Donald F., "Antitrust Policy and the Cellophane Case," 70 Harvard Law Review 281-318 (December 1956).
- Turner, Donald F., "The Validity of Tying Arrangements under the Antitrust Laws," 72 Harvard Law Review 50-75 (November 1958).
- Kaysen, Carl & Turner, Donald F., Antitrust Policy: An Economic and Legal Analysis (Cambridge, Massachusetts: Harvard University Press, 1959).
- Turner, Donald F. & Bok, Derek C., Economic Regulation: Cases and Materials (Cambridge, Massachusetts: Harvard Law School, 1962).
- Turner, Donald F., "The Definition of Agreement under the Sherman Act: Conscious Parallelism and Refusals to Deal," 75 Harvard Law Review 655-706 (February 1962).
- Turner, Donald F., "The Principles of American Anti-trust Laws" in Comparative Aspects of Anti-trust Law in the United States, the United Kingdom, and the European Economic Community (London: British Institute of International and Comparative Law, 1963), pp. 1–12.
- Turner, Donald F., "Conglomerate Mergers and Section 7 of the Clayton Act," 78 Harvard Law Review 1313-1395 (1965).
- Turner, Donald F., "Antitrust Enforcement Policy," 29 ABA Section of Antitrust Law 187-194 (1965).
- Turner, Donald F., "Patents, Antitrust and Innovation," 28 University of Pittsburgh Law Review 151-160 (December 1966).
- Turner, Donald F., "Comment on Galbraith's New Industrial State," 1 Antitrust Law & Economics Review 45-50 (Winter 1967).
- Turner, Donald F., "The Scope of Antitrust and Other Economic Regulatory Policies," 82 Harvard Law Review 1207-1244 (April 1969).
- Turner, Donal F., "The Patent System and Competitive Policy," 44 New York University Law Review 450-76 (May 1969).
- Areeda, Phillip E. & Turner, Donald F., "Predatory Pricing and Related Practices under Section 2 of the Sherman Act," 88 Harvard Law Review 697-733 (February 1975).
- Turner, Donald F.,The Scope of "Attempt to Monopolize" (New York: Association of the Bar of the City of New York, 1975).
- Areeda, Phillip E., Hovenkamp, Herbert & Turner, Donald F., Antitrust Law: An Analysis of Antitrust Principles and their Application (New York, NY: Aspen Law & Business, 1978-) (volumes gradually replaced by 2d edition beginning in 2000; currently there are 10 volumes and supplement with ongoing pocket parts).
- Areeda, Phillip E. & Turner, Donald F., "Williamson on Predatory Pricing," 87 Yale Law Journal 1337-1352 (June 1978).
- Turner, Donald F., "The Role of the 'Market Concept' in Antitrust Law," 49 Antitrust Law Journal 1145-1154 (March 1980).
- Turner, Donald F., "Observations on the New Merger Guidelines and the 1968 Merger Guidelines," 51 Antitrust Law Journal 307-315 (August 1982).
- Turner, Donald F., "Basic Principles in Formulating Antitrust and Misuse Constraints no the Exploitation of Intellectual Property Rights," 53 Antitrust Law Journal 485-502 (October 1984).
- Turner, Donald F., "Application of Competition Laws to Foreign Conduct: Appropriate Resolution of Jurisdictional Issues," 26 Swiss Review of International Competition Law 5-20 (1986).
- Turner, Donald F, "The Durability, Relevance, and Future of American Antitrust Policy," 75 California Law Review 797-815 (May 1987).
- Turner, Donald F., "The Virtues and Problems of Antitrust Laws," 35 Antitrust Bulletin 297-310 (Summer 1990).

== See also ==
- List of law clerks for the tenth seat of the Supreme Court of the United States
