= Industrial organization =

Field that examines the structure of firms and markets

Industrial organization or industrial economics is a field of economics that analyzes the structure and behavior of firms and imperfectly competitive market structures. It introduces real-world features that depart from the model of perfect competition, such as transaction costs, imperfect information, and barriers to entry faced by potential competitors.

The field studies how firms and markets are organized and how they behave across a spectrum ranging from competitive markets to monopoly, including cases shaped by government intervention and regulation.

Industrial organization combines theoretical models and empirical analysis to study issues such as market power, competition policy, oligopoly behavior, pricing strategies, vertical integration, and the design of contracts and institutions. It has applications in public policy, business strategy, and the regulation of industries.

There are different approaches to the subject. One approach is descriptive in providing an overview of industrial organization, such as measures of competition and the size-concentration of firms in an industry. A second approach uses microeconomic models to explain internal firm organization and market strategy, which includes internal research and development along with issues of internal reorganization and renewal. A third aspect is oriented to public policy related to economic regulation, antitrust law, and, more generally, the economic governance of law in defining property rights, enforcing contracts, and providing organizational infrastructure.

The extensive use of game theory in industrial economics has led to the export of this tool to other branches of microeconomics, such as behavioral economics and corporate finance. Industrial organization has also had significant practical impacts on antitrust law and competition policy.

The development of industrial organization as a separate field owes much to Edward Chamberlin, Joan Robinson, Edward S. Mason, J. M. Clark, Joe S. Bain and Paolo Sylos Labini, among others.

== History of the field ==
A 2009 book Pioneers of Industrial Organization traces the development of the field from Adam Smith to recent times and includes dozens of short biographies of major figures in Europe and North America who contributed to the growth and development of the discipline.

Frederic M. Scherer's research specialties include industrial economics and the economics of technological change, on which he has many much-cited publications, including many books and numerous articles. His 1971 textbook on Industrial Organization has gone through many editions, and Scherer still participated on the advisory board for the scholarly magazine of the same name. Scherer has also published recently concerning patent policy reform. Upon the death of Thomas McCraw, Scherer may be the scholar with the most expertise concerning the theories of former Harvard professor Joseph Schumpeter, about whom he has made a series of YouTube videos.

Other reviews by publication year and earliest available cited works those in 1970/1937, 1972/1933, 1974, 1987/1937-1956 (3 cites), 1968–9 (7 cites), 2009/c. 1900, and 2010/1951.

== Market structures ==
The common market structures studied in this field are: perfect competition, monopolistic competition, duopoly, oligopoly, oligopsony, monopoly and monopsony.

== Areas of study ==
Industrial organization investigates the outcomes of these market structures in environments with

- Price discrimination
- Product differentiation
- Durable goods
- Experience goods
- Collusion
- Signalling, such as warranties and advertising.
- Mergers and acquisitions
- Entry and Exit

== See also ==
- Bertrand competition
- Bertrand–Edgeworth model
- Competition policy
- Cournot competition
- Input–output model
- Important publications in industrial organization
- Structure–conduct–performance paradigm

== Journals ==
- The RAND Journal of Economics
- International Journal of the Economics of Business and issue preview links
- International Journal of Industrial Organization and issue-preview links
- Journal of Industrial Economics, Aims and Scope, and issue-preview links.
- Journal of Law, Economics, and Organization and issue-preview links.
- Review of Industrial Organization
