= Association for Social Economics =

The Association for Social Economics (ASE), founded in New York City in 1941, is a learned society in the broadly defined area of social economics, and is part of the Allied Social Science Associations. Social economics is the study of the ethical and social causes and consequences of economic behavior, institutions, organizations, theory, and policy. The fields of research promoted by ASE include the mutual relationships among ethics, social values, concepts of social justice, and the social dimensions of economic life.

The association was founded as the Catholic Economic Association (CEA) by American Jesuits Thomas Divine and Bernard William Dempsey (1903–1960), who received his PhD in economics from Harvard University in 1940, and was a student of Joseph A. Schumpeter. Dempsey published "Interest and Usury" in 1943. Divine published "Interest, an historical and analytical study in economics and modern ethics" in 1959. The first president was Thomas Divine and the first vice-president was Edward Chamberlin from Harvard University, mostly known for his work on monopolistic competition and on Chamberlinian monopolistic competition in particular.

The CEA was renamed the Association for Social Economics in 1970 in order to enrich the association's scope on ethics and social justice in economics with a more universal audience.
