= Chamberlinian monopolistic competition =

In Chamberlinian monopolistic competition every one of the firms have some monopoly power, but entry drives monopoly profits to zero. The concept gets its name from Edward Chamberlin.

== Background ==
One example where Chamberlinian monopolistic competition can be experienced is the book market. A publisher has a factual monopoly over certain titles via intellectual property rights. A book is an experience good and finding perfect legal substitutes on the market while the publisher's rights are in effect is impossible. This however doesn't lead to high monopoly profits on any particular titles while close substitutes are available. A best-seller cookbook for Asian cuisine still competes with other cookbooks about Asian cuisine as well as the whole cookbook genre.

Chamberlain's approach to monopoly theory is often compared to Joan Robinson's 1933 book The Economics of Imperfect Competition, where she coined the term "monopsony." Monopsony is used to describe the buyer converse of a seller monopoly. Monopsony is commonly applied to buyers of labour, where the employer has wage setting power that allows it to exercise Pigouvian exploitation and pay workers less than their marginal productivity. Robinson used monopsony to describe the wage gap between women and men workers of equal productivity.

== Historical Development ==
The intellectual roots of Chamberlin's theory predate his 1933 seminal work, The Theory of Monopolistic Competition. Many earlier economists questioned the relationship between monopolies and competitive markets. In his 1838 model Antoine Augustin Cournot analyzed the strategic elements of a duopoly, while Alfred Marshall examined the difficulties of increasing returns. From his 1929 article Piero Sraffa criticized Marshall's treatment of increasing returns and emphasized the use of a downward sloping demand curve under the assumption of imperfect substitutions. Harold Hotelling further expanded the theory with his model of spatial differentiation and transport costs which impacted firm choices. Chamberlin synthesized these works into a general theory in which firms have differentiated products, some monopolistic power, face free entry and exit, and where a group of firms is well defined and small relative to the economy. His framework became one of the most popular alternatives to the traditional models of competition and monopoly.
