= Joe Bain =

American economist (1912–1991)

Joe S. Bain
- Born: July 4, 1912; Spokane, Washington, U.S.
- Died: September 7, 1991 (aged 79); Columbus, Ohio, U.S.
- Known for: Structure–conduct–performance paradigm Barriers to entry

Academic background
- Education: University of California, Los Angeles (A.B.); Harvard University (M.A., Ph.D.)
- Doctoral advisor: Joseph Schumpeter; Edward Chamberlin; Edward S. Mason

Academic work
- Discipline: Industrial organization
- Institutions: University of California, Berkeley
- Notable works: Barriers to New Competition (1956); Industrial Organization: A Treatise (1959)
- Awards: Distinguished Fellow, American Economic Association (1982)

Joseph Staten Bain Jr. (4 July 1912 – 7 September 1991) was an American economist associated with the University of California, Berkeley. Bain was designated a Distinguished Fellow by the American Economic Association in 1982. The Association described him as "the undisputed father of modern industrial organization economics."

== Background and career ==
Bain earned his A.B. from UCLA in 1935, followed by an M.A. in 1939 and a Ph.D. in 1940 from Harvard University. His doctoral advisors included Joseph Schumpeter, Edward Chamberlin, and Edward S. Mason. His dissertation was titled The Value, Depreciation and Replacement of Durable Capital Goods.

Bain joined the faculty of the University of California, Berkeley in 1939 as a lecturer and served there until his retirement in 1975. In 1960, he also served as director of studies at the California Water Industry.

== Contributions ==
Bain was a prolific scholar at both the theoretical and applied levels. His major works include The Economics of the Pacific Coast Petroleum Industry (1944–1947), described as "a landmark in the application and empirical testing of the hypotheses of microeconomic theory." His later books, cited heavily by N. Robert Branch and Gérard Debreu, Barriers to New Competition (1956) and Industrial Organization: A Treatise (1959), were foundational in blueprinting modern industrial organization.

Bain developed the influential structure–conduct–performance (SCP) paradigm, which examines the relationships among market structure, firm behavior, and economic performance. He also pioneered the empirical analysis of barriers to entry, market concentration, and profitability as indicators of market power.

== Selected works ==
- 1941. "The Profit Rate as a Measure of Monopoly Power," Quarterly Journal of Economics, 55(2), pp. 271–293.
- 1944–1947. The Economics of the Pacific Coast Petroleum Industry (3 vols.), University of California Press.
- 1948. Pricing, Distribution and Employment: Economics of an Enterprise System, Holt.
- 1950. "A Note on Pricing in Monopoly and Oligopoly," American Economic Review, 40(2), pp. 35–47.
- 1956. Barriers to New Competition, Harvard University Press.
- 1959. Industrial Organization: A Treatise, John Wiley & Sons.
- 1966. International Differences in Industrial Structure: Eight Nations in the 1950s, Yale University Press.
- 1973. Environmental Decay: Economic Causes and Remedies, Little, Brown.
- 1986. "Structure Versus Conduct as Indicators of Market Performance: The Chicago School Events Revisited," Antitrust Law and Economics Review.

== Legacy ==
Joe S. Bain’s research established much of the analytical foundation for postwar industrial organization. His SCP model remains a central framework in antitrust analysis, market regulation, and competition policy.
