= Herbert Hovenkamp =

American antitrust law scholar

- Born: 1948 (age 77–78)
- Awards: John Sherman Award (2008)

Academic background
- Education: Calvin College (BA); University of Texas at Austin (MA, PhD, JD)

Academic work
- Institutions: University of Pennsylvania (2017–); University of Iowa (1985–2017)
- Main interests: Antitrust law

Herbert Hovenkamp (born 1948) is an American legal scholar known for his studies of U.S. antitrust law. He serves as James G. Dinan University Professor at the University of Pennsylvania Law School and the Wharton School, having previously been a professor at the University of Iowa College of Law for more than 30 years.

According to the New York Times, many consider Hovenkamp "the dean of American antitrust law." He is one of the two authors, along with the late Phillip Areeda, of the leading American antitrust law treatise, Antitrust Law, which is the most-cited antitrust legal authority in the United States.

== Biography ==
Hovenkamp was born in 1948. He graduated from Calvin College in 1969, then did graduate study at the University of Texas at Austin, receiving an M.A. in American literature in 1971 and a Ph.D. in American civilization in 1976. He also attended the University of Texas School of Law, receiving a Juris Doctor degree in 1978.

Hovenkamp was a law professor at the University of California Hastings College of Law (now University of California College of the Law, San Francisco) from 1980 to 1985 and at the University of Iowa College of Law from 1985 to 2017. Hovenkamp is a member of the American Academy of Arts and Sciences.

== Antitrust scholarship ==
Hovenkamp has been called "the most influential antitrust scholar of our generation" and the New York Times reported that many consider him "the dean of American antitrust law." Along with the late Phillip Areeda, Hovenkamp is one of the two authors of Antitrust Law, a widely cited American antitrust law treatise. The Areeda and Hovenkamp treatise is the single most-cited antitrust legal authority.

In each of the last ten antitrust cases heard by the United States Supreme Court, either the petitioner or the solicitor general pointed to Hovenkamp as supporting the position the justices were being urged to take. Professor Hovenkamp’s writings have been cited in 36 Supreme Court decisions and more than 1300 decisions in the lower courts.

Thomas Hungar, deputy solicitor general of the United States from 2003 to 2008, has called Hovenkamp one of the prime shapers of antitrust legal interpretation by U.S. courts.

In 2008, Hovenkamp received the John Sherman Award from the Antitrust Division of the Department of Justice. The award is presented approximately once every three years to "a person or persons for their outstanding achievement in antitrust law, contributing to the protection of American consumers and to the preservation of economic liberty."

== Selected works ==
=== Books ===
- Hovenkamp, Herbert (1991). Enterprise and American Law, 1836-1937. Cambridge, MA: Harvard University Press. ISBN 978-0674257481.
- —; Areeda, Phillip (2000). Antitrust Law: An Analysis of Antitrust Principles and Their Application (2nd ed.). New York: Wolters Kluwer. 3rd edition (2006); 4th edition (2013); 5th edition (2020).
- — (2008). The Antitrust Enterprise: Principle and Execution. Cambridge, MA: Harvard University Press. ISBN 978-0674027411.
- — (2015). The Opening of American Law: Neoclassical Legal Thought, 1870–1970. New York, London: Oxford University Press. ISBN 978-0199331307.
- — (2024). Federal Antitrust Policy: The Law of Competition and Its Practice (7th ed.). St. Paul: West Academic Publishing. ISBN 979-8887864860.

=== Articles ===
- Hovenkamp, Herbert (1985). "Antitrust Policy After Chicago". Michigan Law Review. 84 (2): 213–84. JSTOR 1289065. Archived from the original on October 6, 2017.
- — (1988). "The Classical Corporation in American Legal Thought". Georgetown Law Journal. 76 (5): 1593–1690. Archived from the original on November 8, 2017.
- — (1988). "Regulatory Conflict in the Gilded Age: Federalism and the Railroad Problem". Yale Law Journal. 97 (6): 1017–72. hdl:20.500.13051/16545. JSTOR 796340.
- — (1988). "The Political Economy of Substantive Due Process". Stanford Law Review. 40 (2): 379–448. JSTOR 1228820. Archived from the original on September 26, 2023.
- — (1989). "Antitrust's Protected Classes". Michigan Law Review. 88 (1): 1–47. JSTOR 1289134.
- — (1990). "The First Great Law & Economics Movement". Stanford Law Review. 42 (4): 993–1058. JSTOR 1228909. Archived from the original on October 7, 2017.
- — (1990). "Legislation, Well-Being, and Public Choice". University of Chicago Law Review. 57 (1): 63–116. JSTOR 1599873.
- — (1996). "Judicial Restraint and Constitutional Federalism: The Supreme Court's Lopez and Seminole Tribe Decisions". Columbia Law Review. 96 (8): 2213–48. JSTOR 1123420. Archived from the original on November 8, 2017.
- — (2001). "Post-Chicago Antitrust: A Review and Critique". Columbia Business Law Review. 2001 (2): 257–338. Archived from the original on September 29, 2023.
- —; Janis, Mark; Lemley, Mark A. (2003). "Anticompetitive Settlements of Intellectual Property Disputes". Minnesota Law Review. 87 (6): 1719–66. Archived from the original on October 7, 2017.
- —; Shapiro, Carl (2018). "Horizontal Mergers, Market Structures, and Burdens of Proof". Yale Law Journal. 127 (7): 1996–2025. JSTOR 45222590.
- —; Morton, Fiona Scott (2018). "Horizontal Shareholding and Antitrust Policy". Yale Law Journal. 127 (7): 2026–47. JSTOR 45222591.
- — (2018). "The Rule of Reason". Florida Law Review. 70 (1): 81–168.
- — (2021). "Antitrust and Platform Monopoly". Yale Law Journal. 130 (8): 1952–2051.
