= Dixit =

Dixit may refer to:

- Ipse dixit, a Latin phrase used to identify and describe a sort of arbitrary dogmatic statement
- Dixit (board game)
- Dixit Dominus, or Psalm 110, from the Book of Psalms
  - Dixit Dominus (Handel), a 1707 setting of that psalm by George Frideric Handel
- Dixit–Stiglitz model, model of monopolistic competition
- Dikshit or Dixit, an Indian family name
