= Monopolistic competition in international trade =

Imperfect competition of differentiated products that are not perfect substitutes

Monopolistic competition models are used under the rubric of imperfect competition in International Economics. This model is a derivative of the monopolistic competition model that is part of basic economics. Here, it is tailored to international trade.

== Setting up the model ==
Monopolies are not often found in practice. The more usual market format is oligopoly: several firms, each of which is large enough so that a change in their price will affect the other firms' price, except for those with monopolies. When looking at oligopolies, the problem of interdependence arises. Interdependence means that the firms will when setting their prices, consider the effect this price will have on the actions of both consumers and competitors. For their part, the competitors will consider their expectations of the firm's response to any action they may take in return. Thus, there is a complex game with each side "trying to second guess each others' strategies." The Monopolistic Competition model is used because its simplicity allows the examination of one type of oligopoly while avoiding the issue of interdependence.

== Benefits of the model ==
The appeal of this model is not its closeness to the real world but its simplicity. What this model accomplishes most is that it shows us the benefits to trade presented by economies of scale.

== Assumptions of the model ==
- 1. Each firm is presumed to be able to differentiate its product from that of its rivals. Cars are a good example here; they are very different yet in direct competition with each other. This means there will be some customer loyalty, which allows for some flexibility for the firm to move to a higher price. In other words, not all of a firm's customers would leave for other products if the firm raised its prices.
- 2. This model dismisses the issue of interdependence when a firm sets its price. The firm will act as if it were a monopoly regarding the price it sets, not considering the potential responses from its competitors. The justification is that there are numerous firms in the market, so each receives only scant attention from the others.

=== Background of the model ===
- An industry consisting of a number of firms, each of which produces differentiated products. The firms are monopolists for their products but depend somewhat on the number of reasonable alternatives available and the price of those alternatives. Each firm within the industry thus faces a demand that is affected by the price and prevalence of reasonable alternatives.
- Generally, we expect a firm's sales to increase the stronger the total demand for the industry's product as a whole. Conversely, we expect the firm to sell less if there are a significant number of firms in the industry and/or the higher the firm's price in relation to those competitors. The demand equation for such a firm would be:

$Q=S\times \left[\frac{1}{n} - b\left(P_{firm} - \bar{P}_{comp}\right)\right]$

Q = S x [1/n - b x (P - P)]

- "Q" = the firm's sales. "S" is the total sales of the industry. "n" is the number of firms in the industry, and "b" is a constant term representing the responsiveness of a firm's sales to its price. "P_{firm}" is the price charged by the firm itself. "P_{comp}" is the average price charged by its competitors.
- The intuition of this model is:

- If all firms charge the same price, their respective market share will be 1/n. Firms charging more get less, and firms charging less get more.

- (Note) Assume that lower prices will not bring new consumers into the market. In this model, consumers can only be gained at the expense of other firms. This simplifies things, allowing a focus on the competition among firms and also allows the assumption that if S represents the market size, and the firms are charging the same price, the market share of each firm will be S/n.
