= Phillip Nelson =

Economics scholar (born 1929)

Phillip Jacob Nelson (born 1929) is an emeritus professor at Binghamton University, where he was Bartle Professor of Economics. He is noted for having been the first to observe the distinction between an experience good and a search good.

Nelson obtained his doctorate in 1957 from Columbia University, with a dissertation titled "A Study in the Geographic Mobility of Labor".

== Selected publications ==
Research articles

- Nelson, P. (1970), "Information and Consumer Behavior", Journal of Political Economy, 78 (2): 311–329, doi:10.1086/259630, JSTOR 1830691, S2CID 155053131
- Nelson, P. (1974), "Advertising as Information", Journal of Political Economy, 82 (2): 729–754, CiteSeerX 10.1.1.124.8019, doi:10.1086/260231, JSTOR 1837143, S2CID 154829661

Books

- Nelson, Phillip J.; Greene, Kenneth V. (2003), Signaling Goodness: Social Rules and Public Choice, University of Michigan Press, ISBN 9780472113477.
