= Edward S. Mason =

American economist

Edward Sagendorph Mason
- Born: February 22, 1899; Clinton, Iowa, U.S.
- Died: February 29, 1992 (aged 93); Santa Barbara, California, U.S.
- Education: University of Kansas; Harvard University
- Occupation: Economist
- Spouse: Marguerite Sisson La Monte
- Children: 2 sons, 1 daughter

Edward Sagendorph Mason (February 22, 1899 – February 29, 1992) was an American economist and professor at Harvard University. He was the Dean of the Graduate School of Public Administration, now known as the John F. Kennedy School of Government, from 1947 to 1958. He was the president of the American Economic Association in 1962.

== Early life ==
Edward Sagendorph Mason was born on February 22, 1899, in Clinton, Iowa. His younger brother was Warren P. Mason, who became an electrical engineer and physicist. He graduated from the University of Kansas in 1919. He entered Harvard University, where he was a Rhodes scholar at the University of Oxford during his master's degree. He earned a PhD in economics from Harvard University in 1925. His thesis supervisor was Frank William Taussig.

== Career ==
Mason taught a course on the history of socialism in the Department of Economics at his alma mater, Harvard University, in the 1920s and 1930s. He was elected to the American Academy of Arts and Sciences in 1933. He became a tenured professor in 1936. In 1954, he was elected to the American Philosophical Society. He was the dean of the Graduate School of Public Administration, now known as the John F. Kennedy School of Government, from 1947 to 1958. He was the founder of the Development Advisory Service, now known as the Harvard Institute for International Development, in 1963.

Mason worked for the Office of Strategic Services during World War II. He was an early economist at the United Nations and the Marshall Plan. He was also a consultant to the World Bank.

Mason was the president of the American Economic Association in 1962. He became known for his work in industrial organization, an area in which provided direct inspiration to Joe Bain for his SCP model, and in development economics.

== Personal life and death ==
Mason married Marguerite Sisson La Monte on April 4, 1930. They had two sons and a daughter.

Mason died on February 29, 1992, in Santa Barbara, California.

== Selected works ==
- Mason, E. (1926) The doctrine of comparative cost. Quarterly Journal of Economics 41, November 63–93. JSTOR 1885553
- Edward S. Mason; Robert E. Asher (1 December 2010). The World Bank since Bretton Woods. Brookings Institution Press. ISBN 978-0-8157-2030-0.
