= Market structure =

Differentiation of firms by goods and operations

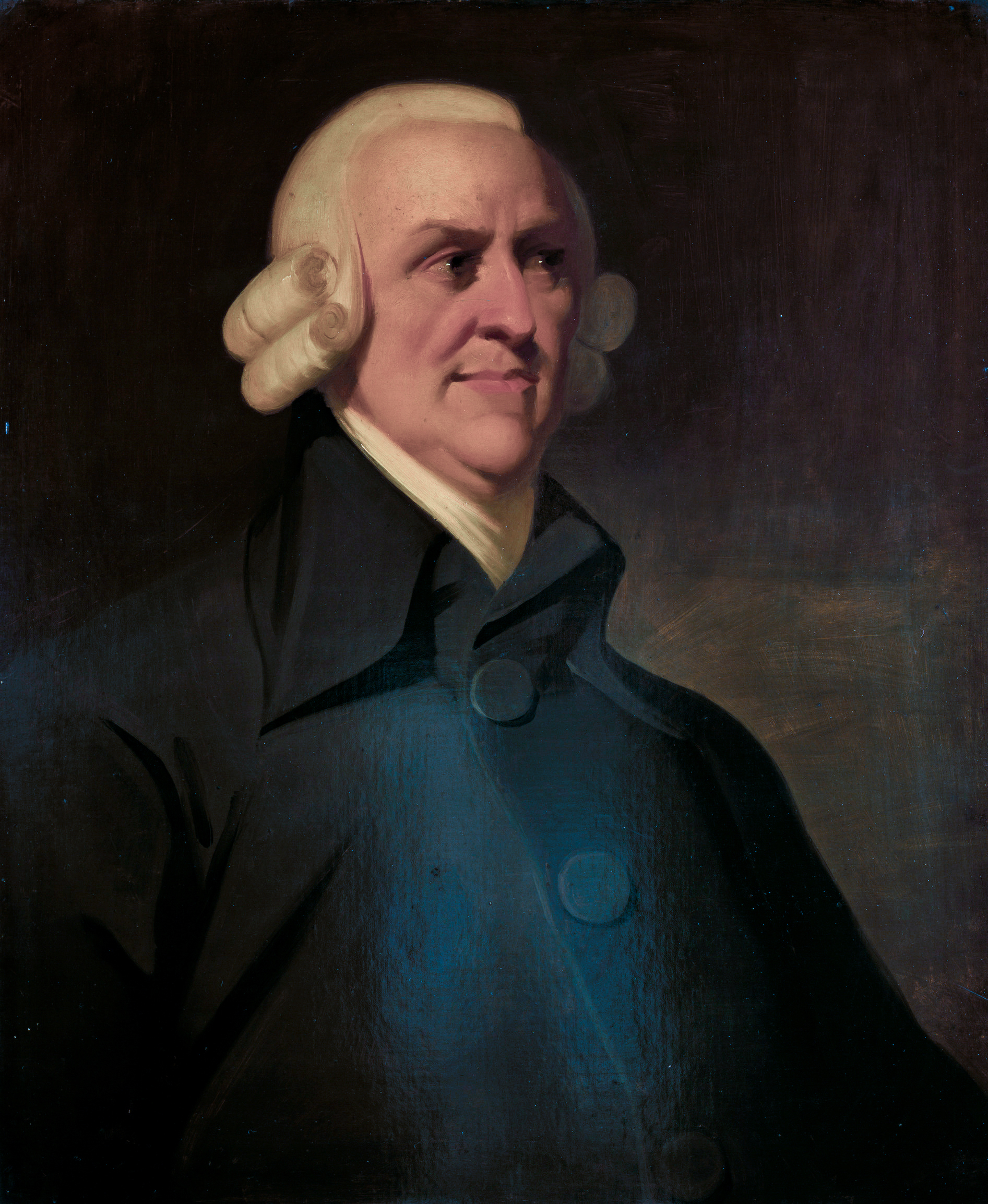
Adam Smith

Market structure, in economics, depicts how firms are differentiated and categorised based on the types of goods they sell (homogeneous/heterogeneous) and how their operations are affected by external factors and elements. Market structure makes it easier to understand the characteristics of diverse markets.

The main body of the market is composed of suppliers and demanders. Both parties are equal and indispensable. The market structure determines the price formation method of the market. Suppliers and Demanders (sellers and buyers) will aim to find a price that both parties can accept creating an equilibrium quantity.

Market definition is an important issue for regulators facing changes in market structure, which needs to be determined. The relationship between buyers and sellers as the main body of the market includes three situations: the relationship between sellers (enterprises and enterprises), the relationship between buyers (enterprises or consumers) and the relationship between buyers and sellers. The relationship between the buyer and seller of the market and the buyer and seller entering the market. These relationships are the market competition and monopoly relationships reflected in economics.

== History ==
Market structure has been a topic of discussion for many economists like Adam Smith and Karl Marx, who have strong conflicting viewpoints on how the market operates in presence of political influence. Adam Smith, in his writing on economics stressed the importance of laissez-faire principles outlining the operation of the market in the absence of dominant political mechanisms of control, while Karl Marx discussed the working of the market in the presence of a controlled economy sometimes referred to as a command economy in the literature. Both types of market structure have been in historical evidence throughout the twentieth century and twenty-first century.

Market structure has been apparent throughout history due to its natural influence it has on markets, this can be based on the different contributing factors that market up each type of market structure.

== Types ==
Based on the factors that decide the structure of the market, the main forms of market structure are as follows:

- Perfect competition refers to a type of market where there are many buyers and sellers that feature free barriers to entry, dealing with homogeneous products with no differentiation, where the price is fixed by the market. Individual firms are price takers as the price is set by the industry as a whole. Example: Agricultural products which have many buyers and sellers, selling homogeneous goods where the price is determined by the demand and supply of the market and not individual firms. In the short run, a firm in a perfectly competitive market may gain profits or loss, but in the long run, due to the entry and exit of new firms, price will equal the lowest point of average total cost (ATC).
  - Imperfect Competition refers to markets where standards for perfect competition (such as no barriers for entry and exit, homogeneous products and many buyers and sellers) are not fulfilled. All other types of competition come under imperfect competition.
- Monopolistic competition, a type of imperfect competition where there are many sellers, selling products that are closely related but differentiated from one another (e.g. quality of products may differentiate) and hence they are not perfect substitutes. This market structure exists when there are multiple sellers who attempt to seem different from one another. Examples: toothpaste, soft drinks, clothing as they are all heterogeneous products with many buyers and sellers, no to low entry barriers but are different from each other due to quality, taste, or branding. Firms have partial control over the price as they are not price takers (due to differentiated products) or Price Makers (as there are many buyers and sellers).
- Oligopoly refers to a market structure where only a small number of firms operate together control the majority of the market share. Firms are neither price takers or makers. Firms tend to avoid price wars by following price rigidity. They closely monitor the prices of their competitors and change prices accordingly. Oligopoly firms focus on quality and efficiency of their products to compete with other firms. Example: Network providers ( Entry barriers, Small number of sellers, many buyers, products can be homogeneous or differentiated). Three types of oligopoly. Due to the hallmark of oligopoly being the presence of strategic interactions among rival firms, the optimal business strategy of an enterprise can be studied through the thought of game theory. Under the logic of game theory, enterprises in oligopoly market have interdependent behavior. These actions are non-cooperative, each company is making decisions that maximize its own profits, and equilibrium is reached when all businesses are doing their best, taking into account the actions of their competitors.
  - Duopoly, a case of an oligopoly where two firms operate and have power over the market. Example: Aircraft manufactures: Boeing and Airbus. A duopoly in theory could have the same effect as a monopoly on pricing within a market if they were to collude on prices and or output of goods.
  - Oligopsony, a market where many sellers can be present but meet only a few buyers. Example: Cocoa producers
  - Cournot quantity competition, one of the first models of oligopoly markets was developed by Augustin Cournot in 1835. In Cournot's model, there are two firms and each firm selects a quantity to produce, and the resulting total output determines the market price.
  - Bertrand Price Competition, Joseph Bertrand was the first to analyze this model in 1883. In Bertrand's model, there are two firms and each firm selects a price to maximize its own profits, given the price that it believes the other firm will select.
- Monopoly, where there is only one seller of a product or service which has no substitute. The firm is the price maker as they have control over the industry. There are high barriers to entry, which an incumbent would conduct entry-deterring strategies of keeping out entrants reaping additional profits for the company. Frank Fisher, a noticed antitrust economist has described monopoly power as "the ability to act in an unconstrained way," such as increasing price or reducing quality. Example: Standard Oil (1870–1911)Under monopoly, monopoly firms can obtain excess profits through differential prices. According to the degree of price difference, price discrimination can be divided into three levels.
  - Natural monopoly, a monopoly in which economies of scale cause efficiency to increase continuously with the size of the firm. A firm is a natural monopoly if it is able to serve the entire market demand at a lower cost than any combination of two or more smaller, more specialized firms.
  - Or natural obstacles, such as the sole ownership of natural resources, De Beers was a monopoly in the diamond industry for years.
  - Monopsony, when there is only a single buyer in a market. Discussion of monopsony power in the labor literature largely focused on the pure monopsony model in which a single firm comprised the entirety of demand for labor in a market (e.g., company town).

== Features of market structures ==
The imperfectly competitive structure is quite identical to the realistic market conditions where some monopolistic competitors, monopolists, oligopolists, and duopolists exist and dominate the market conditions. The elements of Market Structure include the number and size of sellers, entry and exit barriers, nature of product, price, selling costs. Market structure can alter based on the new external factors, such as technology, consumer preferences and new entrants. Therefore, elements of Market Structure always stay the same but the importance of a single element may change making it more influential on the current structure.

Competition is useful because it reveals actual customer demand and induces the seller (operator) to provide service quality levels and price levels that buyers (customers) want, typically subject to the seller's financial need to cover its costs. In other words, competition can align the seller's interests with the buyer's interests and can cause the seller to reveal his true costs and other private information. In the absence of perfect competition, three basic approaches can be adopted to deal with problems related to the control of market power and an asymmetry between the government and the operator with respect to objectives and information: (a) subjecting the operator to competitive pressures, (b) gathering information on the operator and the market, and (c) applying incentive regulation.

Quick Reference to Basic Market Structures
Market Structure	Seller Entry & Exit Barriers	Nature of product	Number of sellers	Number of buyers	Price
Perfect Competition	No	Homogeneous	Many	Many	Uniform price as their price takers
Monopolistic competition	No	Closely related but differentiated	Many	Many	Partial control over price
Monopoly	Yes	Differentiated (No Substitute)	One	Many	Price Maker
Duopoly	Yes	Homogeneous or Differentiated	Two	Many	Price rigidity due to price war
Oligopoly	Yes	Homogeneous or Differentiated	Few	Many	Price rigidity due to price war
Monopsony	No	Homogeneous or Differentiated	Many	One	Price taker (as there is only one buyer)
Oligopsony	No	Homogeneous or Differentiated	Many	Few	Price Taker

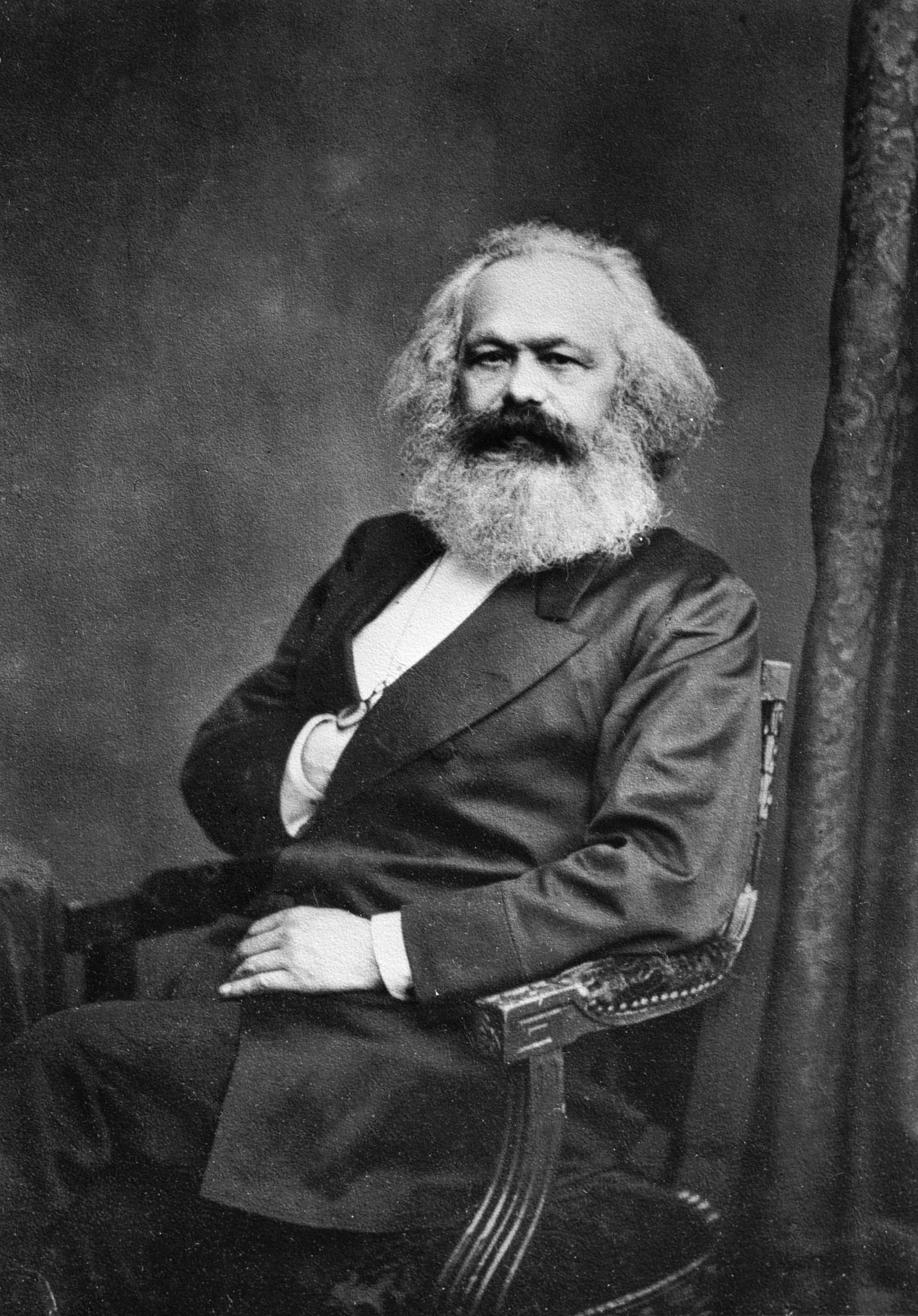
Karl Marx

The correct sequence of the market structure from most to least competitive is perfect competition, imperfect competition, oligopoly, and pure monopoly.

The main criteria by which one can distinguish between different market structures are: the number and size of firms and consumers in the market, the type of goods and services being traded, and the degree to which information can flow freely. In today's time, Karl Marx's theory about political influence on market makes sense as firms and industry are affected strongly by the regulation, taxes, tariffs, patents imposed by the government. These affect the barriers to entry and exit for the firms in the market.

=== Perfect competition ===
1. There are many buyers and sellers in the market, and there is no fixed buying and selling relationship between them.
2. The products or services traded in the market are all the same without any difference.
3. There are no barriers to entry and exit from the market.
4. There are no trade secrets.
5. Capital resources and labour are easily transferable.

=== Monopolistic Competition ===
There are a large number of enterprises, there are no restrictions on entering and exiting the market, and they sell different products of the same kind, and enterprises have a certain ability to control prices. Monopolies have complete market control as the barriers to entry are high and the threat of new entrants is low; therefore they can price set to their preference.

=== Oligopoly ===
The number of enterprises is small, entry and exit from the market are restricted, product attributes are different, and the demand curve is downward sloping and relatively inelastic. Oligopolies are usually found in industries in which initial capital requirements are high and existing companies have strong foothold in market share.

=== Monopoly ===
The number of enterprises is only one, access is restricted or completely blocked, and the products produced and sold are unique and cannot be replaced by other products. The company has strong control and influence over the price of the entire market.

Different market structures will also lead to different levels of social welfare. Generally speaking, as the degree of competition increases, the total social welfare measured by producer surplus plus consumer surplus will rise. The total surplus of perfect competition market is the highest. And the total surplus of imperfect competition market is lower. In the monopoly market, if the monopoly firm can adopt first-level price discrimination, the consumer surplus is zero and the monopoly firm obtains all the benefits in the market.

== Importance of Market Structure ==
Market structure is important for a firms use as it motivations, decision making, opportunities. This will incur changes to current market standings affecting: market outcomes, price, availability and variety.

Market structure provides indication on potential opportunities and threats which can influence business to adapt there processes and operations in order to meet market structure requirements in order to stay competitive. For example being able to understand market structure will help to identify any product substitutability a foundation element of market structure analysis to then determine the best course of action.

== Measure of market structure ==
- The N-firm concentration ratio is a common measure of market structure. This gives the combined market share of the N largest firms in the market. For example, if the 5-firm concentration ratio in the United States smart phone industry is about 0.8, which indicates that the combined market share of the five largest smart phone sellers in the United states is about 80 percent.
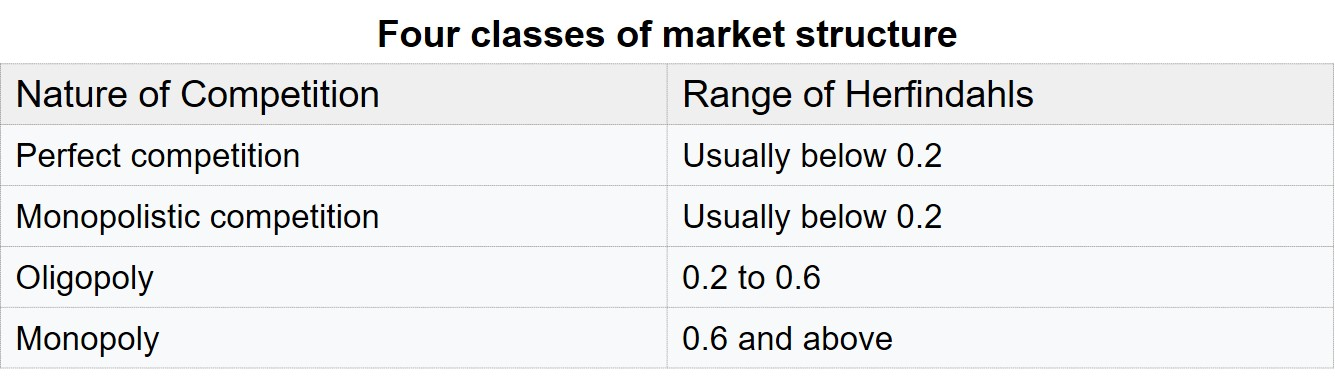
- Herfindahls index and types of market structure
  The Herfindahl index is defined as the sum of the squared market shares of all the firms in the market. Increases in the Herfindahl index generally indicate a decrease in competition and an increase of market power, vice versal. Generally, the Herfindahl index conveys more information than the N-firm concentration ratio. In general, this index can also measure the market concentration of the top n companies, and the impact of corporate mergers and acquisitions on the market structure. Although any relationship between Herfindahl index and concentration ratio can only provide a rough approximation, the estimation (prediction) of Herfindahl index becomes rapidly more accurate when given some of the largest market shares.

Besides market structure, many factors contribute to conduct and market performance. Market pressures are similarly evolving therefore when decision making based on market performance it is essential to assess all the circumstances affecting competition rather than rely solely on measures of market structure. Using a single measurement of market share can be misleading or inconclusive as only indicators are taken into account.

Different aspects that have been taken into account to measures the innovative advantage within particular market structures are: the size distribution of firms, the existence of certain barriers to entry, and the stage of industry in the product lifecycle. Creating another measure to determine the current market structure that can be used as evidence or to evaluate current market performance thus it can be used to forecast and determine future trends.

== See also ==
- Industrial organization
- Microeconomics
- Economics
- Structure-conduct-performance paradigm
- Business economics
- Stackelberg competition
- Competition (economics)
- Porter's five forces analysis
