= Frederic M. Scherer =

American economist and industrial organization expert (1932–2025)

Frederic Michael Scherer (August 1, 1932 – May 25, 2025) was an American economist and expert on industrial organization. From 2006, he worked as a professor of economics at the JFK School of Government at Harvard University.

== Background ==
Scherer received his A.B. degree with honors and distinction from the University of Michigan and his M.B.A. with high distinction from Harvard University in 1958 and his PhD in economics from Harvard in 1963. He was married to Barbara Silbermann Scherer, and the couple had three children and eight grandchildren. Frederic M. Scherer died on May 25, 2025, at the age of 92.

== Career ==
Scherer served as the chief economist for the Federal Trade Commission in 1974–76. He has taught at Princeton University, Northwestern University, Swarthmore College, Haverford College, the University of Bayreuth and the Central European University. Since 2006 Scherer has been emeritus Professor of Public Policy and Corporate Management in the Aetna Chair, in the John F. Kennedy School of Government, Harvard University.

His research specialties include industrial economics and the economics of technological change, on which he has many much-cited publications, including the books listed below, and the articles. His 1971 textbook on Industrial Organization has gone through many editions, and Scherer still participated on the advisory board for the scholarly magazine of the same name. Scherer has also published recently concerning patent policy reform. Upon the death of Thomas McCraw, Scherer may be the scholar with the most expertise concerning the theories of former Harvard professor Joseph Schumpeter, about whom he has made a series of YouTube videos.

== Honors ==
Scherer received the first "Distinguished Fellow Award" from the Industrial Organization Society in 1999; the second was Jean Tirole, who later received the Nobel Prize in 2014 for his work in industrial organization. Scherer also received an honorary doctorate from the University of Hohenheim, Germany. He served as the 3rd president of the Industrial Organization Society, as well as of the International Joseph A. Schumpeter Society, and vice president of the American Economic Association and of the Southern Economic Association. He received the Lifetime Achievement Award from the American Antitrust Institute in 2002.

== Publications ==
- Frederic M. Scherer, Monopolies, Mergers and Competition Policy (Edward Elgar Pub) March 30, 2018
- Frederic M. Scherer, Quarter Notes and Bank Notes: The Economics of Music Composition in the 18th and 19th Centuries (Princeton University Press, 2004).
- Frederic M. Scherer, Competition Policy, Domestic and International (Edward Elgar, 2001).
- Frederic M. Scherer, New Perspectives on Economic Growth and Technological Innovation (Brookings Institution, 1999).
- Frederic M. Scherer, Industry Structure, Strategy, and Public Policy (HarperCollins, 1996). ISBN 9780673992895.
- Frederic M. Scherer, Competition Policies for an Integrated World Economy (Brookings Institution, 1994).
- Frederic M. Scherer and David J. Ravenscraft, International High-Technology Competition; Competition Policies for an Integrated World Economy; Mergers, Sell-offs, and Economic Efficiency (Harvard University Press, 1992).
- Frederic M. Scherer and David Ross, [1970] 1990. Industrial Market Structure and Economic Performance, 3rd ed. Houghton-Mifflin. Description and 1st ed. review extract.
- Frederic M. Scherer and David J. Ravenscraft, Mergers, Sell-offs, and Economic Efficiency (Brookings Institution, 1987).
- Frederic M. Scherer, Innovation and Growth: Schumpeterian Perspectives(MIT Press, 1984).
- Frederic M. Scherer, The Economic Effects of Compulsory Patent Licensing (New York University Monograph Series in Finance and Economics, 1977).
- Frederic M. Scherer with Alan Beckenstein, Erich Kaufer, and R. D. Murphy, The Economics of Multi-Plant Operation: An International Comparisons Study (Harvard University Press, 1975).
- Frederic M. Scherer, Industrial Market Structure and Economic Performance (first ed. 1970; second ed. 1980; third ed. (with David Ross) 1990; Houghton Mifflin).
- Frederic M. Scherer, Focal Point Pricing and Conscious Parallelism (The Antitrust Bulletin: the Journal of American and Foreign Antitrust & Trade Regulation, p. 495-503, Vol 12, 1967)
- Frederic M. Scherer and M. J. Peck, The Weapons Acquisition Process: Economic Incentives (Harvard Business School Division of Research, 1964).
- Frederic M. Scherer and M. J. Peck, The Weapons Acquisition Process: An Economic Analysis (Harvard Business School Division of Research, 1962).
