= Oligopsony =

Market structure with few buyers

An oligopsony (from Greek ὀλίγοι (oligoi) "few" and ὀψωνία (opsōnia) "purchase") is a market form in which the number of buyers is small while the number of sellers in theory could be large. This typically happens in a market for inputs where numerous suppliers are competing to sell their product to a small number of (often large and powerful) buyers. It contrasts with an oligopoly, where there are many buyers but few sellers. An oligopsony is a form of imperfect competition.

The terms monopoly (one seller), monopsony (one buyer), and bilateral monopoly have a similar relationship.

== Industry examples ==
In each of these cases, the buyers have a major advantage over the sellers. They can play off one supplier against another, thus lowering their costs. They can also dictate exact specifications to suppliers, for delivery schedules, quality, and (in the case of agricultural products) crop varieties. They also pass off much of the risks of overproduction, natural losses, and variations in cyclical demand to the suppliers.

=== Agriculture ===
One example of an oligopsony in the world economy is cocoa, where three firms (Cargill, Archer Daniels Midland, and Barry Callebaut) buy the vast majority of world cocoa bean production, mostly from small farmers in third-world countries. Likewise, American tobacco growers face an oligopsony of cigarette makers, where three companies (Altria, Brown & Williamson, and Lorillard Tobacco Company) buy almost 90% of all tobacco grown in the US and other countries.

=== Publishing ===
In U.S. publishing, five publishers known as the Big Five account for about two thirds of books published. Each of the companies runs a series of specialized imprints, which cater to different market segments and often carry the name of formerly independent publishers. Imprints create the illusion that there are many publishers, but imprints within each publisher co-ordinate to avoid competing with one another when they seek to acquire new books from authors.

Thus, authors have fewer truly-independent outlets for their work. That depresses advances paid to authors and creates pressure for authors to cater to the tastes of the publishers in order to ensure publication, reducing viewpoint diversity.

=== Retail ===
Over at least 30 years, supermarkets in developed economies around the world have acquired an increasing share of grocery markets. In doing so, they have increased their influence over suppliers—what food is grown and how it is processed and packaged—with impacts reaching deep into the lives and livelihoods of farmers and workers worldwide. In addition to increasing their market share with consumers, consolidation of suppliers means that retailers can exercise significant market power. In some countries, this has led to allegations of abuse, unethical and illegal conduct.

The situation in Australia is a good example since two retailers, Coles and Woolworths control 70% of the national food market.

== Sources ==
- Bhaskar, V., A. Manning and T. To (2002) 'Oligopsony and Monopsonistic Competition in Labor Markets,' Journal of Economic Perspectives, 16, 155–174.
- Bhaskar, V. and T. To (2003) 'Oligopsony and the Distribution of Wages,' European Economic Review, 47, 371–399.
