= William G. Shepherd =

American journalist and writer (1876–1933)

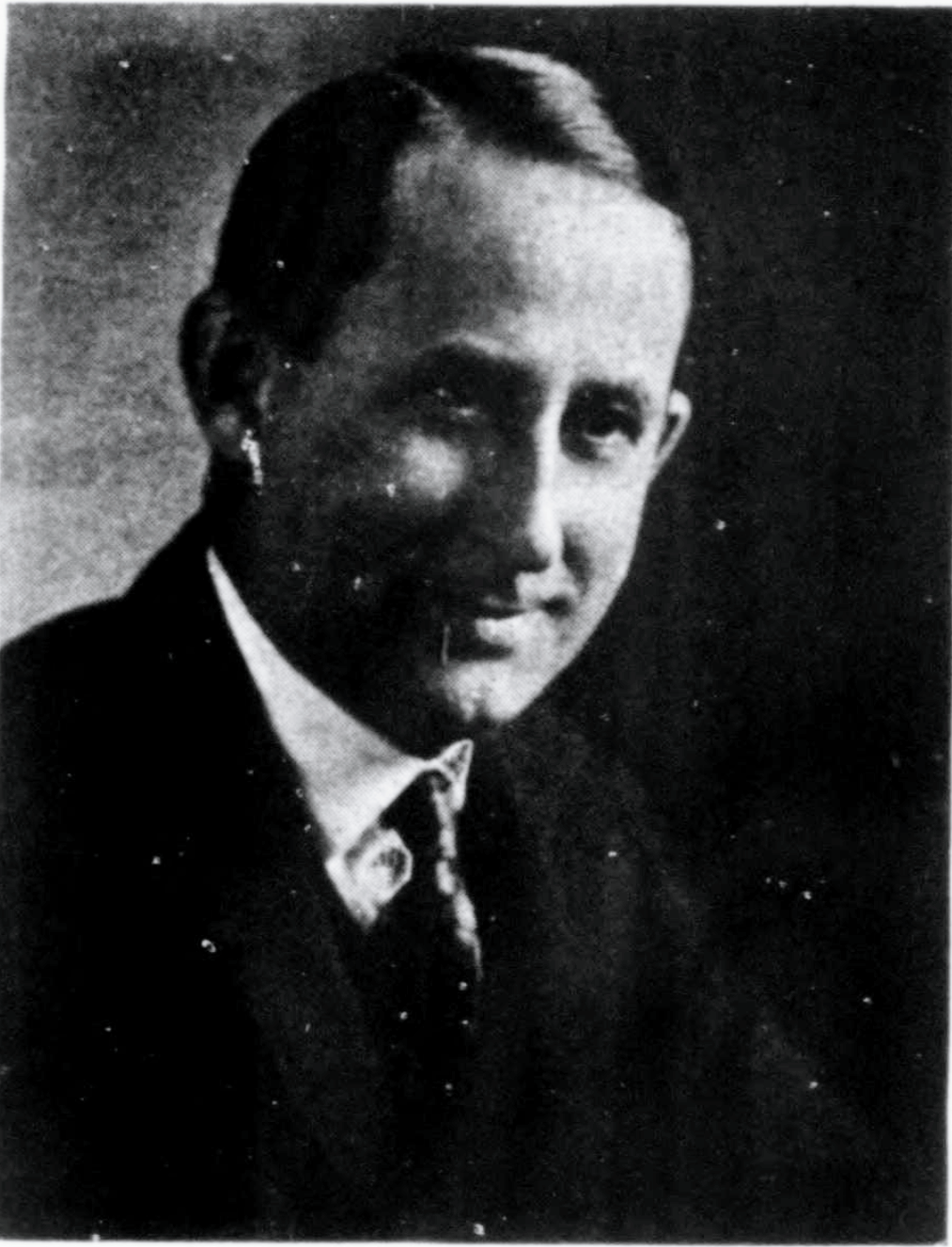
- William G. Shepherd in 1922
- Born: June 13, 1878; Springfield, Ohio, US
- Died: November 4, 1933 (aged 55); Washington, D.C., US
- Occupations: Journalist, war correspondent, writer
- Employers: Saint Paul Dispatch; Munsey's Magazine; Newspaper Enterprise Association; United Press; Everybody’s Magazine; Collier's; Harper's Magazine; Metropolitan Magazine (New York City)
- Known for: Reporting from Europe during World War I and Interwar period
- Notable work: The Confessions of a War Correspondent (1917)
- Spouse: Elizabeth Striebinger
- Children: William Gunn Shepherd Jr. (son); Robert Suclare Shepherd (son)
- Parents: Harrison T. Shepherd (father); Sarah Leming Shepherd (mother)

William Gunn Shepherd (1878–1933) was an American journalist, fiction writer and war correspondent. Shepherd is best known for his reporting from Europe during the First World War.

Shepherd also covered the Mexican Revolution and accompanied Francisco I. Madero on his march to Mexico City in 1911. In 1917 Shepherd traveled to Saint Peterburg to cover the Russian Revolution (1917).

== Early life and education ==
Shepherd was born in Springfield, Ohio, and was the son of Harrison T. Shepherd and Sarah Leming Shepherd. He was educated in Saint Paul, Minnesota, attending local schools and the Summer School of the University of Minnesota.

== Career ==
Shepherd began his journalism career in 1898 with the Saint Paul Dispatch. Shepherd moved to New York in 1908, where he initially wrote fiction for Munsey's Magazine. His career as a foreign correspondent took off when he covered the Mexican Revolution and accompanied Francisco I. Madero on his march to Mexico City in 1911.

In 1912, Shepherd went to Europe as a correspondent for the Newspaper Enterprise Association, where he covered the Summer Olympic Games in Stockholm (1912) and reported on political events across European capitals. He returned to Mexico in 1913 to report on the downfall of Victoriano Huerta and covered U.S. military actions in Veracruz.

=== First World War ===
During World War I, Shepherd served as a European correspondent, reporting for various publications, including Everybody’s Magazine, Collier's, Harper's, and Metropolitan Magazine. He covered battles from multiple fronts, working alongside French, British, American, Belgian, Italian, Russian, German, and Austrian forces. Some of his wartime experiences were detailed in his memoirs, The Confessions of a War Correspondent published in 1917.

Shepherd also reported on the Russian Revolution of 1917 from Saint Petersburg and Moscow as a correspondent for the United Press, the Exchange Telegraph of London, and Everybody's Magazine. Following this, he covered the Paris Peace Conference and the signing of the Treaty of Versailles for Everybody’s Magazine and The New York Evening Post.

== Post-war career ==
Post-war, Shepherd continued his journalism career by investigating and writing extensively on reconstruction in Germany, France, and the United Kingdom. He also explored diverse topics such as crime, prohibition enforcement, and organized crime in the United States. From 1924 until his death, he was a staff correspondent for Collier’s Weekly.

He also wrote extensively on controversial topics, such as prison methods and labor conditions in sweatshops. One notable investigative piece was his examination of the claim that John Wilkes Booth had escaped execution and lived in Texas and Oklahoma; Shepherd concluded that this theory was a myth in an article for Harper’s Magazine.

== Personal life ==
In 1917, Shepherd married Elizabeth Striebinger of Cleveland, Ohio. The couple had two sons, William Gunn Jr. and Robert Suclare Shepherd. Shepherd was actively involved in several professional organizations, including the Authors Guild, the Authors League of America, the Players and Dutch Treat Clubs in New York City, the Overseas Writers and National Press Club in Washington, D.C., and the Foreign Press Correspondents Club in Mexico City.

At the time of his death, Shepherd was a staff writer for Collier’s Magazine. Shepherd died from bronchial pneumonia on November 4, 1933, at George Washington University Hospital in Washington, D.C., after falling ill earlier that week. He was 55 years old at the time of his death.

== Publications ==
In addition to his journalism, Shepherd authored several books, including The Scar That Tripled, Boy’s Own Book of Politics, Great Preachers as Seen by a Journalist, and his memoirs, The Confessions of a War Correspondent.
