= Structure–conduct–performance paradigm =

Model in industrial organization economics

The structure–conduct–performance (SCP) paradigm, first published by economists Edward Chamberlin and Joan Robinson in 1933 and subsequently developed by Joe S. Bain, is a model in industrial organization economics that offers a causal theoretical explanation for firm performance through economic conduct on incomplete markets. This model has had direct influence on subsequent industrial economics models such as Porter's five forces analysis.

According to the structure–conduct–performance paradigm, the market environment has a direct, short-term impact on the market structure. The market structure then has a direct influence on the firm's economic conduct, which in turn affects its market performance. Therein, feedback effects occur such that market performance may impact conduct and structure, or conduct may affect the market structure. Additionally, external factors such as legal or political interventions affect the market framework and, by extension, the structure, conduct and performance of the market.

The structure–conduct–performance paradigm was subject to severe criticism from the Chicago School of Economics and by the 1980s was largely displaced by applications of game theory
