= Phillip Areeda =

American legal scholar known for his treatise on antitrust law

Phillip E. Areeda
- Born: January 28, 1930; Detroit, Michigan, U.S.
- Died: December 24, 1995 (aged 65); Cambridge, Massachusetts, U.S.
- Education: Harvard University (AB, LLB)

Phillip Elias Areeda (January 28, 1930 – December 24, 1995) was an American legal scholar known for his scholarship on U.S. antitrust law. Areeda was a professor at Harvard Law School from 1961 until his death in 1995.

== Life and career ==
Areeda was born in Detroit, Michigan, in 1930. He was of Lebanese ancestry. He studied economics at Harvard University, graduating in 1951 with an A.B., summa cum laude. He then attended Harvard Law School, where he was an editor of the Harvard Law Review and graduated in 1954 with an LL.B., summa cum laude.

After law school, Areeda served in the U.S. Air Force for two years. In 1956, he was appointed Special Assistant in the White House Office, and in 1958 he was appointed Assistant Special Counsel to the President. As Assistant Special Counsel, he helped draft and research White House staff studies dealing with economic and legal matters. Areeda continued in these duties until the end of the Eisenhower Administration. In 1961 he accepted a position on the Harvard Law School faculty, and published a book, Antitrust Analysis, in 1967. In the autumn of 1974 and winter of 1975, he briefly served as an assistant White House counsel in the Ford Administration.

Areeda was elected a Fellow of the American Academy of Arts and Sciences in 1983. He died of leukemia in 1995 in Cambridge, Massachusetts aged 65. A building at Harvard Law, Areeda Hall, is named in his honor.
