= Monopolistic competition =

Imperfect competition of differentiated products that are not perfect substitutes

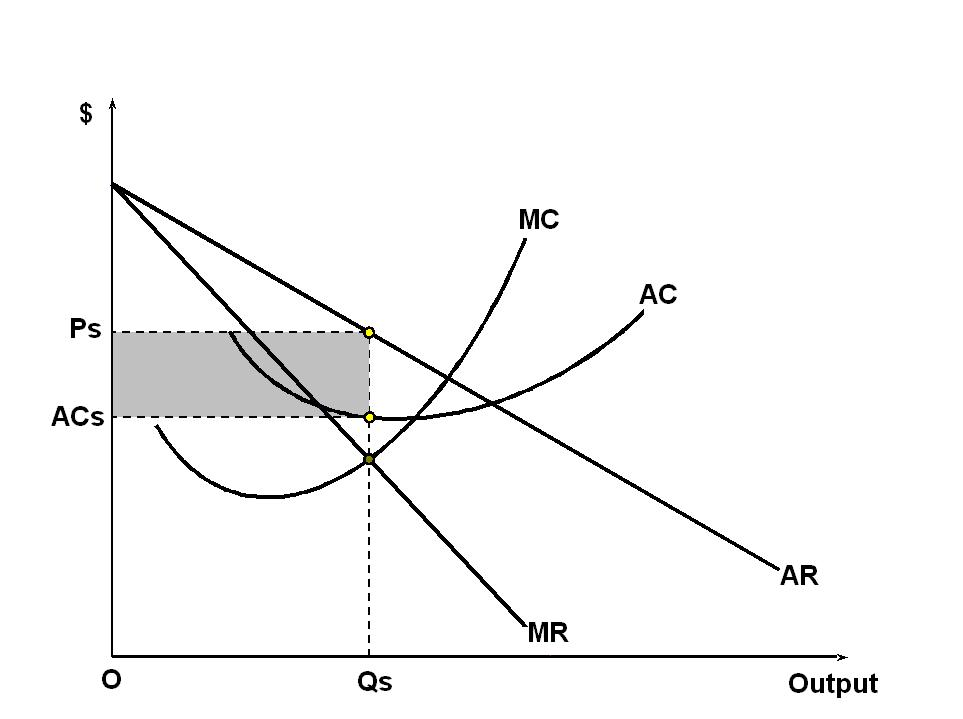
Short-run equilibrium of the company under monopolistic competition. The company maximises its profits and produces a quantity where the company's marginal revenue (MR) is equal to its marginal cost (MC). The company is able to collect a price based on the average revenue (AR) curve. The difference between the company's average revenue and average cost, multiplied by the quantity sold (Qs), gives the total profit. A short-run monopolistic competition equilibrium graph has the same properties of a monopoly equilibrium graph.

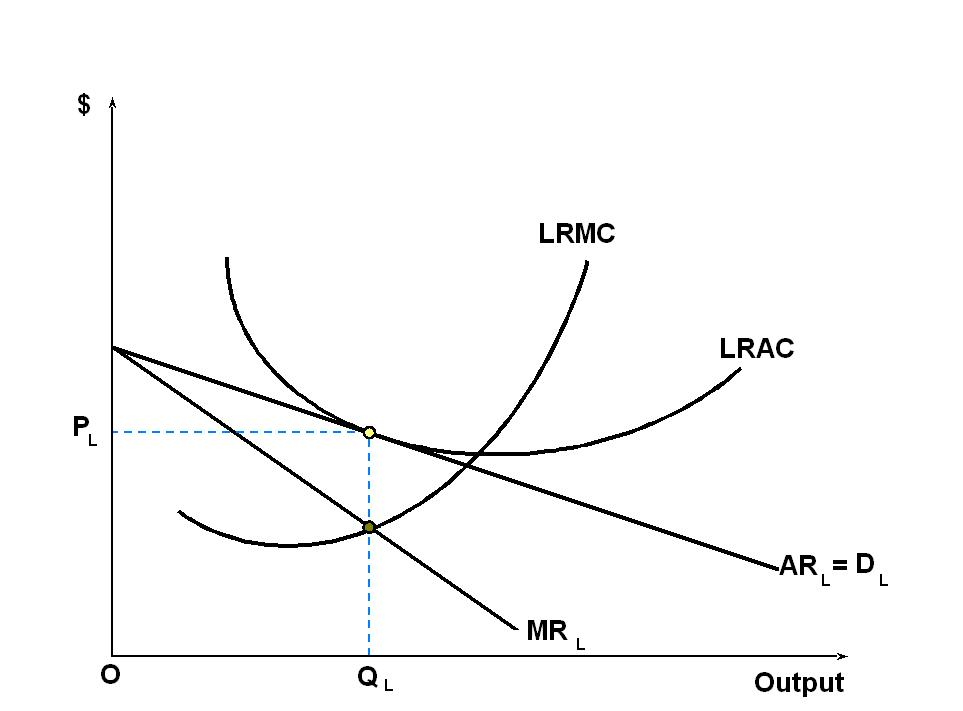
Long-run equilibrium of the company assuming monopolistic competition. The company still produces where marginal cost and marginal revenue are equal; however, the demand curve (MR and AR) has shifted as other companies entered the market and increased competition. The company no longer sells its goods above average cost and can no longer claim an economic profit.

Monopolistic competition is a type of imperfect competition such that there are many producers competing against each other but selling products that are differentiated from one another (e.g., branding, quality) and hence not perfect substitutes. For monopolistic competition, a company takes the prices charged by its rivals as given and ignores the effect of its own prices on the prices of other companies. If this happens in the presence of a coercive government, monopolistic competition may evolve into government-granted monopoly. Unlike perfect competition, the company may maintain spare capacity. Models of monopolistic competition are often used to model industries. Textbook examples of industries with market structures similar to monopolistic competition include restaurants, cereals, clothing, shoes, and service industries in large cities. The earliest developer of the theory of monopolistic competition is Edward Hastings Chamberlin, who wrote a pioneering book on the subject, Theory of Monopolistic Competition (1933). Joan Robinson's book The Economics of Imperfect Competition presents a comparable theme of distinguishing perfect from imperfect competition. Further work on monopolistic competition was performed by Dixit and Stiglitz who created the Dixit-Stiglitz model which has proved applicable used in the subtopics of international trade theory, macroeconomics and economic geography.

Monopolistically competitive markets have the following characteristics:

- There are many producers and many consumers in the market, and no business has total control over the market price.
- Consumers perceive that there are non-price differences among the competitors' products.
- Companies operate with the knowledge that their actions will not affect other companies' actions.
- There are few barriers to entry and exit.
- Producers have a degree of control of price.
- The principal goal of the company is to maximize its profits.
- Factor prices and technology are given.
- A company is assumed to behave as if it knew its demand and cost curves with certainty.
- The decision regarding price and output of any company does not affect the behaviour of other companies in a group, i.e., effect of the decision made by a single company is spread sufficiently evenly across the entire group. Thus, there is no conscious rivalry among the companies.
- Each company earns only normal profit in the long run.
- Each company spends substantial amount on advertisement. The publicity and advertisement costs are known as selling costs.

The long-run characteristics of a monopolistically competitive market are almost the same as a perfectly competitive market. Two differences between the two are that monopolistic competition produces heterogeneous products and that monopolistic competition involves a great deal of non-price competition, which is based on subtle product differentiation. A company making profits in the short run will nonetheless only break even in the long run because demand will decrease and average total cost will increase, meaning that in the long run, a monopolistically competitive company will make zero economic profit. This illustrates the amount of influence the company has over the market; because of brand loyalty, it can raise its prices without losing all of its customers. This means that an individual company's demand curve is downward sloping, in contrast to perfect competition, which has a perfectly elastic demand schedule.

== Characteristics ==
There are eight characteristics of monopolistic competition (MC):

- Companies are price setters.
- Free movement of resources from one company to another.
- Product differentiation.
- Many companies.
- Freedom of entry and exit.
- Independent decision making.
- Some degree of market power.
- Buyers and sellers do not have perfect information.

=== Product differentiation ===
MC companies sell products that have real or perceived non-price differences. Examples of these differences could include physical aspects of the product, location from which it sells the product or intangible aspects of the product, among others. However, the differences are not so great as to eliminate other goods as substitutes. In technical terms, the cross price elasticity of demand between goods in such a market is large and positive. MC goods are best described as close but imperfect substitutes. The goods perform the same basic functions but have differences in qualities such as type, style, quality, reputation, appearance, and location that tend to distinguish them from each other. For example, the basic function of motor vehicles is the same—to move people and objects from point to point in reasonable comfort and safety. Yet there are many different types of motor vehicles such as motor scooters, motor cycles, trucks and cars, and many variations even within these categories.

=== Many companies ===
There are many companies in each MC product group and many companies on the side lines prepared to enter the market. A product group is a "collection of similar products". The fact that there are "many companies" means that each company has a small market share. This gives each MC company the freedom to set prices without engaging in strategic decision making regarding the prices of other companies (no mutual dependence) and each company's actions effect the market negligibly. For example, a company could reduce prices and increase sales without fear that its actions will prompt retaliatory responses from competitors.

The number of companies that an MC market structure will support at market equilibrium depends on factors such as fixed costs, economies of scale, and the degree of product differentiation. For example, the greater the fixed costs, the fewer companies the market will support.

=== Freedom of entry and exit ===
Like perfect competition, with monopolistic competition also, the companies can enter or exit freely. The companies will enter when the existing companies are making super-normal profits. With the entry of new companies, the supply would increase which would reduce the price and hence the existing companies will be left only with normal profits. Similarly, if the existing companies are sustaining losses, some of the marginal companies will quit. It will reduce the supply due to which price would rise and the existing companies will be left only with normal profit.

=== Independent decision-making ===
Each MC company independently sets the terms of exchange for its product. The company gives no consideration to what effect its decision may have on its competitors. The theory is that any action will have such a negligible effect on the overall market demand that an MC company can act without fear of prompting heightened competition. In other words, each company feels free to set prices as if it were a monopoly rather than an oligopoly.

=== Market power ===
MC companies have some degree of market power, although relatively little. Market power means that the company has control over the terms and conditions of exchange. All MC companies are price makers. An MC companies can increase its prices without losing all its customers. The company can also decrease prices without triggering a potentially ruinous price competition with other companies. The source of an MC company's market power is not barriers to entry since they are low. Rather, an MC company has market power because it has relatively few competitors, those competitors do not engage in strategic decision making and the companies sells differentiated product. Market power also means that an MC company faces a downward sloping demand curve. In the long run, the demand curve is very elastic, meaning that it is sensitive to price changes, although it is not completely "flat". In the short run, economic profit is positive, but it approaches zero in the long run.

=== Imperfect information ===
No other sellers or buyers have complete market information, like market demand or market supply.

Market structure comparison
| Market Structure | Number of firms | Market power | Elasticity of demand | Product differentiation | Excess profits | Efficiency | Profit maximization condition | Pricing power |
|---|---|---|---|---|---|---|---|---|
| Perfect competition | Infinite | None | Perfectly elastic | None | Short term yes, long term no | Yes | P=MR=MC | Price taker |
| Monopolistic competition | Many | Low | Highly elastic (long run) | High | Short term yes, long term no | No | MR=MC | Price setter |
| Monopoly | One | High | Relatively inelastic | Absolute (across industries) | Yes | No | MR=MC | Price setter |

== Inefficiency ==
There are two sources of inefficiency in the MC market structure. The first source of inefficiency is that, at its optimum output, the company charges a price that exceeds marginal costs. The MC company maximises profits where marginal revenue equals marginal cost. Since the MC company's demand curve is downwards-sloping, the company will charge a price that exceeds marginal costs. The monopoly power possessed by a MC company means that at its profit-maximising level of production, there will be a net loss of consumer (and producer) surplus. The second source of inefficiency is the fact that MC companies operate with excess capacity. That is that the MC company's profit-maximising output is less than the output associated with minimum average cost. Both an MC and PC company will operate at a point where demand or price equals average cost. For a PC company, this equilibrium condition occurs where the perfectly elastic demand curve equals minimum average cost. An MC company's demand curve is not flat but is downward-sloping. Thus, the demand curve will be tangential to the long-run average cost curve at a point to the left of its minimum. The result is excess capacity.

=== Socially undesirable aspects compared to perfect competition ===
- Selling costs: Producers under monopolistic competition often spend substantial amounts on advertising and publicity. Much of this expenditure is wasteful from the social point of view. The producer can reduce the price of the product instead of spending on publicity.
- Excess capacity: Under imperfect competition, the installed capacity of every firm is large but not fully used. Total output is, therefore, less than the output which is socially desirable. Since production capacity is not fully used, the resources lie idle. Therefore, the production under monopolistic competition is below the full capacity level.
- Unemployment: Idle capacity under monopolistic competition expenditure leads to unemployment. In particular, unemployment of workers leads to poverty and misery in the society. If idle capacity is fully used, the problem of unemployment can be solved to some extent.
- Cross transport: Under monopolistic competition expenditure is incurred on cross transportation. If the goods are sold locally, wasteful expenditure on cross transport could be avoided.
- Lack of specialization: Under monopolistic competition, there is little scope for specialization or standardisation. Product differentiation practised under this competition leads to wasteful expenditure. It is argued that instead of producing too many similar products, only a few standardised products may be produced. This would ensure better allocation of resources and would promote the economic success of the society.
- Inefficiency: Under perfect competition, an inefficient company is thrown out of the industry. But under monopolistic competition, inefficient companies continue to survive.

== Problems ==
Monopolistically-competitive companies are inefficient, it is usually the case that the costs of regulating prices for products sold in monopolistic competition exceed the benefits of such regulation. A monopolistically-competitive company might be said to be marginally inefficient because the company produces at an output where average total cost is not a minimum. A monopolistically competitive market is a productively inefficient market structure because firms do not produce at the minimum of their average total cost (ATC) curve. Monopolistically-competitive markets are also allocative-inefficient, as the company charges prices that exceed marginal cost. Product differentiation increases total utility by better meeting people's wants than homogenous products in a perfectly competitive market.

Another concern is that monopolistic competition fosters advertising. There are two main ways to conceive how advertising works under a monopolistic competition framework. Advertising can cause either a company's perceived demand curve to become more inelastic or demand for the company's product to increase. In either case, a successful advertising campaign may allow a company to sell a greater quantity or to charge a higher price, or both, and thus increase its profits. This allows the creation of brand names. Advertising induces customers into spending more on products because of the name associated with them rather than because of rational factors. Defenders of advertising dispute this, arguing that brand names can represent a guarantee of quality and that advertising helps reduce the cost to consumers of weighing the trade-offs of numerous competing brands. There are unique information and information processing costs associated with selecting a brand in a monopolistically competitive environment. In a monopoly market, the consumer is faced with a single brand, making information gathering relatively inexpensive. In a perfectly competitive industry, the consumer is faced with many brands, but because the brands are virtually identical information gathering is also relatively inexpensive. In a monopolistically competitive market, the consumer must collect and process information on a large number of different brands to be able to select the best of them. In many cases, the cost of gathering information necessary to selecting the best brand can exceed the benefit of consuming the best brand instead of a randomly selected brand. The result is that the consumer is confused. Some brands gain prestige value and can extract an additional price for that.

Evidence suggests that consumers use information obtained from advertising not only to assess the single brand advertised, but also to infer the possible existence of brands that the consumer has, heretofore, not observed, as well as to infer consumer satisfaction with brands similar to the advertised brand.

== Examples ==
In many markets, such as toothpaste, soap, air conditioning, smartphones, food and toilet paper, producers practice product differentiation by altering the physical composition of products, using special packaging, or simply claiming to have superior products based on brand images or advertising.

== See also ==
- Atomistic market
- Business oligarch
- Government-granted monopoly
- Imperfect competition
- Microeconomics
- Monopolistic competition in international trade
- Monopoly
- Natural monopoly
- Oligopoly
- Perfect competition
