= 2009 in the United Kingdom =

Events from the year 2009 in the United Kingdom.

== Incumbents ==
- Monarch – Elizabeth II
- Prime Minister – Gordon Brown (Labour)

== Events ==
=== January ===
- 1 January – A British soldier from 6th Battalion The Rifles, later named by the Ministry of Defence as Sergeant Christopher Reed, is killed in an explosion in Southern Afghanistan. This takes the total number of British forces to die in the conflict to 138.
- 2 January – Celebrity Big Brother returns to Channel 4 for the first time since 2007 following the racism controversy that dominated that year's show. Participants include La Toya Jackson, Verne Troyer and Ulrika Jonsson.
- 5 January
  - Cold weather consisting of snow and freezing temperatures causes widespread disruption across the UK. Travel routes are severely affected including roads and railways, in addition to Luton and Birmingham airports. The weather also leads to the closure of many schools which were due to return after the Christmas break.
  - Waterford Wedgwood, makers of the famous Wedgwood pottery, enter administration.
- 6 January
  - The cold weather affecting the UK continues to cause widespread disruption across the country. The continued freezing temperatures lead to millions of people becoming eligible for cold weather payments from the government.
  - The closure of Woolworths is completed across the UK, having started at the end of December, spelling an end to 100 years of the retail chain. The company was placed into administration in November 2008, with its 813 stores gradually being phased out. More than 27,000 jobs have been lost as a result of the company's collapse.
- 7 January
  - Marks & Spencer announce they are to close 25 of their Simply Food stores and cut 1,230 jobs, after they announce pre-Christmas like-for-like sales fell by 7.1%.
  - England Cricket Captain, Kevin Pietersen resigns after months of rows with England manager, Peter Moores. Moores is sacked from his job by the England and Wales Cricket Board. Andrew Strauss is named as the new Captain.
  - There is more bad news for the economy as new car sales for 2008 are reported to have fallen to a 12-year low of just over 2.1 million.
- 8 January – The Bank of England cuts its base interest rate to 1.5% amid the global economic downturn, the lowest it has been in the bank's 300-year history.
- 11 January
  - The News of the World reports that Prince Harry has been filmed using racist language towards a Pakistani member of his army platoon. Prince Harry swiftly apologises amid widespread condemnation.
  - A Royal Marine from 45 Commando, later named by the Ministry of Defence as Marine Travis Mackin, is killed in an explosion in Southern Afghanistan. This takes the total number of British forces to die in the conflict to 139.
- 12 January – At the 66th Golden Globe Awards, British actress Kate Winslet wins two awards, Best Actress (Motion Picture Drama) and Best Supporting Actress (Motion Picture); while British film Slumdog Millionaire wins all four of the awards for which it was nominated.
- 14 January
  - The government unveils a £20 billion loan guarantee scheme for small and medium-sized business amid the Great Recession. On the same day, Prime Minister, Gordon Brown, appoints former banker Mervyn Davies as the new Trade and Investment Minister.
  - Two British service personnel, a soldier from 29th Commando Regiment Royal Artillery, later named by the Ministry of Defence as Captain Tom Sawyer, and a marine from 45 Commando, later named as Marine Danny Winter, are killed in an explosion in southern Afghanistan. This takes the total number of British forces to die in the conflict to 141.
- 15 January – Approval is granted for the building of the controversial third runway and sixth terminal at Heathrow Airport. As part of the decision, the Secretary of State for Transport, Geoff Hoon, announces restrictions on aircraft using the third runway that are designed to limit noise pollution and carbon dioxide emissions, alongside proposals for a high-speed rail hub, also located at Heathrow. John McDonnell, Labour MP for Hayes and Harlington, the constituency which includes Heathrow Airport, is suspended from Parliament after picking up the ceremonial House of Commons mace in protest at the government's approval of a third runway.
- 16 January – The Financial Services Authority lifts the ban on the short selling of stocks in UK financial sector companies.
- 17 January – A British soldier from 1st Battalion The Rifles, later named as Corporal Richard Robinson, is killed by enemy fire in southern Afghanistan. This takes the total number of British forces to die in the conflict to 142.
- 19 January
  - Lloyds TSB completes the acquisition of the Halifax Bank of Scotland group, to form the Lloyds Banking Group.
  - The government announces further assistance for the banking sector, the second of the 2008 financial crisis. Measures announced include the government insuring bad debts and increasing its stake in Royal Bank of Scotland. The measures make little impact on the stock market, with banking stocks falling across the board.
  - The Royal Bank of Scotland announces it expects to have to write down assets totalling around £20 billion, believed to be the biggest loss in British corporate history. The announcement sees RBS' share price plunge 67% on the day.
- 20 January – The Office for National Statistics announces that the Consumer Price Index (CPI), the UK's main measure of inflation, has fallen by 1% from 4.1% to 3.1% since November 2008. Over the same time period, the Retail Price Index, an alternative measure of inflation, fell by 2.1% from 3.0% to 0.9%, the biggest fall in 28 years.
- 21 January – Statistics released by the Office for National Statistics show that the number of unemployed people in the UK has risen to more than 1.9 million, the highest level since late 1996.
- 22 January – The Disasters Emergency Committee of UK charities launches its Gaza Crisis Appeal following the recent conflict in the region. The BBC causes controversy by saying it will not be broadcasting the appeal as it would compromise its impartiality.
- 23 January
  - The Office for National Statistics announces that the United Kingdom's economy is officially in recession for the first time since 1991. The economy has now suffered three successive quarters of contraction, with the final quarter of last year seeing the economy shrink by 1.8% – one of the worst quarterly detractions since records began.
  - Karen Matthews and Michael Donavon are sentenced to eight years in prison for the kidnap of Shannon Matthews, the former's daughter, having held her captive in Donvon's flat in Dewsbury last year as part of a bid to claim £50,000 for her "safe return" after reporting her missing to the police.
  - Jonathan Ross returns to television after serving a three-month suspension from the BBC following the row over prank telephone calls made to Andrew Sachs.
- 24 January – Two climbers from Northern Ireland and another from Scotland are killed in an avalanche on Buachaille Etive Mòr in the Highlands of Scotland. Five others walk away uninjured, whilst another suffers a shoulder injury.
- 25 January – The Sunday Times publishes allegations that four Labour members of the House of Lords are willing to accept money to table amendments to legislation.
- 26 January – Possession of 'extreme pornography' becomes illegal under the Criminal Justice and Immigration Act 2008.
- 28 January
  - The International Monetary Fund projects that the UK economy will shrink by 2.8% in the forthcoming year, the biggest drop in any advanced nation.
  - Hundreds of workers strike at the Lindsey Oil Refinery in Lincolnshire in protest at the hiring of foreign construction workers at the site, despite rising unemployment in the UK.
  - Sir Paul Stephenson takes office as Metropolitan Police Commissioner.
- 30 January
  - 2009 Lindsey Oil Refinery strikes: Workers at around a dozen energy sites across the UK walk out in support of the workers at the Lindsey refinery, who walked out two days ago over the hiring of foreign workers.
  - A British soldier from 1st Battalion The Rifles, later named as Corporal Daniel Nield, is killed in a firefight in Southern Afghanistan. This takes the total number of British forces to die in the conflict to 143.

=== February ===
- 1 February – Three day state visit of Chinese Premier Wen Jiabao begins; pro-Tibet protestors stage2 a demonstration outside the Chinese embassy in London.
- 2 February
  - Heavy snow falls overnight across large parts of the country, causing widespread disruption. It is the heaviest snowfall in the UK for eighteen years. Many roads are blocked in the morning rush hour, whilst train services are disrupted and many airport runways closed. Transport for London suspends all London buses, and the London Underground is also severely disrupted. Meanwhile, thousands of schools are forced to close due to the adverse weather conditions.
  - Contractors at the Sellafield and Heysham nuclear plants walk out in the ongoing unofficial strike action over foreign workers.
- 3 February – Adverse weather conditions continue to cause widespread disruption to education and transport in large parts of England.
- 5 February
  - Further heavy snow in parts of England and Wales cause fresh school closures and travel disruption.
  - The Halifax reports a rise in house prices of 1.9% in January. However, it also reports that, on average, the price of a house fell by 17.2% in the 12 months since January 2008.
  - Workers participating in unofficial strikes over the use of foreign workers agree to return to work after a compromise deal is struck by Acas.
  - The Bank of England reduces the base rate of interest by 0.5% to 1.0%, the fifth reduction since October 2008.
  - Undefeated boxing champion Joe Calzaghe announces his retirement from the sport after 46 fights over more than 15 years.
- 8 February – At the 62nd British Academy Film Awards, the 'BAFTAs', British drama Slumdog Millionaire wins seven awards, including Best Film and Best Director for Danny Boyle. British actress Kate Winslet also wins the award for Best Leading Actress for her performance in The Reader.
- 9 February – Chelsea F.C. manager Luiz Felipe Scolari is dismissed by the club's board after results deteriorate "at a key time in the season". It comes just hours after fellow Premier League manager, Tony Adams of Portsmouth F.C., is dismissed, again after a poor run of results.
- 10 February – The former chief executives of the two British banks hit hardest by the 2008 financial crisis, Fred Goodwin of Royal Bank of Scotland and Andy Hornby of HBOS, apologise "profoundly and unreservedly" for their respective banks' failure in an evidence session with the Treasury Select Committee.
- 11 February
  - The Metropolitan Police announced they will not launch an investigation into the recent Cash for Influence scandal in the House of Lords.
  - The Deputy Chairman of the Financial Services Authority, Sir James Crosby, resigns amid allegations that, whilst chief executive of HBOS, he dismissed a senior manager who raised concerns that the bank was exposed to too much risk.
  - Four people, including two teenage air cadets, are killed in a mid-air collision between two light aircraft over the Welsh coast.
  - The Office for National Statistics announced that UK unemployment has risen to 1.97 million, an increase of 146,000 in the last three months.
- 12 February – A British soldier serving in Iraq, later named as Private Ryan Wrathall, dies in what the Ministry of Defence described as a 'shooting incident'. This takes the total number of British forces to die in the conflict to 179, and marks the first British death in Iraq in 2009.
- 13 February
  - Shares in the Lloyds Banking Group close down over 30% after they suggest that one of its subsidiaries, HBOS, would post annual losses of nearly £11 billion. In response, the Chancellor of the Exchequer, Alistair Darling, says that a 'range of options' remains in place to assist the banking system, and refuses to rule out full nationalisation.
  - A BA CityFlyer flight from Amsterdam loses its nosewheel on arrival at London City Airport due to a 'hard landing'. One passenger is hospitalised with minor injuries.
- 14 February – A Royal Marine from 45 Commando, later named by the Ministry of Defence as Marine Darren Smith, is killed by enemy gunfire in Southern Afghanistan. This takes the total number of British forces to die in the conflict to 144.
- 16 February – A British soldier from 1st Battalion The Rifles, later named as Lance Corporal Stephen Kingscott, is killed by enemy fire in Southern Afghanistan. This increases the total number of British forces to die in the conflict to 145.
- 17 February
  - Amid growing public and political pressure, the Chancellor of the Exchequer, Alistair Darling, announces a reduction in the payment of bonuses to senior staff at RBS and that these reduced bonuses will be paid in shares, rather than cash.
  - Official figures show that the UK's CPI, the official measure of inflation, has fallen by 0.1% in January to 3.1%. The alternative measure of inflation, the Retail Price Index, fell by 0.8% to 0.1% in the same monthly period.
- 18 February – The Yorkshire Ripper is released from Broadmoor Hospital to face a life sentence for killing 13 women and attempting to kill 7 more, after doctors claim he has been treated for schizophrenia.
- 22 February
  - At the 81st Academy Awards, British film Slumdog Millionaire wins 8 awards including Best Picture and Best Director. British actress Kate Winslet wins the Best Actress award for her role in The Reader.
  - TV personality, Jade Goody and her boyfriend, Jack Tweed, are married at Down Hall, Essex. Goody, 27, has had cervical cancer for six months and was told earlier this month that she may only have weeks to live after the cancer spread to her bowel, liver and groin. She dies at her home in Essex exactly one month later. Tweed is free on license following imprisonment for assault.
- 23 February – Binyam Mohamed, a British national suspected of involvement in terrorist activities, is returned to the United Kingdom after being held at Guantanamo Bay Detention Centre for more than four years. Mohammed alleges that he was subject to extraordinary rendition and that UK agents were complicit in his torture.
- 25 February
  - Three British soldiers from 1st Battalion The Rifles, later named as Corporal Tom Gaden, Lance Corporal Paul Upton and Rifleman Jamie Gunn, are killed in an explosion in Southern Afghanistan. In a separate incident, a Royal Marine from 45 Commando, Signaller Michael Laski, dies in a British hospital after sustaining injuries in the Aghan conflict on Monday 23 February. The four deaths take the total number of British forces to die in the Afghan conflict to 149.
  - Labour Party peer Lord Ahmed is sentenced to 12 weeks imprisonment for dangerous driving, having been involved in a fatal crash.
  - Prime Minister's Questions is suspended by the Speaker Michael Martin following a request from Prime Minister Gordon Brown as a mark of respect following the death of the six-year-old son of the Leader of the Opposition David Cameron. It is the first time that PMQs has been suspended since the death of the then Labour Party leader John Smith in 1994.
- 26 February – The Royal Bank of Scotland, as expected, announces annual losses totalling £24.1 billion, the biggest loss in British corporate history. It is also confirmed that the bank is to receive a further £13 billion from the government in return for an increased stake in the company. Alongside this announcement, the bank announces that its former chief executive, Fred Goodwin, is to receive a £693,000-a-year pension for life. This leads to widespread condemnation, whilst the government threaten legal action to claw back the payments.
- 27 February – Lloyds Banking Group announces that their HBOS subsidiary made annual losses of £10.8 billion in 2008. The Lloyds TSB division of the group made a profit of £807 million, down 80% on 2007.
- 28 February – The government launches an inquiry into a Fred Goodwin's pension and massive losses by HBOS in 2008.

=== March ===
- 1 March – Manchester United F.C. win the 2009 Carling Cup, beating Tottenham Hotspur F.C. 4–1 on penalties in the final. The scores stood level at 0–0 after 90 minutes and extra time.
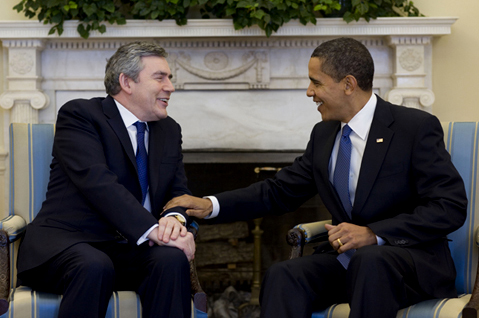
  Gordon Brown and President Barack Obama in the White House, 3 March 2009
- 4 March
  - Gordon Brown becomes the fifth British Prime Minister to address the United States Congress following talks with US President Barack Obama in Washington D.C.
  - ITV announces it is cutting 600 jobs after it reported a loss of £2.6 billion for 2008. The jobs will go from the company's Yorkshire studios in Leeds and from their headquarters in London.
- 5 March
  - The Bank of England reduces the base interest rate to 0.5%, its lowest ever level. It also announces plans to begin quantitative easing by injecting £75 billion into the British economy.
  - Michael Jackson announces the This Is It concert tour to take place at the O2 Arena in London. This is prevented by his death later this year.
- 6 March – Police launch an investigation after a protester throws green custard at the Business and Enterprise Secretary, Peter Mandelson, in protest at the government's decision to approve the construction of a third runway at Heathrow Airport.
- 7 March
  - The government takes a controlling stake, reported to be 65%, in the troubled Lloyds Banking Group. Toxic loans totalling £260 billion will be insured by the government as part of the deal.
  - Massereene Barracks shooting: Two soldiers from 38 Engineer Regiment are killed in a shooting attack at the Massereene Barracks in Antrim, Northern Ireland. The Real IRA claim responsibility for the attack which is met with widespread condemnation across the community.
- 9 March – A police officer is shot dead in Craigavon, County Armagh. A dissident republican group, the Continuity IRA, claim responsibility for the attack, the second of its kind in two days.
- 13 March – Comic Relief 2009 raises a record total in excess of £57 million at the climax of their telethon, surpassing the amount raised during the 2007 telethon by over £17 million.
- 14 March – A British soldier from Royal Welsh Regiment, 2nd Battalion, later named as Lance Corporal Christopher Harkett, is killed in an explosion in Southern Afghanistan. It takes the total number of British forces to die in the conflict to 150.
- 16 March – Two British soldiers from Royal Electrical and Mechanical Engineers, 1st The Queen's Dragoon Guards, later named as Corporals Graeme Stiff and Dean John, are killed in an explosion in Southern Afghanistan. The deaths take the total number of British forces to die in the Afghan conflict to 152.
- 18 March
  - The Office for National Statistics announce that UK unemployment rose to 2.03 million in the three months to January. It takes unemployment above 2 million for the first time since 1997.
  - Sean Hodgson, who has served 27 years in prison since being convicted of murder in 1982, is acquitted at the Court of Appeal in London.
- 24 March – The Consumer Price Index, the government's preferred measure of inflation, unexpectedly rises to 3.2% in February, a rise of 0.2% on the previous month. The alternative measure of inflation, the Retail Price Index falls to 0.0% for the first time in nearly 50 years.
- 27 March – Official figures confirm that the United Kingdom is still in recession, with the economy shrinking by 1.6% in the final quarter of 2008 compared to the third quarter.
- 29 March – It emerges that Home Secretary Jacqui Smith submitted an expenses claim for a TV package which included pornographic films watched by her husband.

=== April ===
- April – The economy continues to decline dramatically, with statistics showing a 2.4% rate of contraction for the first quarter of this year.
- 1 April
  - A Super Puma helicopter crashes in the North Sea whilst transporting oil-rig workers. All 16 people on board, 14 passengers and 2 crew, are killed.
  - Protests are held across London ahead of the following day's G20 summit. Police report 63 arrests across the city, where a branch of the Royal Bank of Scotland is targeted by protesters, believed to be as a result of the ongoing anger at the pension of former chief executive, Fred Goodwin. The Metropolitan Police later announce that one protester had died of a heart-attack during the protests.
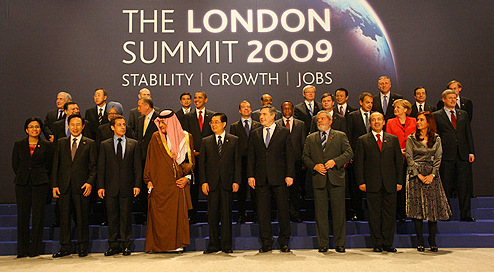
    The world leaders present at the G-20 London Summit, 2 April 2009
    On 5 April the Independent Police Complaints Commission announces an investigation into the death of Ian Tomlinson, the protester. Video footage emerges on 7 April showing him being pushed to the ground by a police officer.
- 2 April – The 2009 G20 London summit is held in response to the 2008 financial crisis and the Great Recession. The summit ends in the leaders announcing various measures, including a $1.1 trillion investment in the International Monetary Fund (IMF) and World Bank.
- 3 April – Vincent Nichols is named as the new Archbishop of Westminster and head of the Roman Catholic Church in England and Wales, replacing Cardinal Cormac Murphy O'Connor.
- 8 April
  - Analogue television signals begin to be switched off in the Westcountry Television area as part of the UK's ongoing process of digital switchover.
  - Police and MI5 conduct eight counter-terrorism raids in North-West England. The raids have had to be brought forward because operational details had been visible on a document being carried by an assistant Commissioner of the Metropolitan Police Bob Quick as he arrived at 10 Downing Street for a meeting with the Prime Minister earlier in the day; Mr Quick resigned the following day.
- 11 April – Gordon Brown's special adviser Damian McBride resigns his position after it emerges that he and another prominent Labour Party operative, blogger Derek Draper, had exchanged a series of emails in which they discussed plans to smear Conservative Party politicians with a series of false stories about their private lives.
- 16 April – Horrible Histories premieres on CBBC.
- 22 April
  - Alistair Darling, the Chancellor of the Exchequer delivers the government's budget to the House of Commons. It includes the introduction of a 50% tax rate for those earning in excess of £150,000 and the announcement that Britain's debt level will rise to 79% of GDP by 2013.
  - Figures show unemployment has now risen to more than 2.1 million, the highest level seen under the current government.
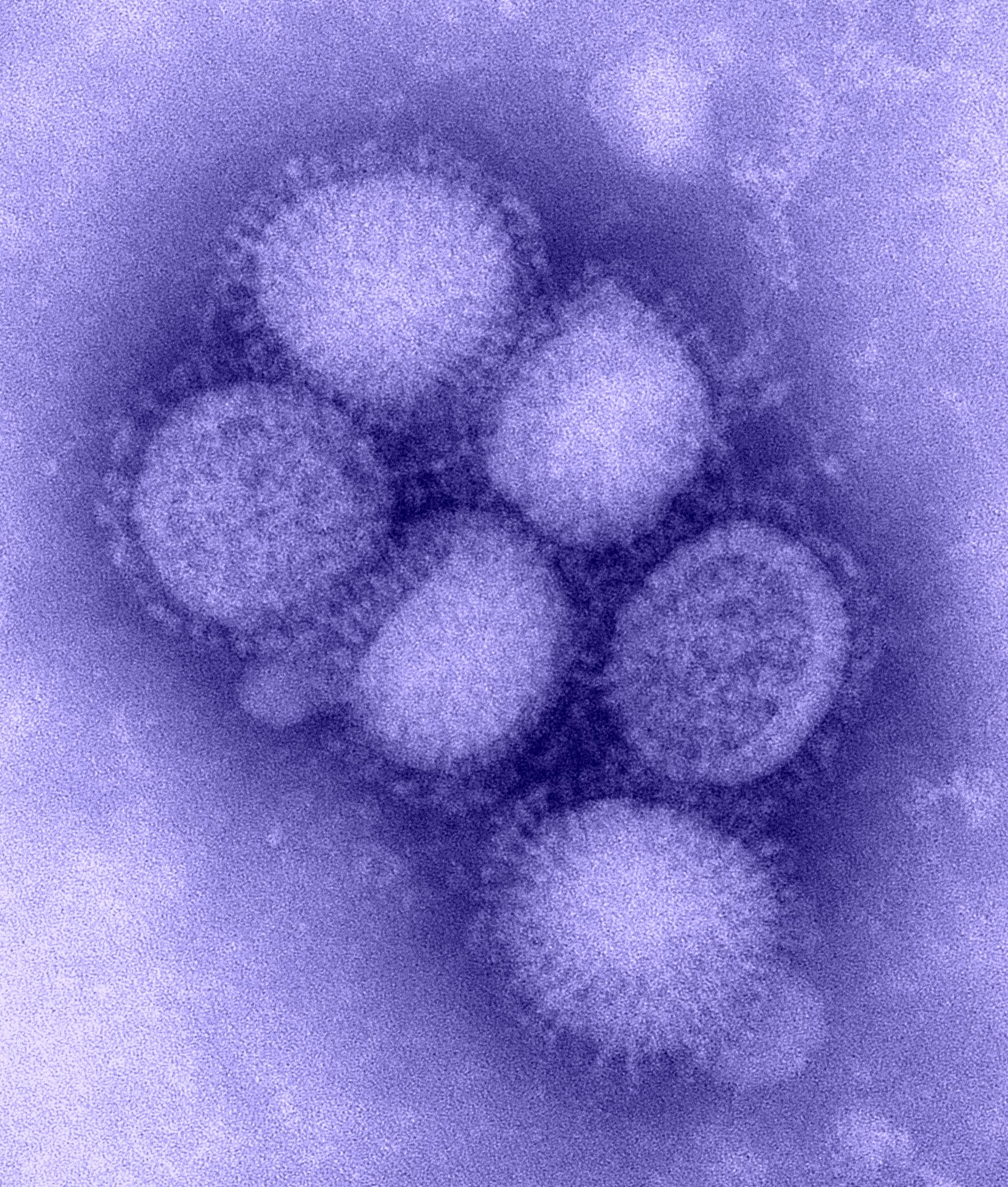
    Magnified image of the H1NI flu virus, origin of a pandemic.
- 27 April – 2009 swine flu pandemic: The pandemic H1N1/09 virus originating in Mexico spreads to the UK, with 2 cases confirmed in Scotland.
- 29 April
  - Three cases of swine flu are confirmed in England. One adult is diagnosed in Redditch, another in South London, whilst a 12-year-old girl is diagnosed in Torbay. Meanwhile, the Scottish Health Secretary, Nicola Sturgeon announces that 15 suspected cases in Scotland are negative.
  - The government is defeated on an opposition day motion in the House of Commons by 267 votes to 246 over their policy on Gurkha settlement rights.
- 30 April
  - A further three cases of swine flu are confirmed by the Department of Health. Two of the cases are located in London, with the third being in Newcastle.
  - The British military operation in Iraq officially ends after six years of combat. The Basra Province is handed over to American forces in a special ceremony, ahead of the withdrawal of British troops in the summer.
  - The House of Commons pass a number of reforms to the rules governing MPs allowances.

=== May ===
- 1 May – The number of confirmed swine flu cases in the UK reaches 99. Notably, the first cases of human to human transmission of the virus are confirmed in Scotland and South Gloucestershire.
- 8 May – The Daily Telegraph obtains a full copy of MPs' expenses claims and begins publishing them unredacted prior to the official parliamentary publication date of 1 July, reigniting the MPs' expenses controversy.
- 12 May – Conservative leader of the opposition David Cameron says he will pay back a £680 expenses claim on his constituency home. He also orders fellow Tory MPs to repay thousands of pounds in claims as the on-going expenses scandal engulfs parliament.
- 14 May – A number of MPs from all parties are either suspended or announce their resignations due to the expenses scandal. Several weeks later almost 100 MPs will have announced that they will not be standing at the next general election.
- 16 May – Manchester United win the Premier League championship for the third consecutive year after a 0–0 draw against Arsenal F.C. at their home ground, Old Trafford. They have now equalled Liverpool's record tally of 18 top division titles.
- 19 May – The Speaker of the House of Commons, Michael Martin, announces his resignation from the office after coming under criticism for his handling of the ongoing expenses row.
- 20 May – Labour peers Lord Taylor of Blackburn and Lord Truscott are suspended from Parliament for six months each having been found guilty of breaching the code of conduct and also failing to act on their personal honour. The suspensions came about as a result of the 2009 cash for influence scandal and are the first such actions since 1642.
- 21 May – Following a long campaign by Gurkha veterans who served in the British Armed Forces before 1997, Home Secretary Jacqui Smith announces that all Gurkha veterans who have served four years or more in the British Army before 1997 will be allowed to settle in Britain.
- 22 May – Whitelee Wind Farm, the largest onshore wind farm in Europe, officially opens in Scotland.
- 27 May – Manchester United lose 2–0 to FC Barcelona of Spain in the European Cup final at Rome's Olympic Stadium.
- 30 May – Chelsea win the FA Cup for the fifth time after beating Everton 2–1 in the final at Wembley Stadium. Everton French striker Louis Saha scores the fastest ever FA Cup Final goal, after 23 seconds

=== June ===
- 1 June – An Ipsos MORI opinion poll suggests the Conservatives are on course for a landslide election victory, with 40% of those polled saying they would vote for the party. Labour and the Liberal Democrats stand 22% behind the Conservatives, both being supported by 18% of respondents. Minority parties, including the British National Party and UK Independence Party appear to be enjoying a surge in support, alongside the Scottish and Welsh nationalists.
- 2 June
  - The Home Secretary, Jacqui Smith, confirms she will leave the Cabinet in the next reshuffle, expected after the forthcoming local and European elections. It is also announced that the Cabinet Office Minister, Tom Watson and the Minister for Children, Beverley Hughes are to leave government.
  - The Labour Party bars four of its MPs from standing at the next general election. Elliot Morley, Ian Gibson, David Chaytor and Margaret Moran had come under scrutiny in the MPs expenses scandal.
- 3 June – The Secretary of State for Communities and Local Government, Hazel Blears, resigns from the Cabinet, placing increased pressure on the Prime Minister, Gordon Brown.
- 4 June
  - 2009 European Parliament election: Labour suffer a significant drop in support, losing 5 seats and being pushed from second to third place in vote share by the Eurosceptic UKIP, while the Conservatives also enjoy an increase in support, and the far-right BNP gain 2 seats, their first ever in the European Parliament.
  - 2009 local elections: In further poor results for the Labour Party, all 4 remaining councils under their control fall to the Conservative Party's control. The Conservatives achieve 38% of the vote, the Liberal Democrats 28% and Labour 23%.
- 5 June – In the aftermath of yesterday's election results, Prime Minister Gordon Brown reshuffles his cabinet amidst some pressure on his leadership of the Labour Party.
- 8 June – Paedophile nursery worker Vanessa George is arrested on suspicion of child sex abuse in connection to the 2009 Plymouth child abuse case
- 9 June
  - Newly elected MEP and leader of the British National Party Nick Griffin is forced to abandon a press conference outside the Houses of Parliament after being ambushed by protesters.
  - Unemployment in Britain is now standing at a 14-year high of 2.22 million and the quarterly rise in unemployment is the highest for 28 years.
- 14 June
  - The first death in the United Kingdom related to the 2009 swine flu pandemic is confirmed by the Scottish Government at 20:30 BST. There will eventually be 474 confirmed deaths in the UK.
  - The Big Top 40 Show is the first real-time chart show ever to be broadcast in the United Kingdom, consisting of downloads and airplay. The show is broadcast on 142 stations – the largest number of stations that a radio show is broadcast on in the UK.
- 15 June
  - Prime Minister Gordon Brown announces an independent inquiry into events surrounding the Iraq War.
  - The Calman Commission recommends that the Scottish Parliament be given greater control over tax and legislation such as setting speed limits.
- 16 June
  - The long-awaited Digital Britain report is published. It makes a number of recommendations with regard to broadband access, internet use and public broadcasting.
  - An official inquiry begins into the MPs expenses scandal, conducted by The Committee on Standards in Public Life.
- 18 June – MPs' expenses are published online by Parliamentary authorities, but the decision to black out many of the details leads to criticism.
- 21 June – The final British Grand Prix (providing Donington Park is prepared on time) to be held at the Silverstone Circuit is won by Sebastian Vettel. Britain's Jenson Button and Lewis Hamilton finish 6th and 16th respectively.
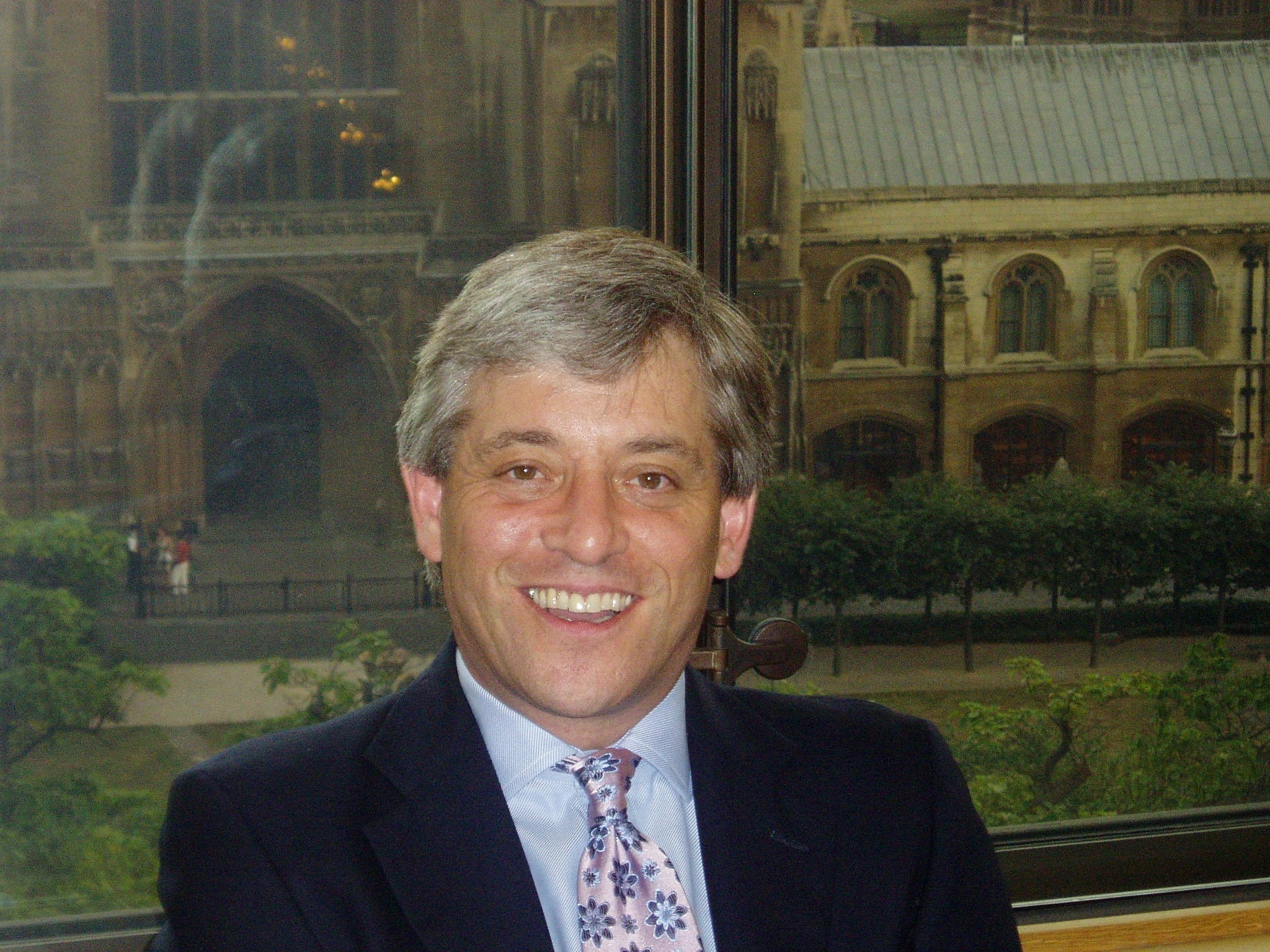
  The newly elected Speaker of the House of Commons, John Bercow.
- 22 June – Conservative MP John Bercow is elected as the 157th Speaker of the House of Commons.
- 25 June – The BBC publishes the expenses of some of its top executives. Among the information to be revealed is that the corporation's Director General Mark Thompson claimed over £2,000 after cutting short his holiday in October 2008 to deal with the row over The Russell Brand Show phone calls controversy.

=== July ===
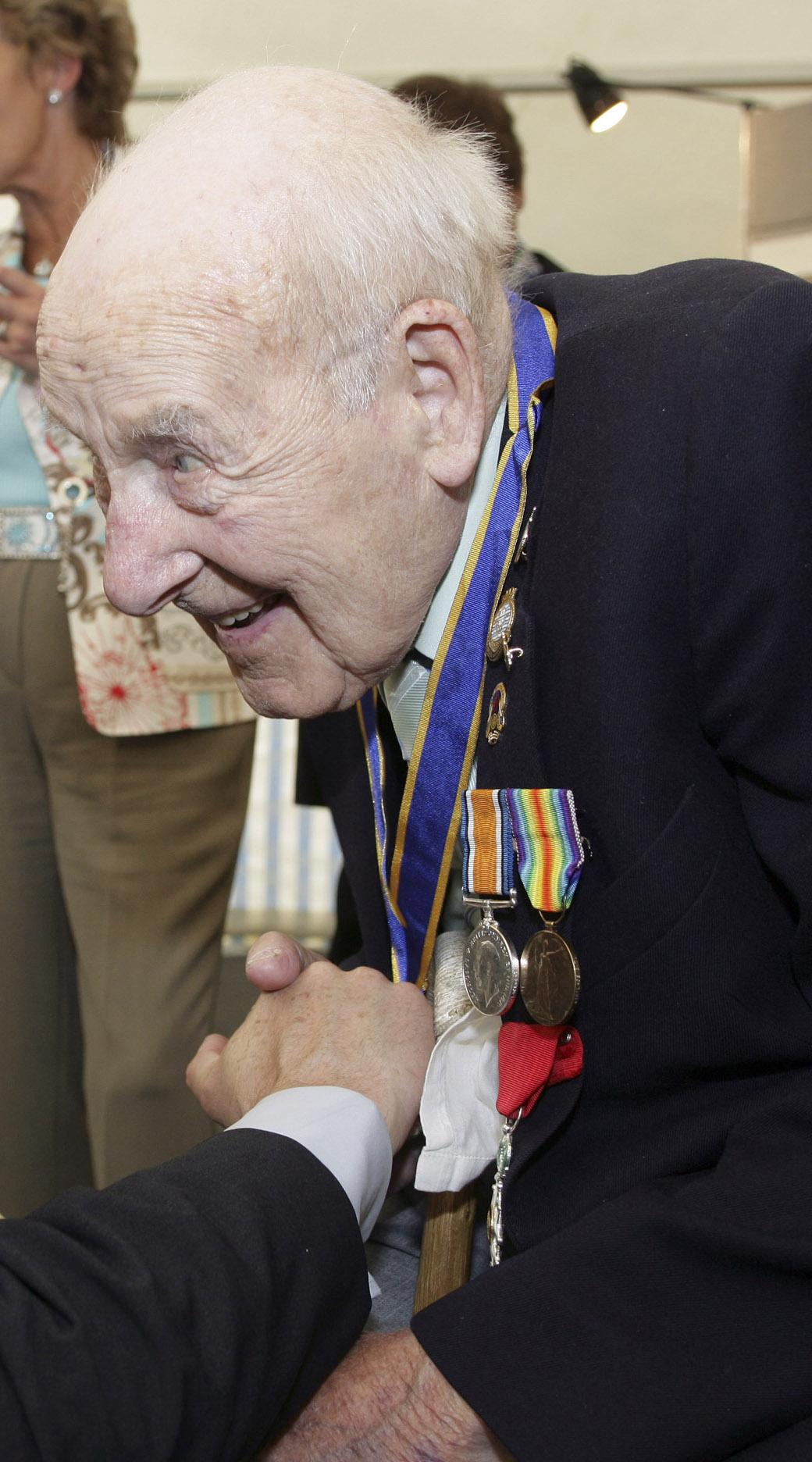

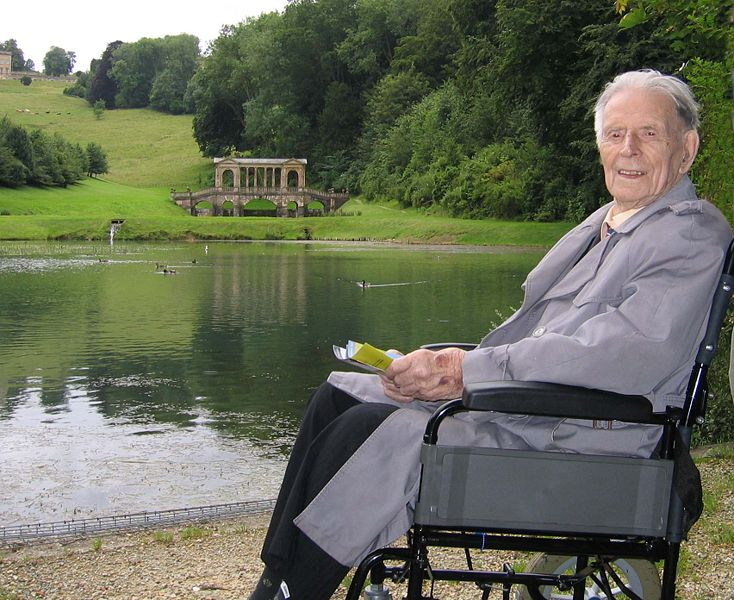
Britain's last two Army veterans of World War I. Top: Henry Allingham, the oldest man in the world and one of the last surviving veterans of World War I, who died on 18 July aged 113. Above: Harry Patch, the last British Army veteran of World War I, who died on 25 July aged 111.

- 1 July
  - Two British soldiers are killed in an explosion in Afghanistan. It is later confirmed that one of the casualties is Lieutenant Colonel Rupert Thorneloe, the most senior ranking officer to be killed in action since Colonel H. Jones during the Falklands campaign.
  - The government announces that it is taking the InterCity East Coast franchise into a period of public ownership, after the incumbent operator, National Express East Coast, said it planned to default on its franchise agreement.
  - Elizabeth Cross instituted for award to the next of kin of members of the armed forces killed in action (or as the result of terrorism) since World War II.
- 5 July – The Staffordshire Hoard, the largest haul of Anglo-Saxon treasure ever found, is uncovered. The 1,500 gold and silver pieces are discovered buried beneath a field in Staffordshire by metal detecting enthusiast Terry Herbert. This is made public on 24 September.
- 8 July
  - The Guardian claims that rival English newspaper, the Rupert Murdoch-owned News of the World tabloid, paid £1 million in court costs after its journalists were accused of involvement in phone tapping celebrities and politicians.
  - The First Test of the 2009 Ashes series takes place in Cardiff's SWALEC Stadium
- 11 July – The UK announces that 8 British soldiers are killed in Afghanistan, the country's worst death toll in a 24-hour period.
- 14 July – BBC Trust chairman Sir Michael Lyons announces that bonuses for the 10 most senior BBC executives will be suspended indefinitely.
- 15 July – Unemployment figures show the jobless total in Britain now stands at 2.38 million, a level not seen since 1995.
- 16 July – ITV announces that its news and information Teletext service will be discontinued within the next six months as a result of mounting losses and the inability to find a viable business model to continue.
- 18 July – Henry Allingham, the world's oldest man and one of the last surviving First World War servicemen, dies aged 113.
- 21 July – The first race meeting is held at Ffos Las racecourse in south Wales, the first new National Hunt racing course to be built in the UK for eighty years.
- 22 July – Cardiff City F.C. move into their new Cardiff City Stadium, a 27,000-capacity, all-seater venue, after 99 years at Ninian Park.
- 23 July
  - The Government launches the National Pandemic Flu Service across England, a website and phoneline allowing people who think they have the pandemic H1N1/09 virus to bypass the NHS to obtain antiviral drugs. The website crashes within hours of its launch due to the overwhelming demand.
  - 2009 Norwich North by-election: The Conservatives gain the seat with a majority of more than 7,000, making their candidate, 27-year-old Chloe Smith the youngest MP in the UK. The election has been held following the resignation of Labour's Ian Gibson over the MPs expenses row earlier in the year.
- 25 July – Harry Patch, the last British survivor of the First World War trenches and briefly the oldest man in the United Kingdom, dies at the age of 111. Claude Choules, a 108-year-old former Royal Navy serviceman who was born in Worcestershire but now lives in Australia, is the last surviving British veteran of the war and one of just three surviving of any nationality.
- 28 July – The International Rugby Board confirms that the United Kingdom has won the rights to stage both the 2013 Rugby League and the 2015 Rugby Union World Cups.
- 30 July – Debbie Purdy who has multiple sclerosis makes legal history by winning her battle to have the law on assisted suicide in England and Wales clarified after the Law Lords rule in her favour.
- 31 July
  - British Airways losses £148m in the last three months, the company's first loss since privatisation in 1987.
  - Gary McKinnon, a British man with Asperger syndrome loses his latest High Court bid to avoid extradition to the United States to face charges of hacking into US Government computers.

=== August ===
- 4 August – Dr Sarah Wollaston is chosen by open primary election as the Conservative Party candidate for Totnes for the 2010 general election, the first time such a mechanism has been used to pick an election candidate in the UK. This follows the decision of the incumbent, Anthony Steen, to step down in the wake of the Parliamentary expenses scandal.
- 6 August – Great Train Robber Ronnie Biggs, who is gravely ill, is granted release from prison on compassionate grounds.
- 8 August – The Conservatives are reported to be studying plans for VAT to be increased to 20% if they win the general election, as part of an emergency package to cut national debt.
- 12 August
  - Wales begins the process of digital switchover with the turning off of parts of the analogue signal from the Kilvey Hill transmitting station in Swansea.
  - New figures show unemployment now stands at 2.44 million, the highest level for almost 15 years.
- 14 August – Britain imposes direct rule on the Turks and Caicos Islands after an inquiry found evidence of government corruption.
- 15 August – The number of British Forces personnel killed in Afghanistan since operations began in 2001 reaches 200 after the Ministry of Defence announces the death of a trooper who had been wounded in a roadside attack two days earlier.
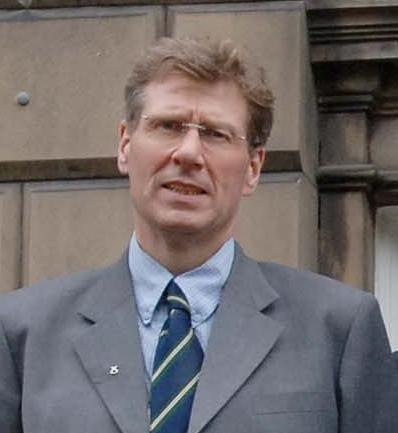
  Scottish Justice Secretary Kenny MacAskill, who made the decision to release Abdelbaset al-Megrahi on compassionate grounds.
- 20 August – The Scottish justice secretary Kenny MacAskill grants release to the convicted Lockerbie bomber Abdelbaset al-Megrahi on compassionate grounds, stating that Megrahi is in the final stages of terminal prostate cancer.
- 23 August – In cricket, the Ashes series concludes with England defeating Australia 2–1.
- August – A metal detectorist discovers the Shrewsbury Hoard, about 10,000 Roman coins.

=== September ===
- 7 September – Convictions and acquittals in the trial for those charged over the 2006 transatlantic aircraft plot.
- 8 September – The Police Service of Northern Ireland find and defuse a 600 lb bomb in South Armagh after searching the area for almost a week.
- 9 September – Westcountry Television completes the digital switchover process with the turning off of all analogue signals from the Caradon Hill transmitter.
- 14 September – Those convicted for their role in the 2006 transatlantic aircraft plot are sentenced.
- 17 September – Three members of the CIRA are jailed in Northern Ireland for 15 years each for having a live Mortar Bomb. Riots break out in Lurgan, County Armagh as a consequence. Cars are hijacked and placed on the railway lines disrupting services between Northern Ireland and the Republic of Ireland. The riots continue for three days and there are reports of masked gunmen roaming the streets.
- 29 September – Britain's biggest selling newspaper, The Sun, withdraws its support for the Labour Party and gives its backing to the Conservatives. The announcement comes shortly after Gordon Brown delivered his keynote speech to the 2009 Labour Party Conference, and on the same day that Ipsos MORI place Labour in third position, behind both the Conservatives and the Liberal Democrats, in their latest opinion poll.

=== October ===
- 1 October – The Supreme Court of the United Kingdom officially opens, taking over various powers, including those of the Law Lords.
- 6 October – Shadow Chancellor George Osborne unveils plans for cutting national debt if the Conservatives win the forthcoming general election. These include increasing the retirement age for men to 66 from 2016, a decade sooner than planned by the current Labour government, as well as increasing the retirement age for women to 65 by 2020.
- 8 October – Postal workers vote three to one in favour of taking strike action over job security and working conditions.
- 12 October
  - The government announces a £16bn assets sale in an attempt to raise funds to reduce the budget deficit. The Dartford Crossing and the state-owned bookmaker The Tote will be included in the sale.
  - The independent audit of MPs expenses chaired by Sir Thomas Legg is completed. Among those who must repay claimed expenses is Prime Minister Gordon Brown who claimed £12,415 for cleaning and gardening costs.
  - Reports state that United Kingdom has the worst quality of life in Europe, due to long hours, bad weather, low life expectancy and the high price of many consumer goods (as a result of the recession).
  - The Evening Standard becomes a free newspaper in central London.
- 16 October – A bomb detonates under the car belonging to a police officer's wife in the large Unionist area of East Belfast. The woman is taken to hospital with minor injuries as the bomb was set to go off in the passenger side where her husband usually sits but is not present on this day. The Real IRA later claim responsibility
- 18 October – Great Britain's Jenson Button wins the 2009 Formula One World Drivers' Championship after finishing in fifth place at the Brazilian Grand Prix. British based team Brawn GP, who Button drives for, secures the Constructors' Championship at the same race, in their debut season.
- 20 October – The latest MORI poll shows Conservative support at 43% – 17 points ahead of Labour. This showing, if translated into votes at an election, would see the Tories form the next government.
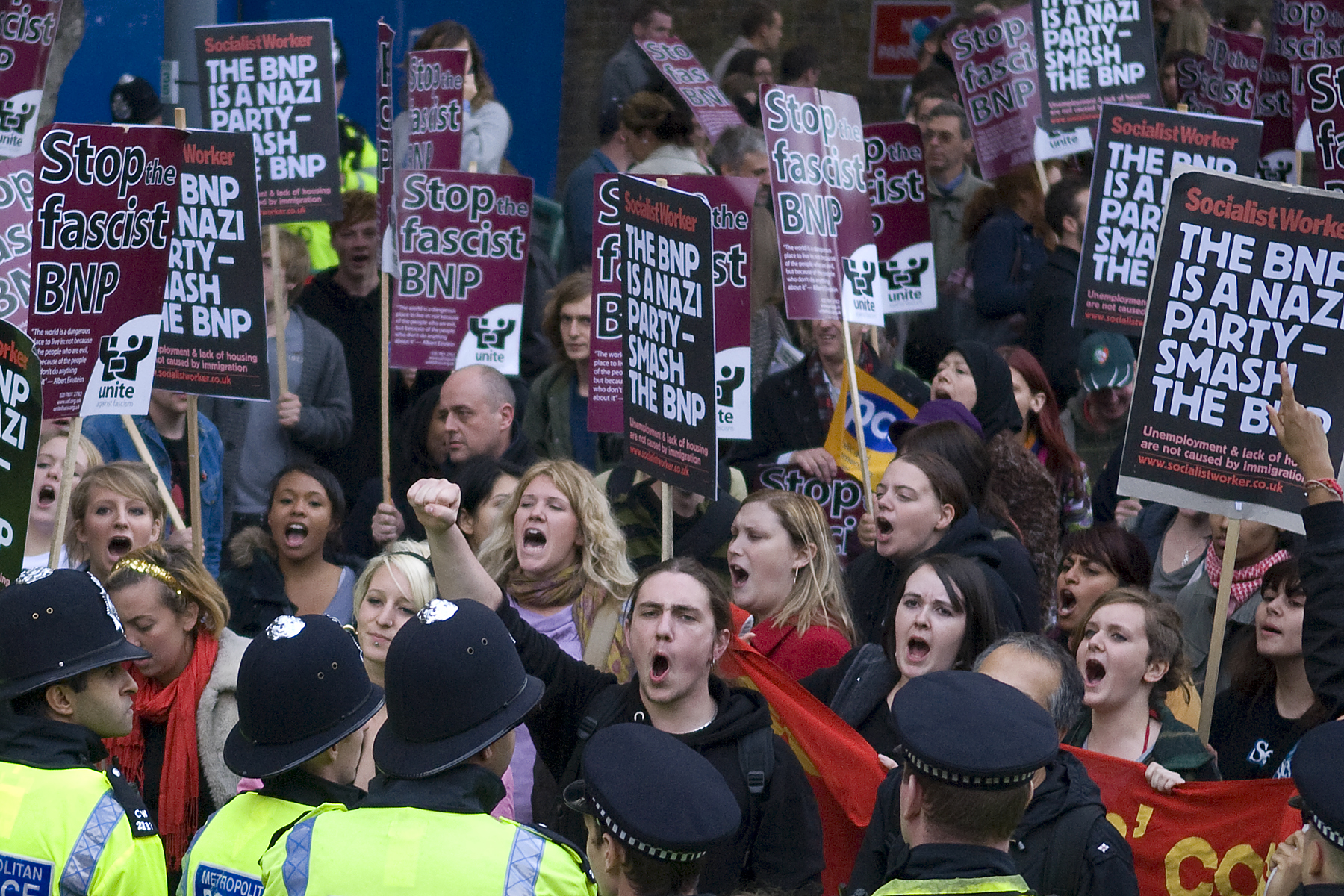
  A crowd protests BNP Leader Nick Griffin's appearance on the BBC show Question Time.
- 22 October – British National Party leader Nick Griffin makes a controversial first appearance on the BBC One political debate programme Question Time. He later announces his intention to make a formal complaint to the BBC for the way he believed he was treated by the programme's audience, who he described as a "lynch mob" and the show's other guests.
- 24 October – Great Britain finish top of the table in both medals won and number of gold medals at the 2009 IPC Swimming European Championships at Reykjavík, Iceland.
- 25 October – It is reported that the Crown Office of Scotland has emailed relatives of British victims of the Lockerbie Disaster to inform them that a police review of the case has started now that "appeal proceedings" have ended.

=== November ===
- 4 November
  - Five British soldiers are shot dead in Afghanistan's Helmand Province while mentoring and training Afghan police. Six other British servicemen and two Aghan police are also injured in the attack which the UK military blames on a "rogue" policeman.
  - General Motors, the owner of British carmaker Vauxhall and its continental Opel partner, makes a surprise decision not to sell the carmaker to Canadian organisation Magna.
  - Granada Television begins the process of digital switchover.
- 12 November
  - 2009 Glasgow North East by-election: Labour's Willie Bain wins with a majority of 8,111. The by-election was called following the resignation of MP and former Speaker Michael Martin.
  - Coroners and Justice Act passed. Amongst other provisions, it abolishes the anachronistic offences of sedition, and seditious, defamatory and obscene libel; and criminalises the holding of someone in slavery or servitude. It abolishes the office of Coroner of the Queen's Household and creates the office of Chief Coroner of England and Wales.
- 14 November – Severe gales and heavy rain from an Atlantic storm cause floods and damage across southern England and Wales.
- 19 November – The highest ever UK 24-hour rainfall total, 314.4 mm, is recorded at Seathwaite Farm, Cumbria – a record which stands until December 2015.
- 20 November – Many towns and villages in Cumbria and Dumfries and Galloway are flooded following several days of heavy rain. Three bridges collapse, one of them leading to the death of a police officer standing on the bridge when it collapsed.
- 22 November – The latest MORI poll shows that the Conservatives are just six points ahead of Labour, their narrowest lead for two years, with 37% of the vote, which, if translated into election results, would force a hung parliament. Nick Clegg, leader of the Liberal Democrats, has suggested his party would support the Tories if the election resulted in no overall majority.
- November – With an average nationwide precipitation of 215.7 millimetres or 8.49 inches, this is the wettest calendar month over the United Kingdom as a whole since reliable records begin in 1910.

=== December ===
- 2 December – The Winter Hill transmitting station has its remaining analogue signals turned off, completing the digital switchover process in the Granada Television region.
- 7 December – The Ministry of Defence announces the death in Afghanistan of a soldier from 1st Battalion The Royal Anglian Regiment, taking the total number of British troops killed there in 2009 to 100 and the total number of British soldiers killed in Afghanistan since the conflict began (October 2001) to 237.
- 11 December – New Vauxhall Astra hits showrooms after its worldwide debut at the Frankfurt Motor Show.
- 14 December – Cabin crew at British Airways vote overwhelmingly in favour of a planned 12 days of strike action over Christmas and the New Year in a dispute over job cuts and changes to staff contracts. On 17 December the High Court rules that Unite, the representing trade union, had not correctly balloted its members on the strike action, meaning that the strikes could not go ahead.
- 15 December – Paedophile nursery worker Vanessa George is jailed indefinitely after previously admitting to seven sexual assaults and six counts of making and distributing indecent pictures of children.
- 16 December
  - Scotland's largest airline, Flyglobespan, goes into administration.
  - ITV closes its news and information service on Teletext, leaving the ITV channel(s) without such a service for the first time in 35 years.
  - The England 2018 FIFA World Cup bidding team announce the 12 cities which will be part of their campaign to host the tournament. Wembley Stadium, Arsenal's Emirates Stadium, Manchester United's Old Trafford and Liverpool's Anfield or proposed new stadium are among the venues, as is the Stadium:mk in Milton Keynes which opened only in 2007.
  - The latest unemployment figures show that UK unemployment is slowing, but now stands at the highest figure for 15 years – almost 2.5 million, equating to 8% of the workforce. The number of people claiming unemployment benefit, however, fell to 1.63 million in October, the first fall for nearly two years. Youth unemployment has increased to 952,000 – the highest level since records began 17 years ago.
- 18 December
  - Heavy snowfall causes widespread disruption across large parts of South East England, East Anglia, the East Midlands and Yorkshire and the Humber.
  - After 27 years, Sir Terry Wogan presents his final breakfast show on BBC Radio 2.
- 20 December – The last MORI poll of the decade shows the Tories 17 points ahead of Labour on 43%, pointing towards a landslide and their first election win since 1992.
- 21 December – The leaders of the three main UK political parties agree to stage the first ever live televised election debates ahead of the 2010 general election.
- 29 December – Akmal Shaikh becomes the first EU native to be executed in China in 50 years. Gordon Brown releases a statement indicating that he is appalled.
- 30 December
  - British hostage Peter Moore is released alive in Iraq following over two and a half years of captivity in Iraq and Iran.
  - Three climbers are killed following three large avalanches in Scotland.

=== Undated ===
- More than 80% of the UK population (some 50 million people) now has internet access.
- New car sales drop to just under 2 million after exceeding 2.5 million in 2008, although the recession's effect on new car sales is eased by the scrappage scheme. The Ford Fiesta is Britain's best selling car, while the new version of the MINI (produced by BMW) is Britain's seventh best selling car with almost 40,000 sales. The new Vauxhall Insignia is Britain's ninth best selling car, while carmakers including Kia and Hyundai buck the trend of falling new car sales by increasing their market share largely due to the popularity of their cars with buyers taking advantage of the scrappage scheme.

== Publications ==
- A. S. Byatt's semi-biographical novel The Children's Book (awarded the James Tait Black Memorial Prize in fiction).
- Hilary Mantel's historical novel Wolf Hall (awarded the Man Booker Prize).
- Christopher Reid's poetry A Scattering (awarded the 2009 Costa Book Awards Book of the Year)

== Births ==
- 22 February – Archie Yates, actor
- 5 December – Owen Cooper, actor

== Deaths ==
=== January ===
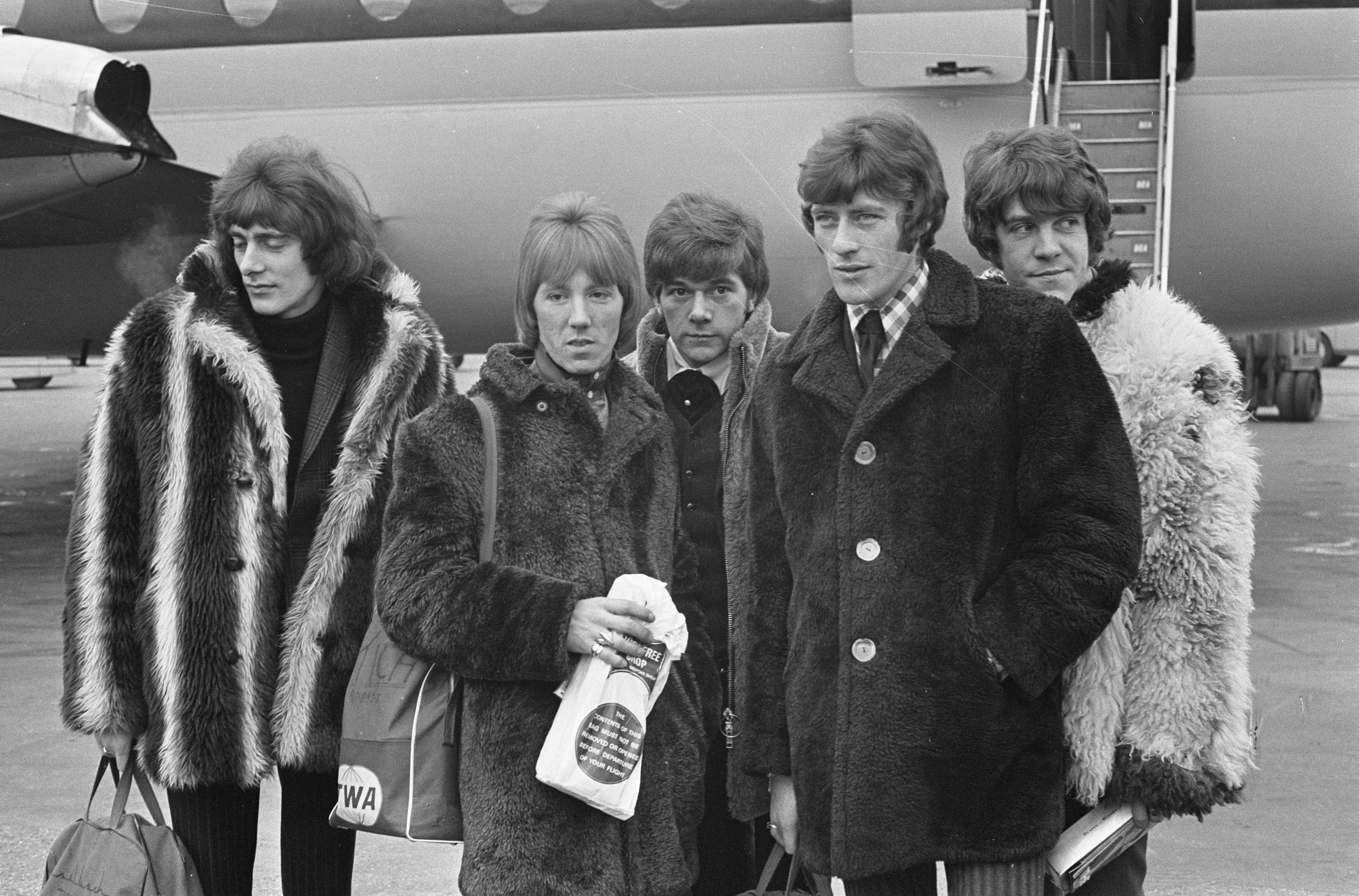
Dave Dee (far right)

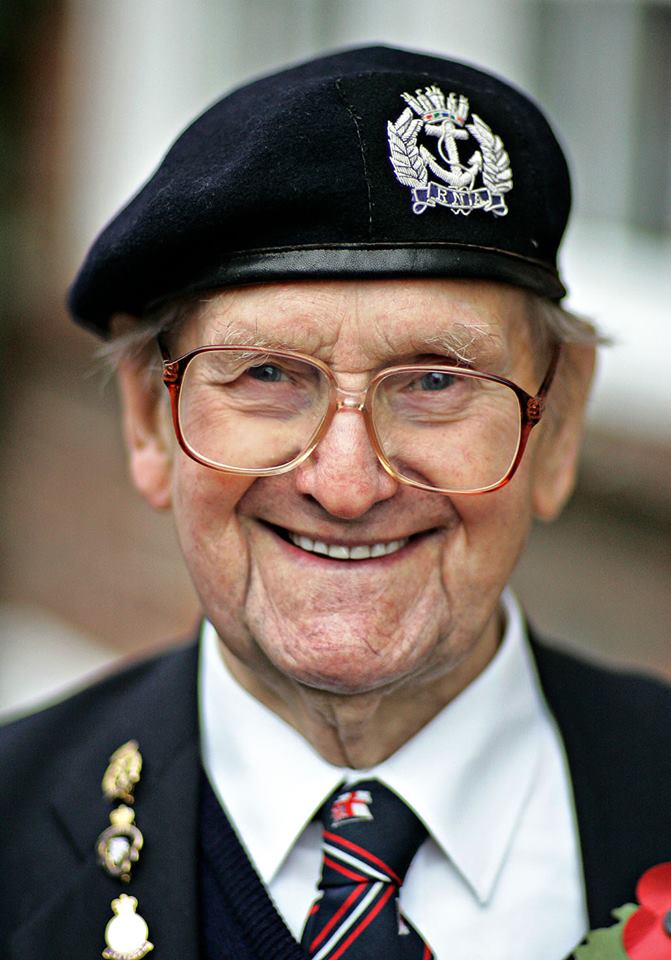
Bill Stone

- 1 January – Edmund Purdom, actor (b. 1926)
- 3 January – Sir Alan Walters, economist (b. 1926)
- 9 January
  - Dave Dee, singer/songwriter (b. 1941)
  - T. Llew Jones, Welsh-language writer (b. 1915)
  - David Smiley, Army colonel (b. 1916)
- 10 January
  - Rob Gauntlett, record-breaking climber (b. 1987)
  - Bill Stone, sailor, veteran of World Wars I and II (b. 1900)
- 11 January
  - Bert Hazell, politician, MP for North Norfolk (1964–1970), oldest former MP (b. 1907)
  - Vivian Ridler, printer and typographer (b. 1913)
  - David Vine, television presenter (b. 1935)
- 13 January – Sir Dai Llweellyn, Bt., socialite (b. 1946)
- 14 January – Angela Morley (formerly Wally Stott), composer and conductor (b. 1924)
- 16 January – Sir John Mortimer, barrister, author and dramatist (b. 1923)
- 17 January – Edmund Leopold de Rothschild, financier (b. 1916)
- 18 January – Tony Hart, artist and television presenter (b. 1925)
- 20 January – Sheila Walsh, romantic novelist (b. 1928)
- 24 January
  - Reg Gutteridge, boxing commentator (b. 1924)
  - Diane Holland, actress (b. 1930)
  - John Buchan Ross, Royal Air Force officer (b. 1912)
- 27 January – Michael Majerus, geneticist (b. 1954)
- 29 January
  - Bill Frindall, cricket statistician (b. 1939)
  - John Martyn, singer/songwriter (b. 1948)

=== February ===
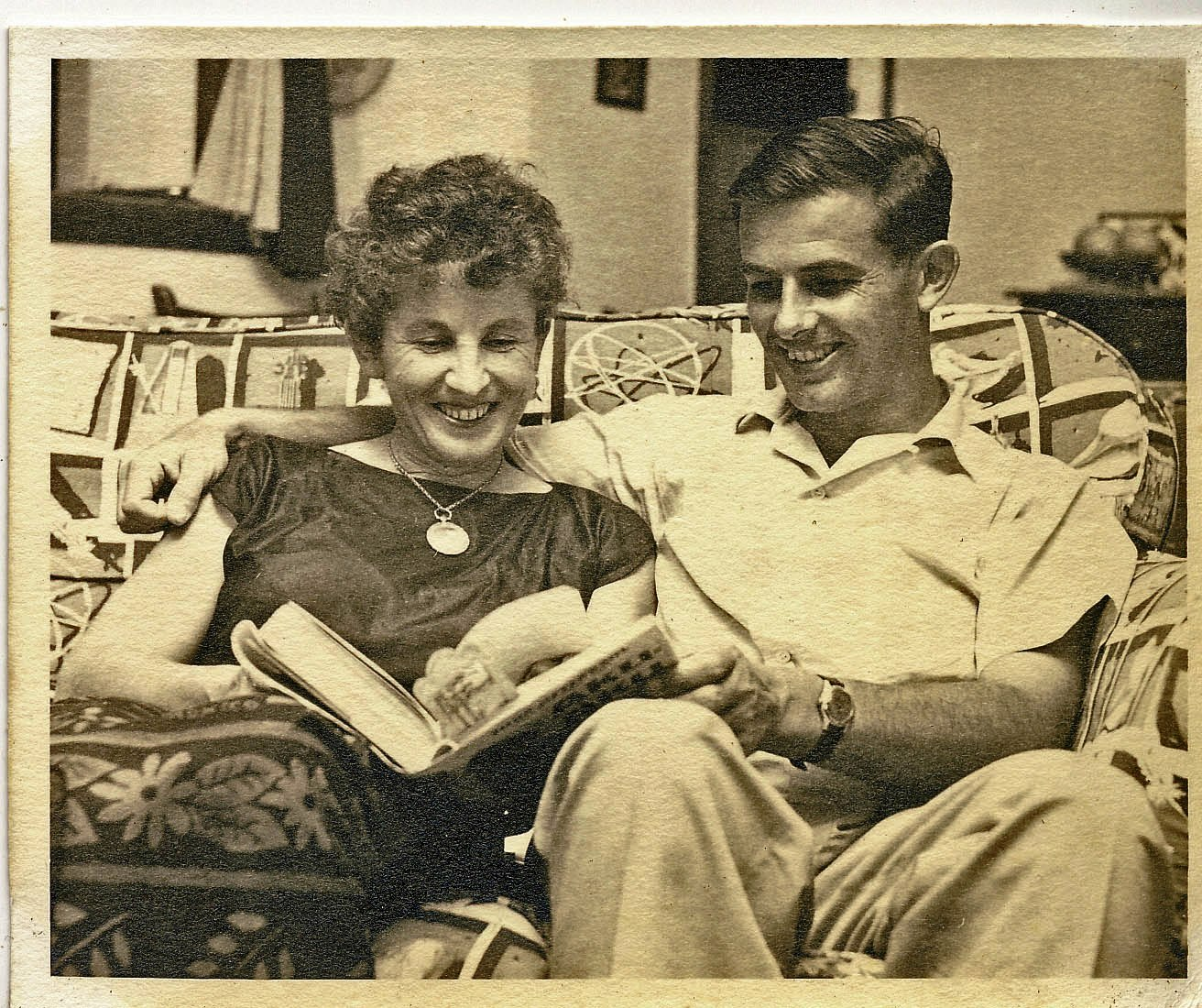
David Snow with his wife

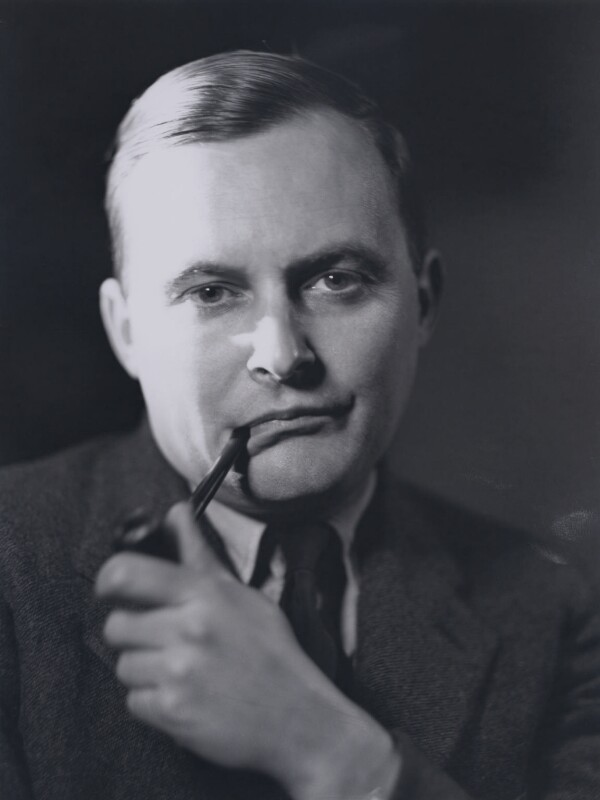
Edward Upward

- 1 February
  - Tim Grundy, radio and television presenter (b. 1958)
  - Sir Alan Muir Wood, civil engineer (b. 1921)
- 2 February – Paul Birch, footballer (b. 1962)
- 4 February – David Snow, ornithologist (b. 1924)
- 7 February – Sir George Godber, physician and public servant, Chief Medical Officer (1960–1973) (b. 1908)
- 8 February
  - Francis Dennis Ramsay, portrait painter (b. 1925)
  - Terry Spencer, RAF fighter pilot and war photographer (b. 1918)
- 13 February
  - Dilys Laye, actress (b. 1934)
  - Edward Upward, writer (b. 1903)
- 14 February – Bernard Ashley, businessman (b. 1926)
- 17 February – Victor Kiernan, historian (b. 1913)
- 19 February – Kelly Groucutt, bass guitar player (Electric Light Orchestra) (b. 1945)
- 24 February – Edward Judd, actor (b. 1932, China)
- 25 February – Ian Carr, jazz musician and writer (b. 1933)
- 26 February – Wendy Richard, actress (b. 1943)
- 27 February
  - Alastair McCorquodale, cricketer and athlete (b. 1925)
  - John Francis Marchment Middleton, anthropologist (b. 1921)
  - Geoffrey Smith, gardener and broadcaster (b. 1928)

=== March ===
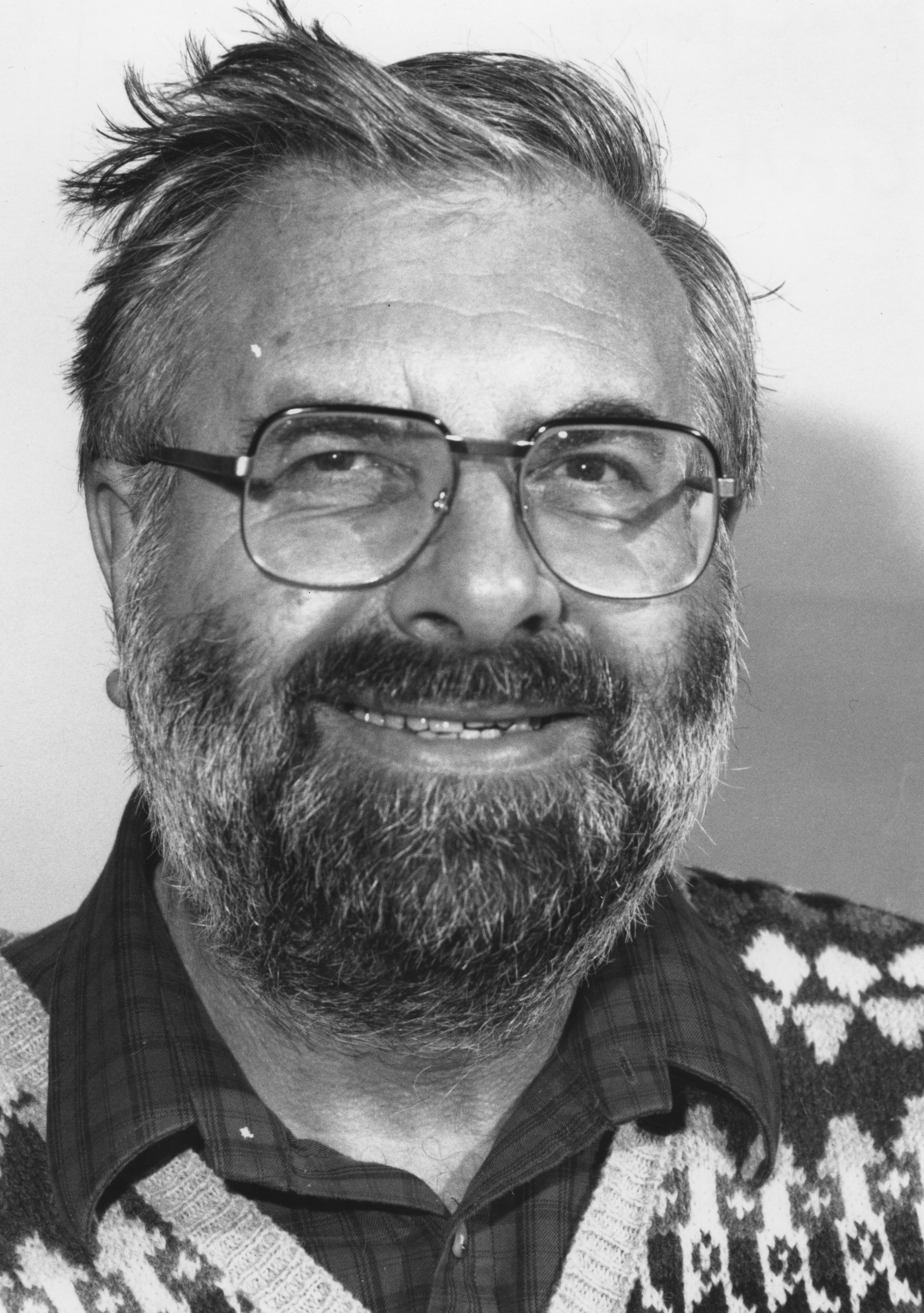
Brian Barry

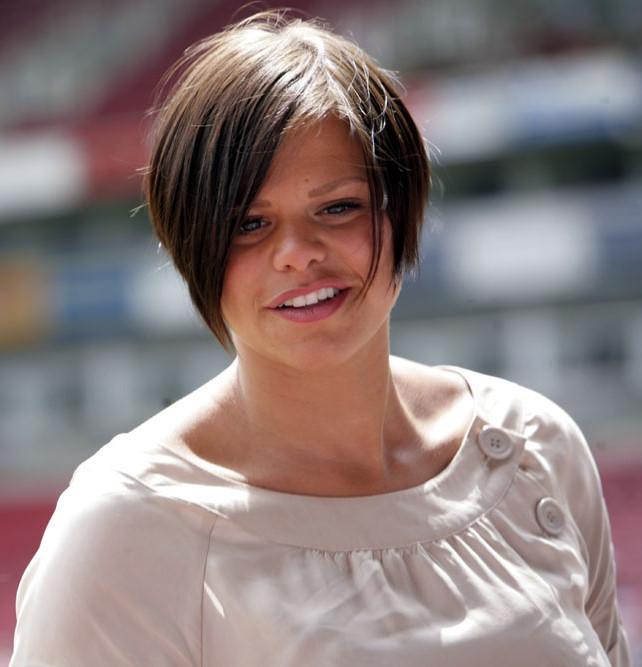
Jade Goody

- 1 March – Joan Turner, actress and singer (b. 1922)
- 3 March – Barbara Wright, translator (b. 1915)
- 5 March – Francis Essex, television producer (b. 1929)
- 8 March – Ali Bongo, magician (b. 1929)
- 10 March
  - Brian Barry, philosopher (b. 1936)
  - Derek Benfield, actor (b. 1926)
- 12 March – David Wood, Army colonel and World War II veteran (b. 1923)
- 18 March – Natasha Richardson, actress (b. 1963)
- 21 March – Winifred Foley, writer (b. 1914)
- 22 March
  - Jade Goody, television celebrity (b. 1981)
  - John L. Harper, biologist (b. 1925)
  - Geoffrey Sherman, Royal Marines officer (b. 1915)
- 24 March – Tim Brinton, broadcaster and politician (b. 1929)
- 26 March
  - Edmund Lawson, barrister (b. 1948)
  - John Mayhew, drummer (Genesis) (b. 1947)
  - Bob Scott, ornithologist (b. 1938)
- 28 March – Hugh Kelly, footballer (Blackpool) (b. 1923)
- 31 March – Michael Cox, novelist (b. 1948)

=== April ===
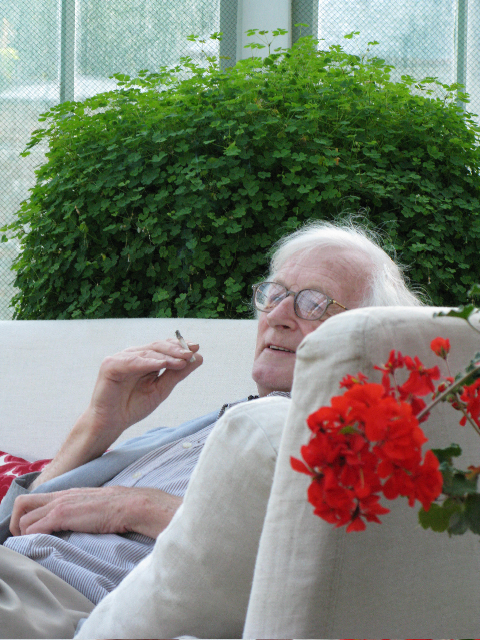
John Michell

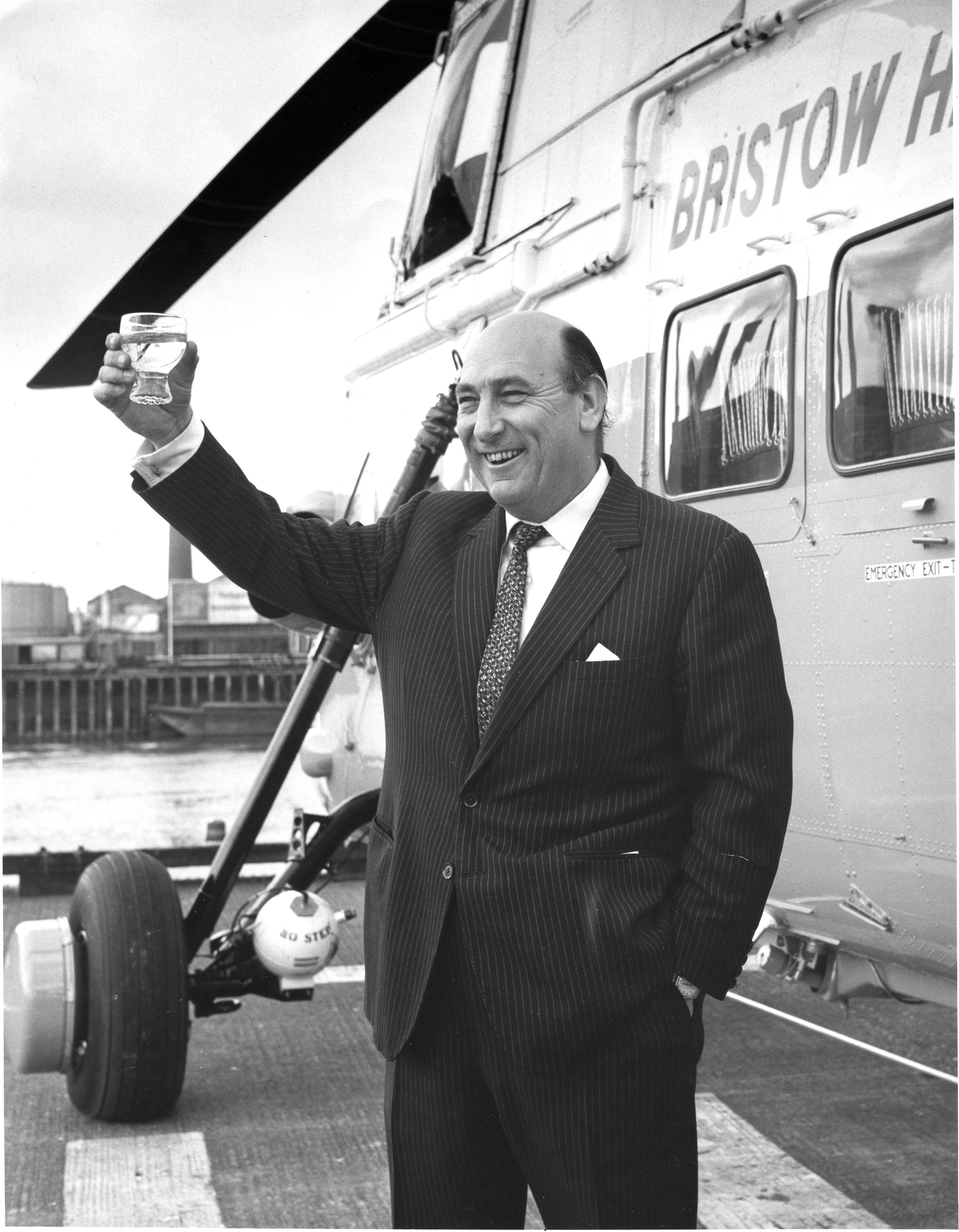
Alan Bristow

- 1 April – Paul Dean, Baron Dean of Harptree, politician, Deputy Speaker of the House of Commons (1982–1992) (b. 1924)
- 5 April
  - Sir Michael Giddings, RAF air marshal (b. 1920)
  - I. J. Good, cryptologist (b. 1916)
  - Sir Neil MacCormick, lawyer and politician (b. 1941)
- 8 April – Lennie Bennett, comedian and television presenter (b. 1938)
- 10 April – Richard Arnell, composer (b. 1917)
- 11 April – Simon Channing Williams, film producer (b. 1945)
- 12 April
  - John Maddox, biologist and science writer (b. 1925)
  - William Stanhope, 11th Earl of Harrington, peer (b. 1922)
- 14 April – Peter Rogers, film producer (b. 1914)
- 15 April – Sir Clement Freud, writer, broadcaster, politician and chef (b. 1924)
- 18 April
  - Peter Dennis, actor (b. 1933)
  - Edward George, Baron George, financier, Governor of the Bank of England (1993–2003) (b. 1938)
- 19 April – J. G. Ballard, author (b. 1930)
- 21 April – Jack Jones, trade union leader (b. 1913)
- 22 April
  - Jack Cardiff, cinematographer and director (b. 1914)
  - Ken Annakin, director (b. 1914)
- 24 April
  - Margaret Gelling, toponymist (b. 1924)
  - John Michell, author (b. 1933)
- 26 April – Alan Bristow, businessman (b. 1923)
- 27 April – Edwin McClellan, Japanologist (b. 1925, Japan)
- 28 April – U. A. Fanthorpe, poet (b. 1929)
- 30 April
  - Maxime de la Falaise, model and actress (b. 1922)
  - Venetia Phair (née Burney), teacher who named the planet Pluto (b. 1918)

=== May ===
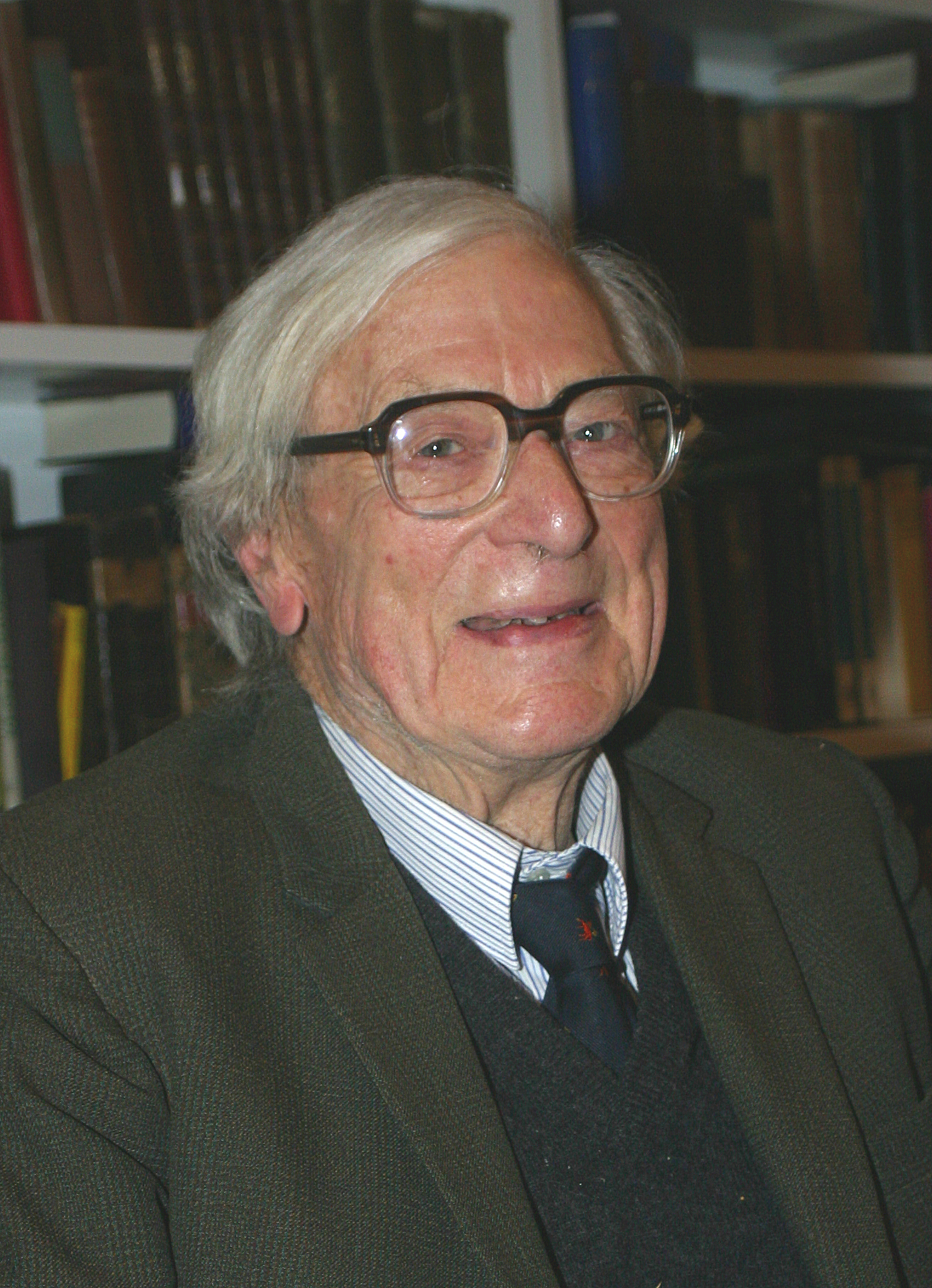
Norman Gash

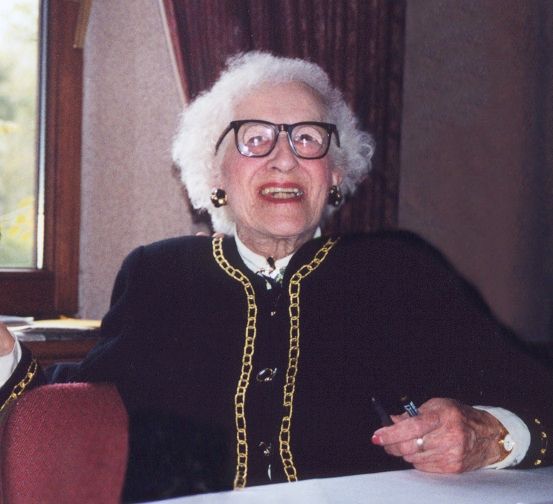
Millvina Dean

- 1 May – Norman Gash, historian (b. 1912, India)
- 7 May
  - Ian Cundy, Anglican prelate, Bishop of Peterborough (died in office) (b. 1945)
  - Tony Marsh, racing driver (b. 1931)
  - David Mellor, designer, manufacturer and retailer (b. 1930)
  - Wayland Young, 2nd Baron Kennet, writer and politician (b. 1923)
- 9 May
  - Cyril Hart, forestry expert (b. 1913)
  - Ernest Millington, politician, last surviving World War II MP (b. 1916)
- 10 May – James Kirkup, poet, translator and travel writer (b. 1918)
- 11 May – Pat Booth, model and writer (b. 1943)
- 13 May – Joe Tandy, racing driver and team owner (car crash) (b. 1983)
- 19 May – Nicholas Maw, composer (b. 1935)
- 20 May
  - Lucy Gordon, actress (b. 1980)
  - Simon Oates, actor (b. 1932)
- 23 May – Nicholas J. Phillips, physicist (b. 1933)
- 27 May – Clive Granger, econometrician (b. 1934)
- 28 May – Terence Alexander, actor (b. 1923)
- 31 May
  - Millvina Dean, last surviving RMS Titanic passenger (b. 1912)
  - Danny La Rue, entertainer (b. 1927)

=== June ===
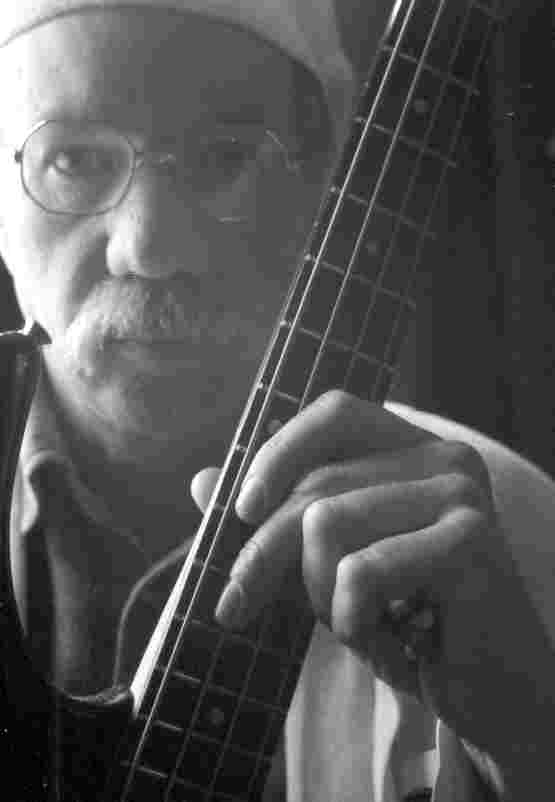
Hugh Hopper

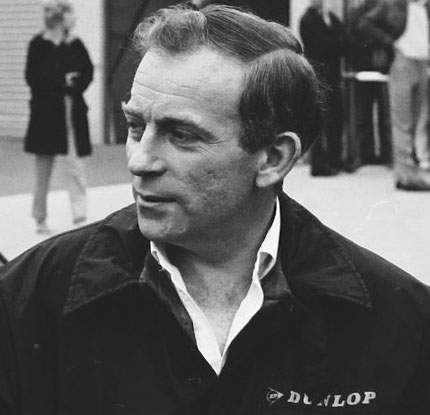
Peter Arundell

- 3 June – Peter Landin, computer scientist (b. 1930)
- 6 June – Charles Arnold-Baker, historian (b. 1918, Germany)
- 7 June
  - Hugh Hopper, prog rock and jazz fusion bass guitarist (b. 1945)
  - Peter Townsend, sociologist (b. 1928)
- 8 June – Matt Simpson, poet (b. 1936)
- 10 June – Tenniel Evans, actor (b. 1926)
- 11 June – Peter Wheeler, chemical engineer, owner of TVR (1981–2004) (b. 1944)
- 13 June – John Saville, Marxist historian (b. 1916)
- 16 June
  - Peter Arundell, racing driver (b. 1933)
  - Celia Fremlin, detective novelist (b. 1914)
- 17 June
  - Ralf Dahrendorf, sociologist and political scientist (b. 1929, and d., in Germany)
  - Patrick Dowling, television producer (b. 1919)
- 18 June – Sir Henry Hodge, solicitor and High Court judge (b. 1944)
- 19 June – Sir Derrick Bailey, baronet and cricketer (b. 1918)
- 20 June
  - Colin Bean, actor (b. 1927)
  - Godfrey Rampling, Olympic athlete (b. 1909)
- 22 June – Steve Race, pianist, composer and radio personality (b. 1921)
- 25 June – Brian Jones, poet (b. 1938)
- 27 June – Frank Barlow, historian (b. 1911)
- 30 June – Liam Fairhurst, charity fundraiser (b. 1995)

=== July ===
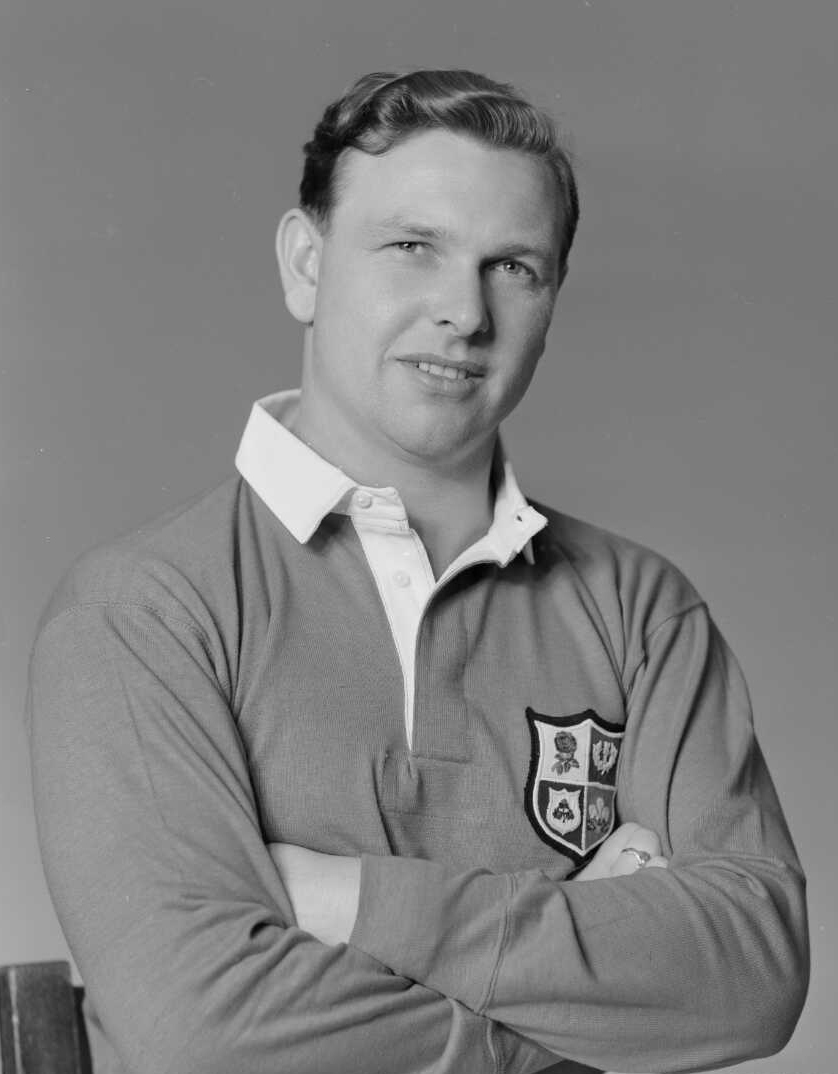
Bleddyn Williams

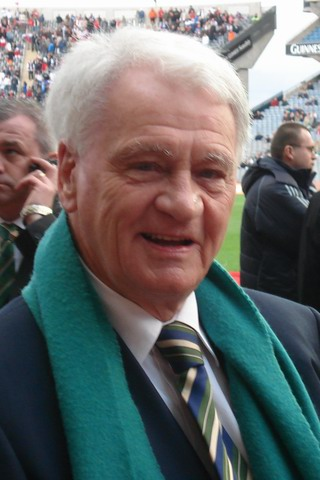
Sir Bobby Robson

- 1 July
  - David Pears, philosopher (b. 1921)
  - Mollie Sugden, actress (b. 1922)
- 2 July – David Morley, paediatrician (b. 1923)
- 4 July – Hugh Millais, actor and author (b. 1929)
- 6 July
  - Johnny Collins, folk singer (b. 1938)
  - Jim Reid, folk musician (b. 1934)
  - Bleddyn Williams, rugby union player (b. 1923)
- 8 July – Edgar O'Ballance, military journalist (b. 1918)
- 9 July – George Haig, 2nd Earl Haig, soldier and peer (b. 1918)
- 10 July – Sir Edward Downes, orchestral conductor (b. 1924)
- 12 July
  - James Klass, radio DJ (b. 1965)
  - Christopher Prout, Baron Kingsland, lawyer and politician (b. 1942)
- 13 July – Vince Powell, scriptwriter (b. 1928)
- 16 July – Ron G. Mason, oceanographer (b. 1916)
- 17 July
  - Leszek Kołakowski, philosopher (b. 1927, Poland)
  - Gordon Waller, musician (b. 1945)
- 18 July
  - Henry Allingham, World War I veteran and world's oldest living man (b. 1896)
  - Jill Balcon, actress and wife of Cecil Day-Lewis (b. 1925)
  - Denis Redman, Army major-general (b. 1910)
- 19 July – Henry Surtees, racing driver (accident) (b. 1991)
- 22 July – John Ryan, cartoonist, creator of Captain Pugwash (b. 1921)
- 24 July – Harry Towb, actor (b. 1925)
- 25 July
  - Ken Major, architect (b. 1928)
  - Stanley Middleton, novelist (b. 1919)
  - Harry Patch, World War I veteran and Europe's oldest living man (b. 1898)
- 31 July
  - Sir Bobby Robson, football manager (b. 1933)
  - Harry Alan Towers, screenwriter (b. 1920)

=== August ===
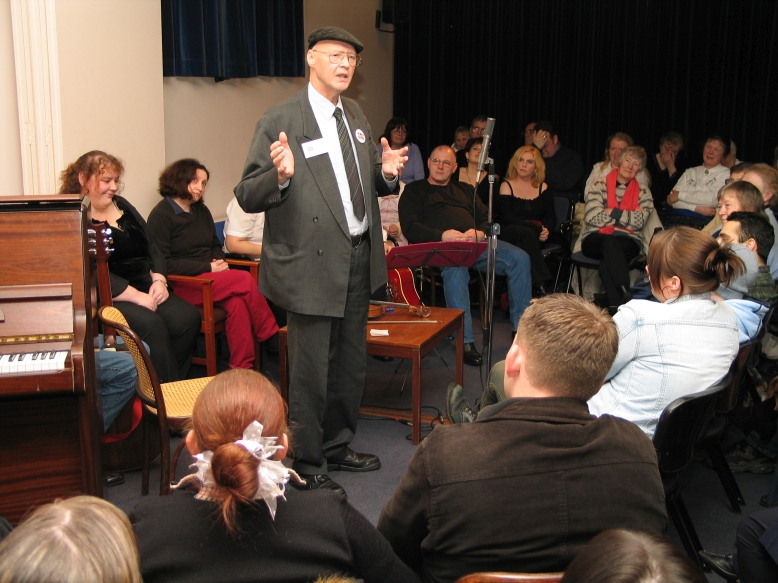
Stanley Robertson

- 2 August – Stanley Robertson, folk singer and storyteller (b. 1940)
- 3 August – Christopher Elrington, historian (b. 1930)
- 6 August
  - Helen Brotherton, conservationist (b. 1914)
  - Charles Townsend Harrison, art historian (b. 1942)
- 8 August – Harold Hitchcock, painter (b. 1914)
- 13 August – John Bentley, actor (b. 1916)
- 14 August – Frank Branston, journalist and Mayor of Bedford (died in office) (b. 1939)
- 15 August – John Stroud, television director (b. 1955)
- 16 August – Laurie Rowley, comedy writer (b. 1941)
- 19 August – Paul Ashbee, archaeologist (b. 1918)
- 21 August – Edward Goldsmith, environmentalist and philosopher (b. 1928)
- 26 August – Sadie Corré, actress and tap dancer (b. 1918)
- 29 August – Simon Dee, television interviewer and radio disc jockey (b. 1935)
- 31 August – Frederick Gore, artist (b. 1913)

=== September ===
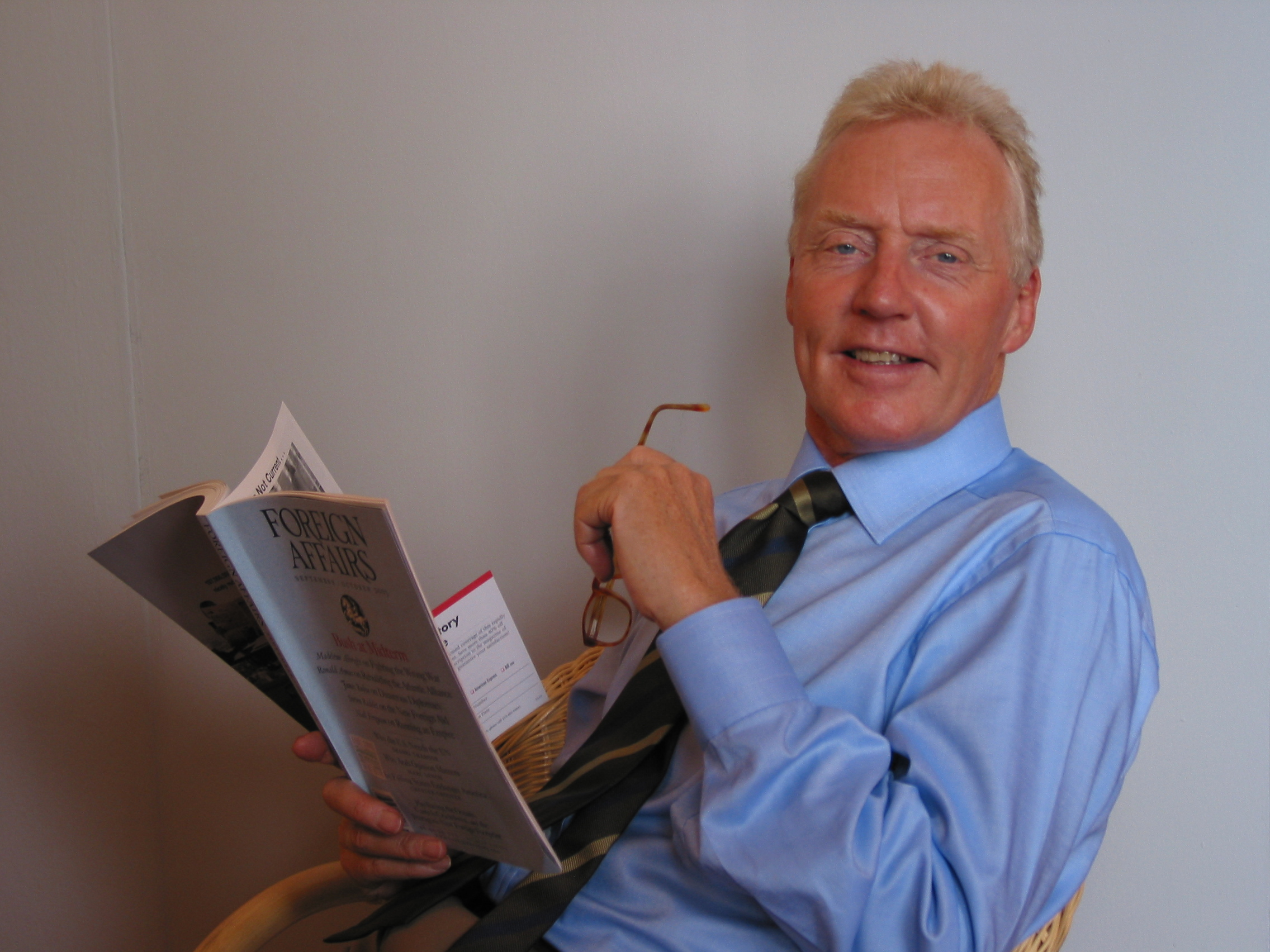
Brian Barron

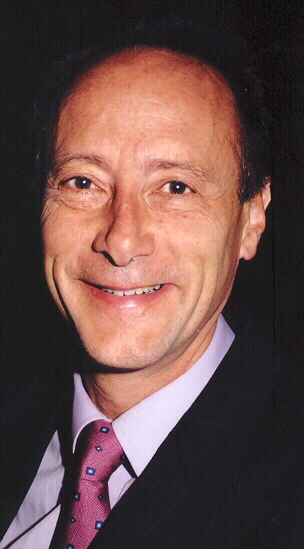
Piers Merchant

- 1 September – Jake Drake-Brockman, musician (Echo & The Bunnymen) and sound recordist (road accident) (b. 1955)
- 2 September
  - Donald Hamilton Fraser, painter (b. 1929)
  - John Poole, sculptor (b. 1926)
- 4 September
  - Iain Cuthbertson, actor (b. 1930)
  - Keith Waterhouse, writer (b. 1929)
- 7 September – Colin Sharp, actor and singer/songwriter (b. 1953)
- 13 September – Felix Bowness, actor (b. 1922)
- 14 September
  - Keith Floyd, TV chef (heart attack) (b. 1943)
  - Bobby Graham, session drummer (b. 1940)
- 16 September
  - Brian Barron, journalist and war correspondent (b. 1940)
  - Timothy Bateson, actor (b. 1926)
  - John Littlewood, chess player (b. 1931)
- 21 September
  - Michael Lockett, soldier (killed in action in Afghanistan) (b. 1980)
  - Piers Merchant, politician (b. 1951)
- 26 September – W. I. B. Crealock, yacht designer (b. 1920)
- 30 September – Robert S. Baker, television producer (b. 1916)

=== October ===
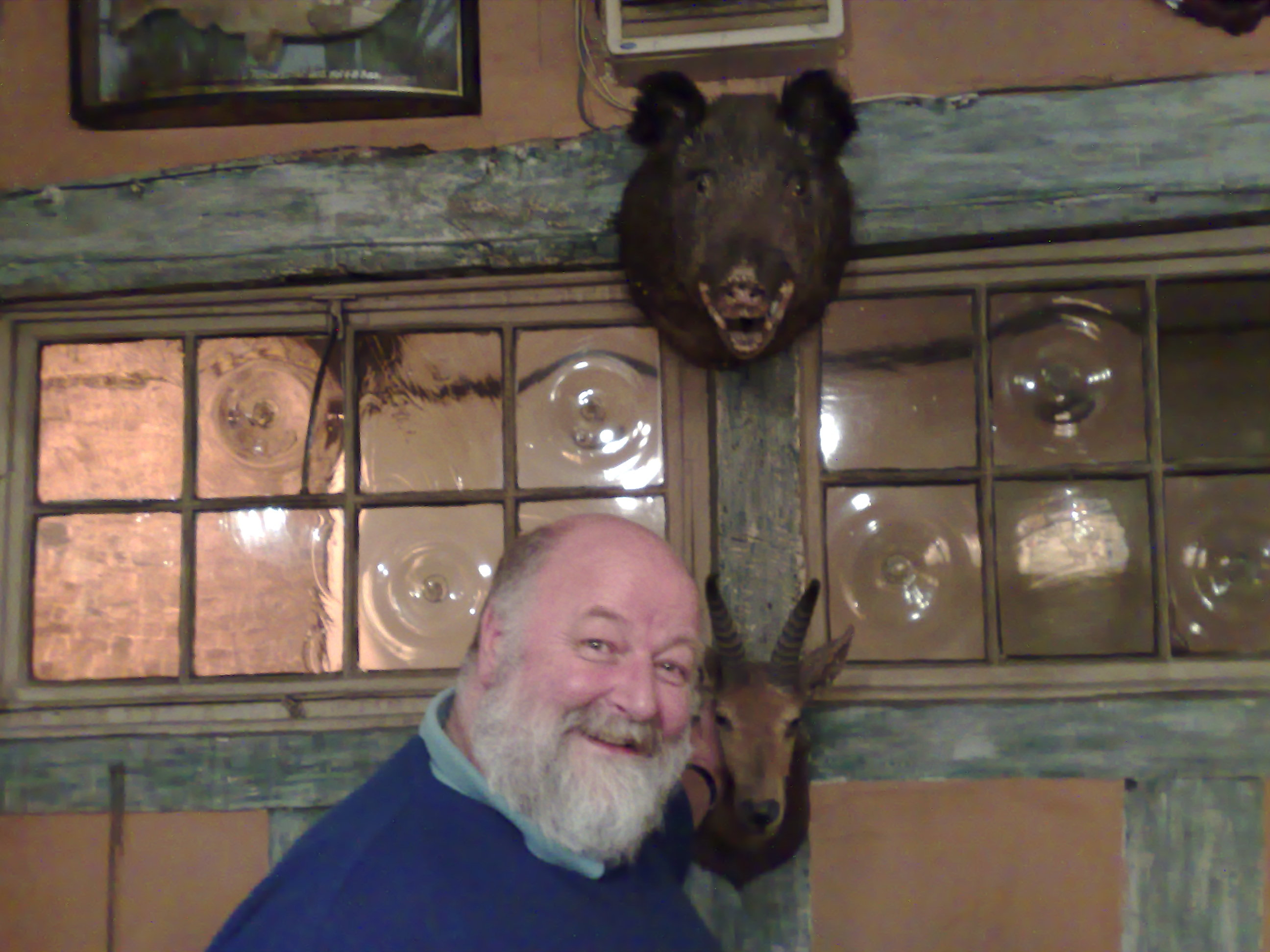
Robert Kirby

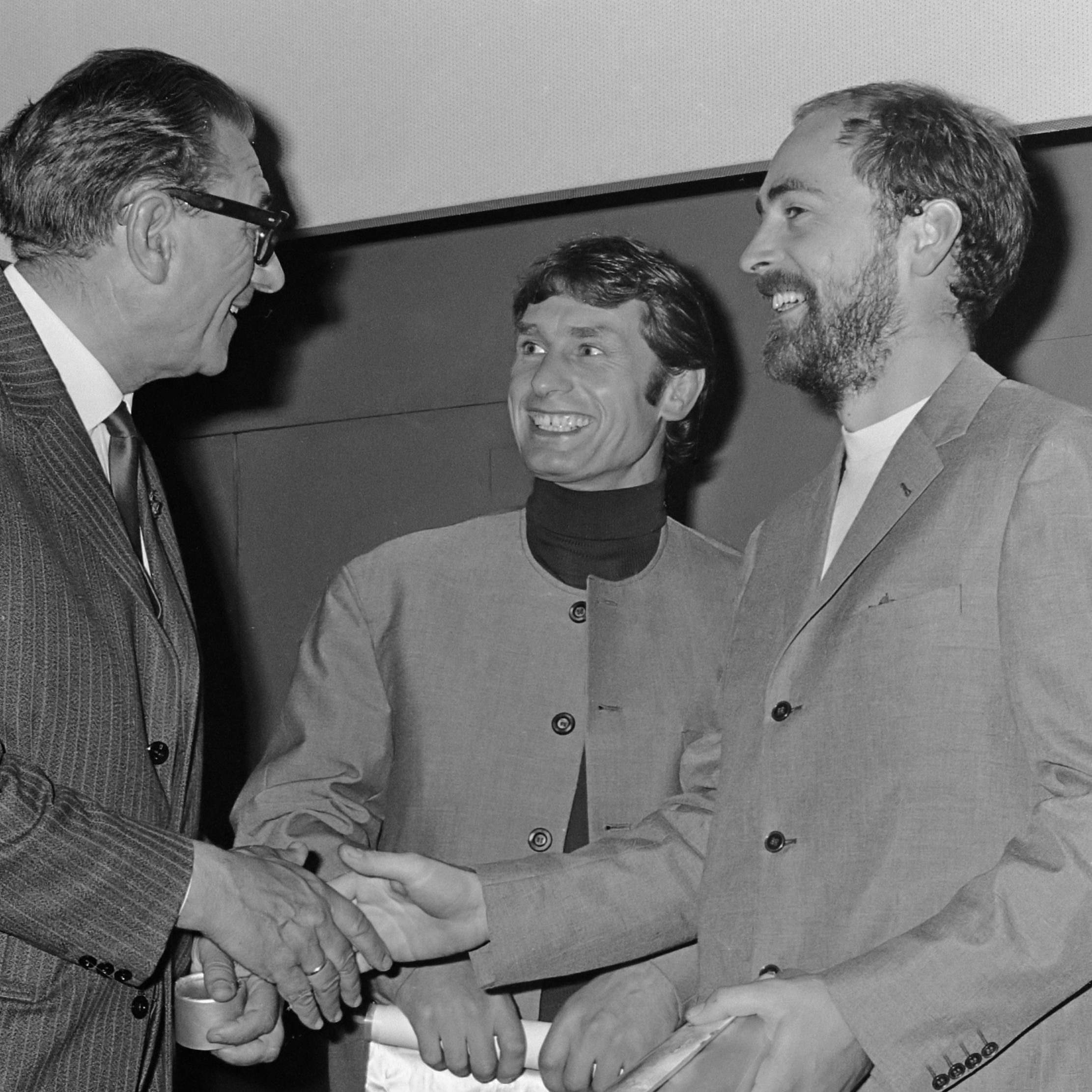
Maurice Agis (centre)

- 1 October – James FitzRoy, Earl of Euston, heir to the Duke of Grafton (b. 1947)
- 2 October – Shaun Wylie, mathematician and World War II codebreaker (b. 1913)
- 3 October – Robert Kirby, folk rock music arranger (b. 1948)
- 4 October – Fred Kaan, clergyman and hymn writer (b. 1929, the Netherlands)
- 5 October – Hugh Lloyd-Jones, classical scholar (b. 1922)
- 7 October – Helen Watts, contralto (b. 1927)
- 9 October – Barry Letts, actor and television director (b. 1925)
- 12 October
  - Maurice Agis, sculptor (b. 1931)
  - Ian Wallace, bass-baritone opera singer (b. 1919)
- 17 October
  - Louisa Mark, lovers rock singer (b. 1960)
  - Brian Campbell Vickery, information scientist (b. 1918 in Australia)
- 18 October – Sir Ludovic Kennedy, author, journalist and campaigner (b. 1919)
- 21 October
  - Louise Cooper, novelist (b. 1952)
  - Lionel Davidson, novelist (b. 1922)
  - Clinton Ford, singer (b. 1931)
- 25 October – Alexander Piatigorsky, philosopher (b. 1929, Soviet Union)
- 27 October – David Shepherd, cricketer and umpire (b. 1940)
- 29 October – Norman Painting, radio actor (The Archers) (b. 1924)

=== November ===
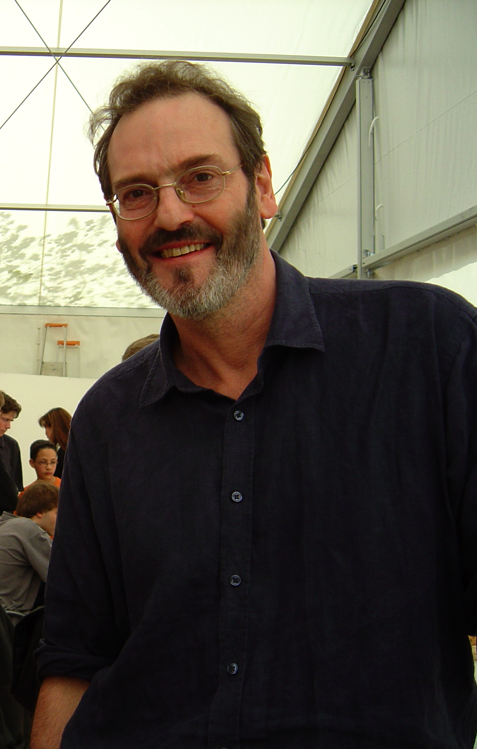
Robert Holdstock

- 2 November – Leonard Steinberg, Baron Steinberg, businessman and life peer (b. 1936)
- 3 November – John Crofton, medical pioneer (b. 1912)
- 4 November – David Tree, actor (b. 1915)
- 7 November – Chris Harman, journalist and activist (b. 1942)
- 8 November – Malcolm Laycock, radio presenter and producer (b. 1938)
- 10 November – Anne Mustoe, teacher, cyclist and travel writer (b. 1933)
- 15 November
  - Derek B, rapper (b. 1965)
  - Anna Mendelssohn, writer, poet and activist (b. 1948)
- 16 November
  - Jeff Clyne, jazz bassist (b. 1937)
  - Edward Woodward, actor (b. 1930)
- 17 November
  - John Craxton, painter (b. 1922)
  - Mickey Dias, barrister and legal scholar (b. 1921, Ceylon)
- 18 November – Johnny Almond, saxophonist (b. 1946)
- 21 November – Edward Fennessy, electronics engineer (b. 1912)
- 28 November – Eric Kemp, Anglican prelate and theologian, Bishop of Chichester (1974–2001) (b. 1915)
- 30 November – Robert Holdstock, novelist (b. 1948)

=== December ===
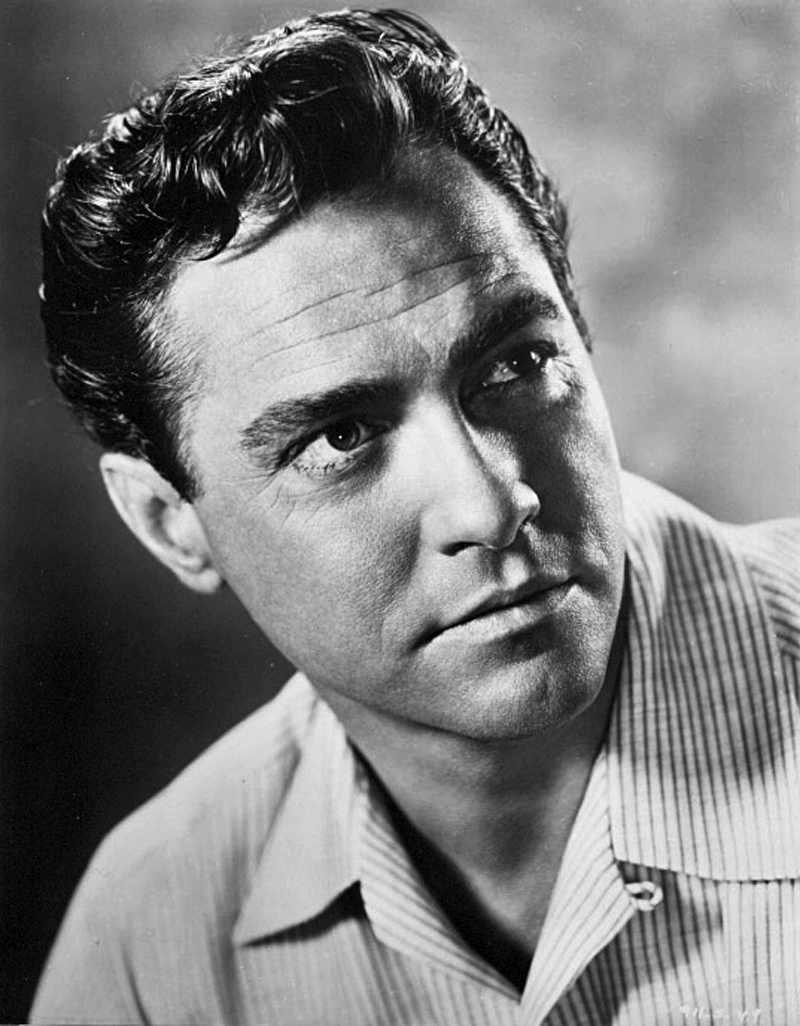
Richard Todd

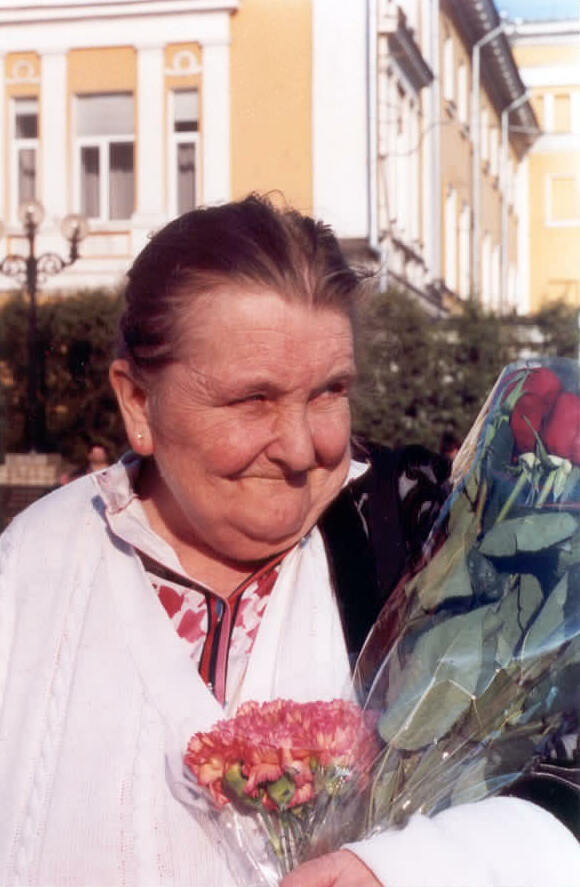
Vera Rich

- 1 December – Cordelia Oliver, Scottish journalist, painter and art critic (b. 1923)
- 2 December
  - Maggie Jones, actress (b. 1934)
  - Eric Woolfson, musician (b. 1945)
- 3 December
  - Sam Salt, RN rear-admiral and Falklands War veteran (b. 1940)
  - Richard Todd, actor (b. 1919)
- 4 December
  - Stephen Toulmin, philosopher (b. 1922)
  - Francis Wilford-Smith, cartoonist (b. 1927)
- 5 December – Garfield Morgan, actor (b. 1931)
- 10 December
  - Sir John Gingell, RAF air marshal, Black Rod (1985–1992) (b. 1925)
  - Sir Alan Huggins, judge (b. 1921)
- 14 December – Alan A'Court, footballer (b. 1934)
- 16 December
  - T. G. H. James, Egyptologist (b. 1923)
  - Paddy Ridsdale, Lady Ridsdale, politician and World War II agent (b. 1921)
- 17 December – Samuel Victor Perry, biochemist (b. 1918)
- 18 December – Robin Wood, film critic (b. 1931)
- 20 December
  - Pete King, saxophonist (b. 1929)
  - Vera Rich, poet and translator (b. 1936)
- 21 December
  - Craigie Aitchison, painter (b. 1926)
  - Marianne Stone, actress (b. 1921)
- 24 December – George Cowling, meteorologist and first BBC television weatherman (b. 1920)
- 26 December – David Taylor, politician (b. 1946)

== See also ==
- 2009 in British music
- 2009 in British television
- List of British films of 2009
