= Harold Hitchcock =

English painter

Harold Hitchcock (23 May 1914 – 8 August 2009), born Raymond Hitchcock, was an English visionary landscape artist.

== Biography ==
Born in Camden Town, London into a family of artists (descended from the animal artist George Stubbs on his mother's side), Harold was inspired to paint as a result of an ecstatic experience he had as a young boy whilst living with his grandparents in the Essex village of Thundersley. At the age of 16 he was hailed in the press as a child prodigy as a result of the enthusiasm of Dame Laura Knight for his work. He went into commercial art.

In the Second World War, as a conscientious objector in the Non-Combatant Corps, he volunteered for bomb disposal work. He continued to paint and in 1945 was given an exhibition of his work by Margaret Torrie, who was very influential on the London art scene at that time running the International Arts Centre in west London. Margaret and her husband Alfred, both Quakers, later introduced Harold to the spiritual movement Subud, which had a profound effect on his life and work.

After the war and now married, Harold enjoyed much success selling his work at the Hampstead open-air exhibition. and in 1964 he gave up commercial work to concentrate on his own painting full-time. He came to the attention of Hastings, 12th Duke of Bedford, who became a patron, giving Harold an exhibition at his palatial home. Woburn Abbey. Major London exhibitions followed as did a widening market for his work in the US. His work was admired by art establishment figures of the time, including Kenneth Clark and Sir Roy Strong, then director of the Victoria and Albert Museum. In 1984 Hitchcock was given the rare honour of a retrospective exhibition at the RSA gallery in London.

Harold's son, Leonard Hitchcock (born 1952), is also an artist who works in a similar style to his father, continuing the romantic, visionary English landscape tradition of J. M. W. Turner and Samuel Palmer.

== Art ==
His work is purely imaginative – often depicting, in fine detail, a romantic mythological world of idealised beauty, suffused in light, and reminiscent of the 17th-century painter Claude Lorrain. However, his art often has a peculiarly English quality following in the tradition of artists such as William Blake (in his adoption of a personal mythology) and particularly Samuel Palmer in his depiction of a pastoral idyll. His use of light also recalls the paintings of J. M. W. Turner. Remarkably unaffected by modern trends in art, he followed his own unique inner vision, working in a spontaneous way with great technical skill.

Later works have additionally included a more figurative and semi-abstract style, but without sacrificing the prismatic jewel-like quality of light and colour seen in the landscapes.

=== Gallery ===
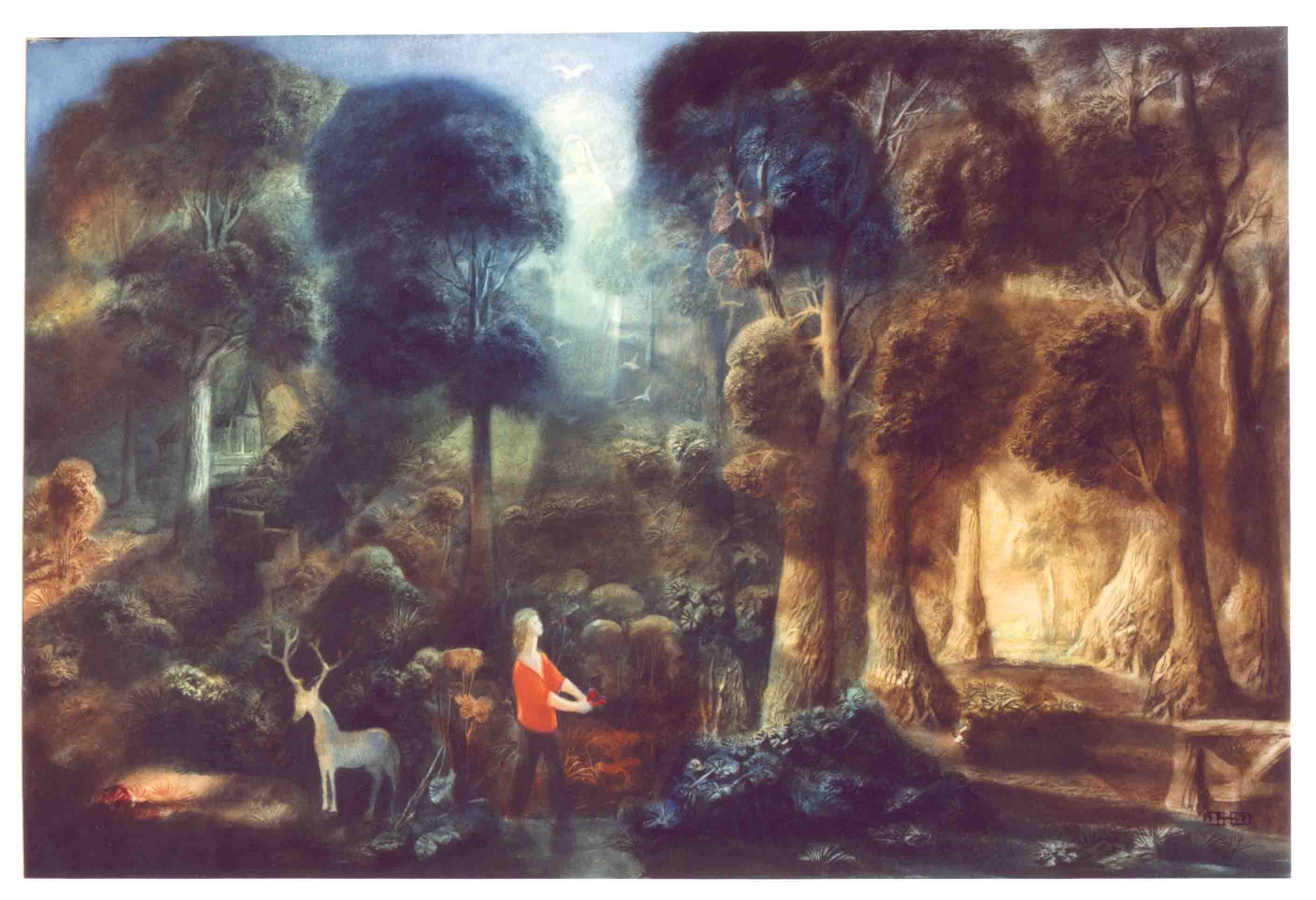
Thundersley (1978)

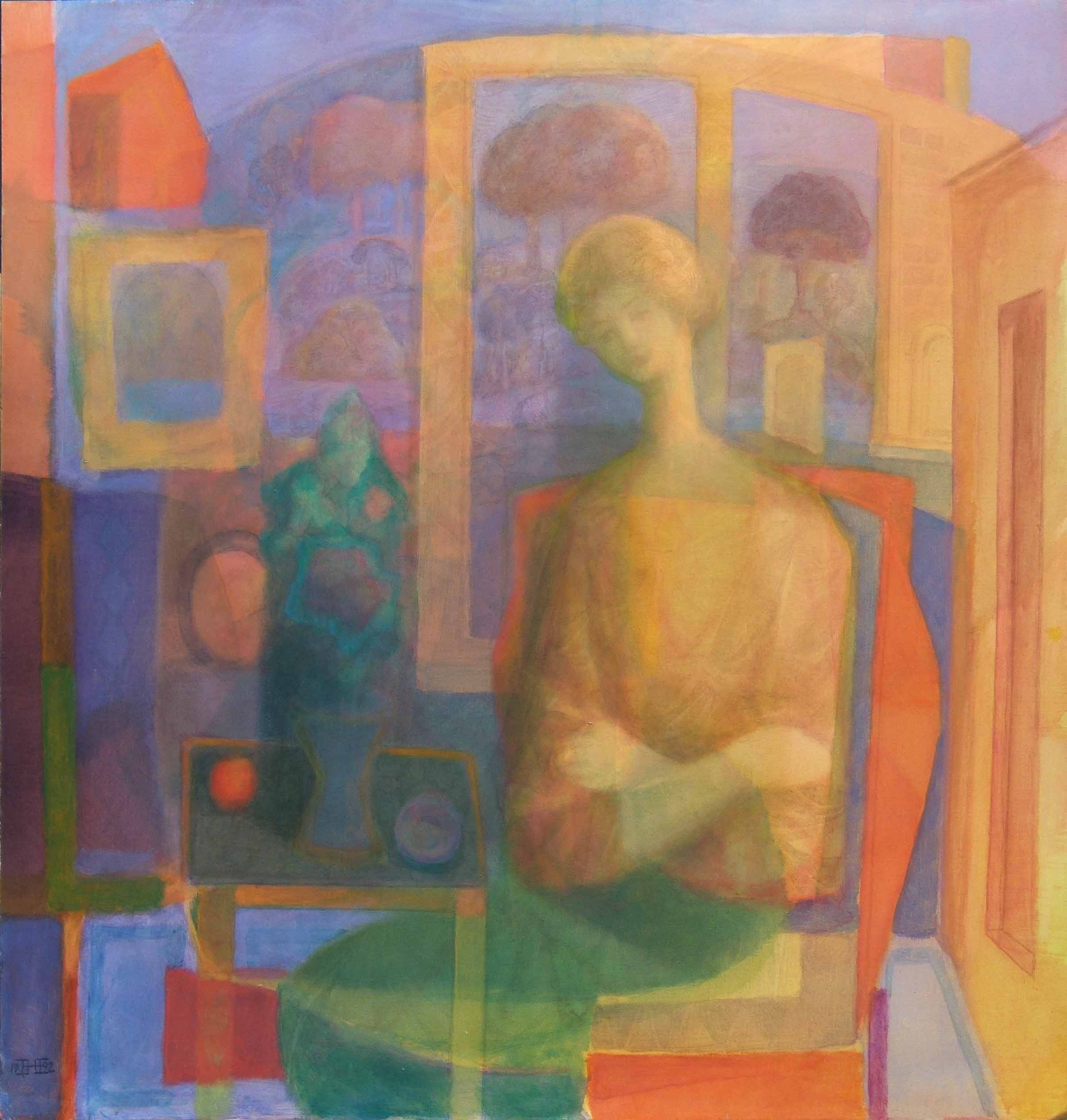
Girl at a Window (1997)

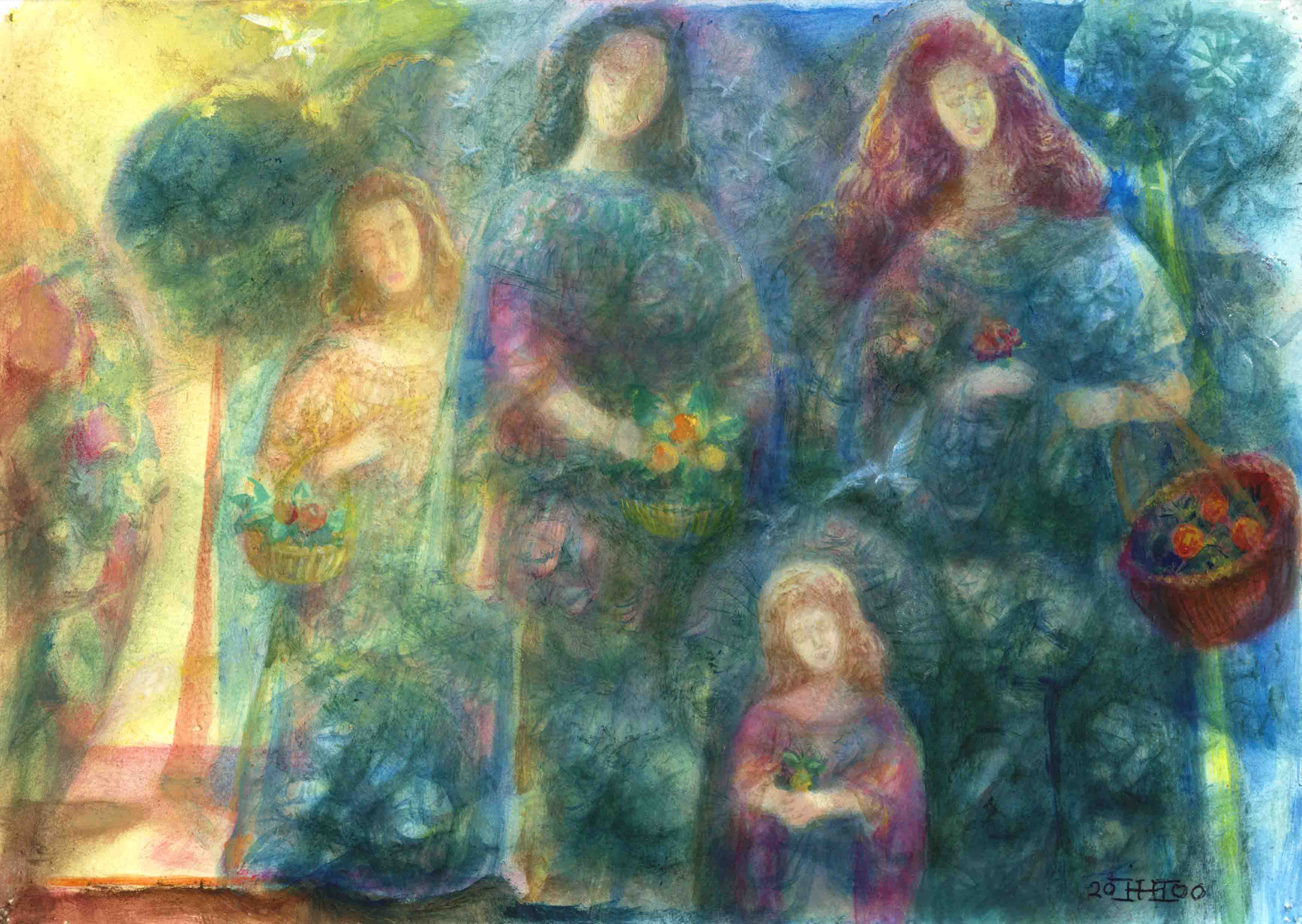
Harvest Celebration (2000)

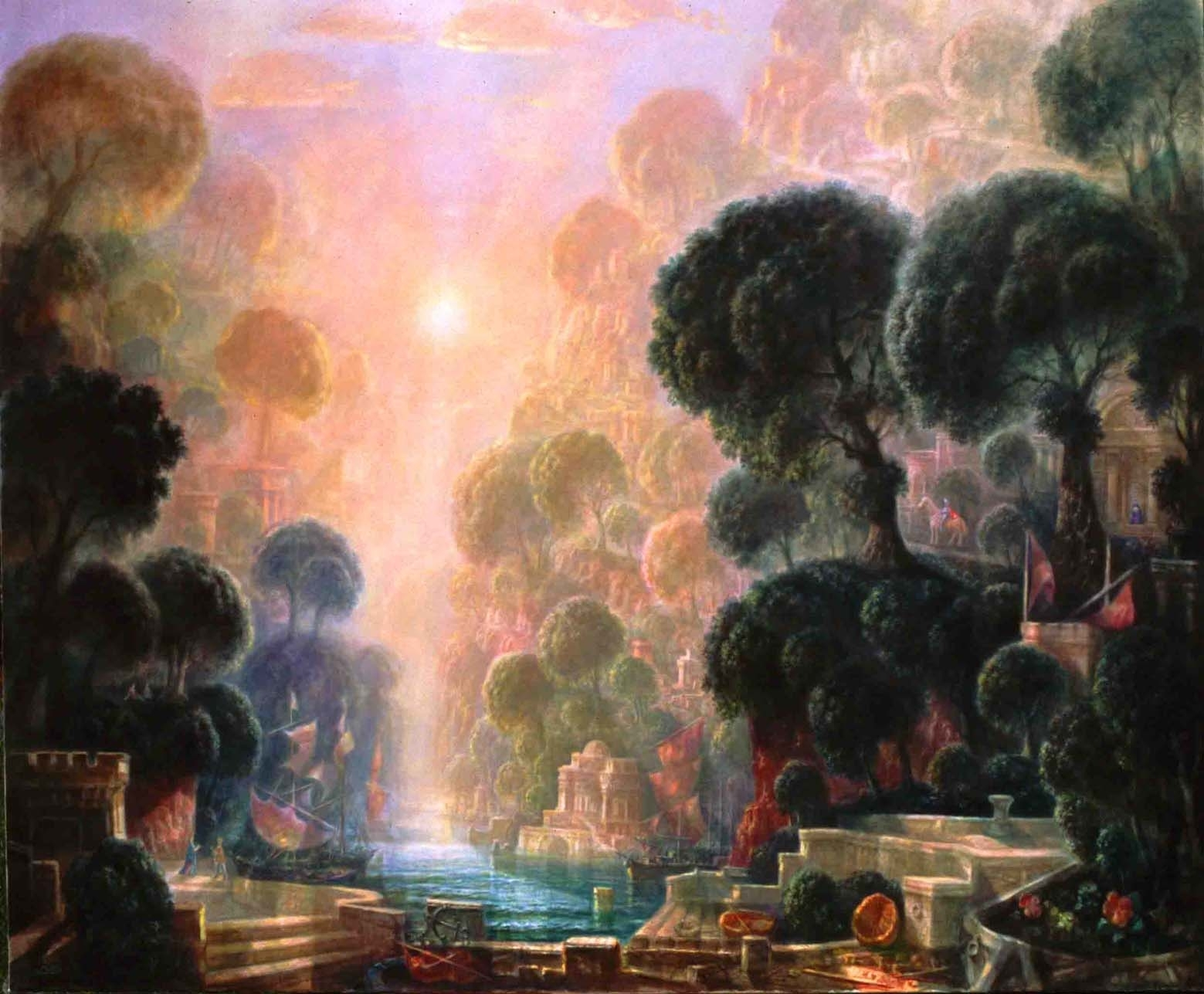
Sunrise on Cythera (2002)

== Public presentations ==
=== Exhibitions ===
- Walker Gallery, London 1956
- Mercury Gallery London
- Ewan Phillips London
- Austin Hayes London
- Rimmell Gallery London
- DaVinci Gallery London
- Leicester Galleries Leicester Sq. London
- Reid Gallery Bond St. London 1967
- Woburn Abbey Sponsored by the Duke of Bedford 1967
- Royal Institute Gallery London Retrospective 1967
- Upper Grosvenor Gallery London 1969
- Kurt Schon Gallery New Orleans USA 1971
- Touring Exhibition USA during 1972 [including exhibitions at Atlanta City, Huntsville, Winston-Salem, Daytona Beach, New Orleans]
- Pilkington Glass Museum, UK 1973
- Campbell and Franks Gallery, Harley St. London 1975
- Christopher Wood Gallery London 1983
- Royal Society of Arts Picadilly, London 1984
- Christopher Wood Gallery London 1986
- New Orleans Museum of Art 1988
- Hanson Gallery New Orleans 1989
- Marikay Vance Gallery Chicago 1992
- Agora Gallery New York 1999
- Phillip Gallery California 1999
- Phillips Gallery San Jose 2003
- Phillips Gallery Carmel 2004

=== Permanent collections ===
- Rowntree Memorial Trust UK
- Lidice Memorial Museum Czechoslovakia
- Museum of Fine Art N.Carolina USA
- University of Louisiana USA
- Victoria and Albert Museum London
- Hunterian Museum Glasgow Scotland
- University Library of Winston-Salem USA
