= Brian Barron =

British journalist

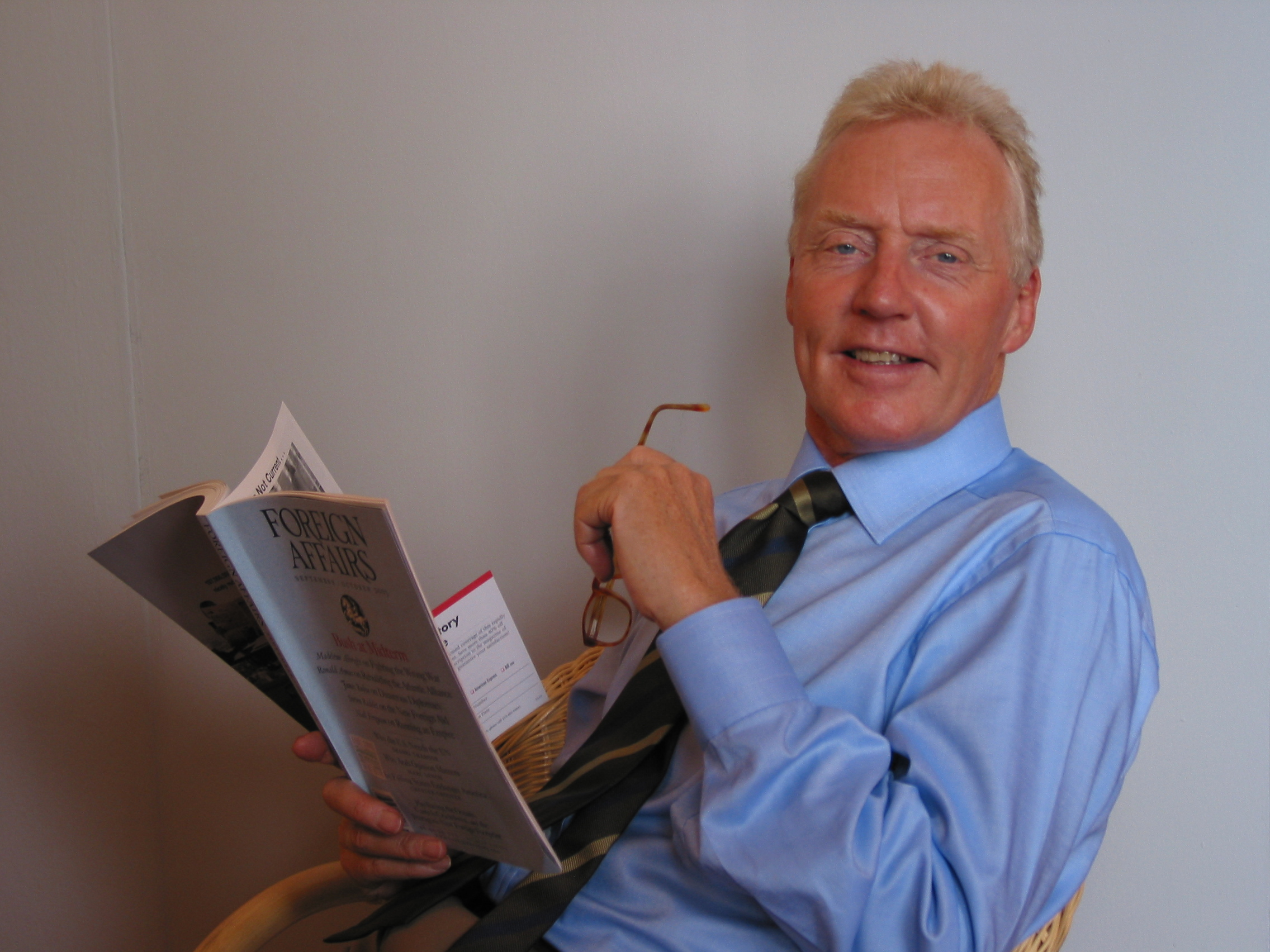
- Born: Brian Munro Barron; 28 April 1940; Bristol
- Died: 16 September 2009 (aged 69); St Ives, Cornwall
- Occupations: Journalist, War correspondent
- Notable credit(s): Last BBC Aden correspondent Fall and interview of Idi Amin; First Gulf war
- Spouse: Angela Lee 1974–2009, his death

Brian Munro Barron MBE (28 April 1940 – 16 September 2009) was a British foreign and war correspondent for BBC News. During a career spanning five decades he reported on many major world events, including the end of British rule in Aden, the Vietnam War, the troubles in Northern Ireland, the 1991 Gulf War and the 2003 Iraq War. He was also the recipient of a Royal Television Society award for Reporter of the Year in 1980, and was presented with an International Reporting Prize for work in Latin America. He was awarded the MBE for his services to broadcasting in 2006.

== Early life and career ==
Born in Bristol, Barron attended Bristol Grammar School. Directly on leaving school, he started as a print journalist, working for the Western Daily Press in Bristol, before joining BBC News as a chief sub-editor in 1965.

Barron spent 40 years with the BBC, mostly overseas, starting as a producer with what became the BBC World Service. Barron was appointed Aden correspondent in 1967, covering the fall of that part of the British Empire, after which he became Cairo correspondent in 1968.

In 1971 he became South East Asia correspondent, and covered the Vietnam War, including in 1975 reporting against instructions from BBC Governors as the last US Army helicopter left Saigon, and as the North Vietnamese Army claimed victory. He then covered the Cambodian–Vietnamese War.

Based in Nairobi from 1977 onwards, covering all of Africa as chief correspondent, Barron covered the end of the regime of Idi Amin, and was the first foreign correspondent to reach an abandoned Kampala, filing a report from the headquarters of the State Research Bureau, Amin's secret police. Jon Snow, then a rival correspondent for ITN, commented that Barron was:

The most tenacious, even ruthless, correspondent I have ever worked against – the ultimate, objective professional.

After Amin fled, Barron and cameraman Mohammed Amin, of Visnews in Nairobi, in 1980 located Amin to the Saudi Arabian city of Jeddah. Amin had been given refuge because of his conversion to Islam; after weeks of negotiation Barron secured the first interview with him since his deposition.

While still based in Africa, Barron later reported on the fall of Emperor Bokassa of the Central African Empire; and then the Rhodesian Bush War, resulting in the creation of Zimbabwe.

Returning to the United Kingdom in 1981, he became the BBC's all-Ireland correspondent, also spending three months covering the Falklands War from Chile, alongside longtime colleague Brian Hanrahan, who was with the British forces. Following a period in Washington D.C., he became chief Asia correspondent.

In 2000 Barron officially retired, but still resident in Asia in 2003 he covered the First Gulf War, where he started reporting from the US Navy nuclear powered aircraft carrier, USS Theodore Roosevelt (CVN-71).

Relocated back to New York City from mid-2004, after official retirement from the BBC in late 2005, Barron and his cameraman Eric Thirer continued to work together. In 2007, 40 years after reporting on the end of that part of the British Empire, the pair returned to Aden.

Barron won the 1980 Royal Television Society award for Reporter of the Year, and then the International Reporting Prize for work in Latin America. He was also awarded the MBE for his services to broadcasting in 2006.

== Death ==
He died, at the age of 69, of cancer at his family home. Tributes were paid by former BBC World News editor Jon Williams who said: "He was simply the most distinguished BBC correspondent of our age".; Mark Thompson, the then BBC Director-General, said: "I heard the news of Brian's death with immense sadness, I worked with Brian earlier in my career in America and also in Beijing during the Tiananmen Square crisis. He was one of the best correspondents I have ever worked with. Audiences will long remember his penetrating and honest reporting of some of the biggest stories of the last five decades. Like all his many friends and colleagues I will remember him with deep admiration and affection." Former director of BBC News, Helen Boaden said "Brian was one of the most distinguished BBC correspondents of our age – covering wars across five decades, from Aden in 1967 to Iraq in 2003. He was an inspiration to many generations of journalists for his professionalism, extraordinary experience and lightness of touch. We shall miss him very much"
