= James Klass =

UK radio DJ

James Klass (born 7 July 1965), was a British radio DJ for Radio City 96.7, Juice FM (formerly known as Crash F.M) and BBC Radio Merseyside, with a career spanning 25 years.

In 2009, he was awarded the Liverpool Black History Month's 'Lifetime Achievement' award for his work in the Liverpool radio industry, and within the black community of the city. Also, he has had an award named after him in his honour titled, The James Klass Arts & Media Award.

On 12 July 2009, James Klass died after suffering with colon cancer. His funeral took place in the Liverpool Anglican Cathedral along with his burial at Allerton Cemetery on Friday 17 July 2009. He left six children, including two adopted children.
