= Edward Preston & Sons =

- Industry: Manufacturing
- Founded: 1825
- Headquarters: Birmingham, England
- Key people: Edward Preston Sr. (c. 1798–1883); Edward Preston Jr. (1835–1913)
- Products: Hand tools

Edward Preston & Sons is a tool manufacturer based in Birmingham, England.

== History ==
It seems that Edward Preston Sr. (c. 1798–1883) was first listed as a plane-maker at 77 Lichfield Street in the Birmingham Directory of 1833, but later listings and advertisements assert that the business was started in 1825. Preston is likewise recorded as a plane-maker living with his family in Lichfield Street in the 1841 census, at which time his younger son Edward was 6 years old. Around 1850, his son Edward left school to join his father's business and is recorded in the 1851 census as a plane-maker at his father's address. He appears to have been quite a talented and resourceful young man, as he had later been able to start up his own "wood and brass spirit level manufactory" at 97½ Lichfield Street by 1864.

By 1866, Edward Jr. had added planes, routers, joiners, coach, gun, cabinet and carpenters tools to his line, and the following year he moved his shop from his father's address and relocated to 26 Newton Street, before moving again to much larger premises at 22–24 Whittall Street. This location became known as the Whittall Works and later was the office and factory of Edward Preston & Sons, Ltd.

In 1889 Edward Preston Jr.'s three sons were brought into the firm and the name was changed to Edward Preston & Sons, becoming Edward Preston & Sons Ltd on incorporation in 1898. Part of the firm's output was a healthy line of malleable and gun-metal planes and patent adjustable iron smoothers, shoulder planes, bullnose and block planes - a range that was expanded in later years. The 1901 catalogue shows several styles of planes which were unique to the Preston brand, along with the usual styles which had already been set by other makers such as Spiers and Norris.

The death of Edward Preston Jr. was reported in the Lichfield Mercury of 26 September 1913: "Mr. Preston was decidedly of an innovative turn of mind," the newspaper wrote, "as many of the machines in use at his works, as well as of the tools produced were the invention of himself and his three sons, who now manage the business." The report noted that at the time of his death, the business was carried on at Whittall Works, Cheston Street, Aston, Birmingham.

=== Later years ===
Falling on hard times, the firm of Edward Preston & Sons was sold to the Birmingham firm of John Rabone & Sons in 1932 and shortly thereafter manufacturing rights to some of the Preston range of planes were sold to the Sheffield firm of C. & J. Hampton, who would later merge with the Record Tool Company. Some of the Preston planes were directly added to the Record line by the Hampton firm, while others were modified or discontinued altogether.

=== Maker's marks ===
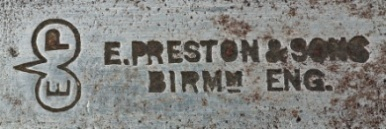
EP mark for Edward Preston & Sons, from the iron of a Preston bull-nose rebate plane

Generally all Preston wooden planes are clearly stamped on the front of the plane, the shape, size and character type of the stamp indicating the age of the plane. On some metal planes all the component parts were stamped with a number or symbol during manufacture. This number was used to re-assemble the parts following a batch process.

Not all Preston tools are trade-marked clearly. Early shoulder, rebate, chariot planes and chamfer rebates commonly appear without trademarks, but may have assembly numbers.

The "E P" trade-mark was already in use by 1882.

The trade-mark "Preston" also appears on some later tools that were manufactured in Sheffield, England. These are generally smoothing planes and appear modern and very similar in construction to other modern manufacturers' planes.

== Awards at world's fairs ==
Awards at world's fairs:

- International Exhibition, Sydney, 1879. First award
- International Exhibition, Melbourne, 1880. First award
- Adelaide Jubilee International Exhibition, 1887. First order of merit

== Bibliography ==
- Adamson, John, "Edward Preston", Furniture & Cabinetmaking, issue 258, June 2017, pp. 58–61
- Edward Preston & Sons Ltd (1901); reprinted with introduction by Kenneth D. Roberts (1979). Illustrated Price List of Rules, Spirit-Levels, Planes and Tools &c., Manufactured by Edward Preston & Sons Fitzwilliam, NH: Ken Roberts Publishing Company ISBN 0-913602-30-2 OCLC 59731490
- Edward Preston & Sons (1995). The "Preston" Catalogue: rules, levels, planes, braces and hammers, thermometers, saws, mechanic's tools &c.: Catalogue No. 18, May 1909 (reprint ed.). Mendham, NJ: Astragal Press. ISBN 0-9618088-9-6. OCLC 26951201.
- Russell, David R.; with photography by James Austin and foreword by David Linley (2010). Antique Woodworking Tools: Their Craftsmanship from the Earliest Times to the Twentieth Century, Cambridge: John Adamson ISBN 978-1-898565-05-5 OCLC 727125586
- Salaman, R.A. (1997 ed. revised by Philip Walker) Dictionary of Woodworking Tools c. 1700–1970 and Tools of Allied Trades. Mendham, NJ: Astragal Press ISBN 978-1-879335-79-0 OCLC 41123740
