= John Adamson (publisher) =

British publisher, translator and writer

- Born: 1949 (age 76–77); Devon, England
- Education: University of Edinburgh; University of Geneva
- Occupations: publisher, translator and writer
- Website: johnadamsonbooks.com

John Adamson FSA (born 1949) is a British publisher, translator and writer. He specialises in illustrated books in the fine and decorative arts.

== Biography ==
John Adamson was born in Devon, the younger son of George Worsley Adamson, illustrator and cartoonist and Mary Marguerita Renée (née Diamond). After studying at the University of Edinburgh and the University of Geneva, he joined Cambridge University Press in 1974.

He held various functions within the marketing department of the Press: first as European sales representative (1975); then publicity manager (1977); becoming export sales director in 1980. During the period of his directorship, Cambridge University Press won for the first time the Queen's Award for Export Achievement.

While at Cambridge University Press he helped mount two exhibitions of humorous art in his spare time. For the first of these, "L’Humour Actuel franco-britannique. 200 dessins" [Franco-British Humour Today: 200 drawings], hosted by the Galerie M.L.R. Genot in the Marais, Paris in 1974, he "organized the British contribution", commissioning Quentin Blake to design the poster. The second exhibition "Famous British Cartoonists" was held the following year at the London Gallery, N. La Cienega Boulevard, Los Angeles, and featured only the cartoons of artists working in the British Isles. "Many [cartoons] such as those by George Adamson almost leave the field of illustrations to become technically speaking fine art," wrote Betje Howell in her review of the show in the Los Angeles Herald Examiner.

In 1987 he was appointed Head of Publications and Retailing at the National Portrait Gallery, London, where in the course of his five-year tenure he and his team were involved in the publication of exhibition catalogues and books ranging from Franz Xaver Winterhalter to T. E. Lawrence, from The Raj to a pictorial volume on the NPG's permanent collection.

In 1992 he set himself up as a publishing and picture-library consultant. He advised private collectors as well as museums such as the Wallace Collection, providing them with a full editorial and production service. Soon, however, he began working as an independent publisher making available an ongoing range of illustrated books and catalogues for museums, dealers and private collectors under his own imprint, as well as translating books and exhibition catalogues on behalf of French publishers such as the Réunion des musées nationaux (RMN), Éditions Gallimard, Éditions Diane de Selliers and Éditions Faton.

== Honours ==
- Fellow of the Society of Antiquaries of London (FSA). (3 March 2019)

== Select bibliography ==
=== As publisher ===
- The Alphabet Book of Amos Lewis: An Elizabethan calligraphic manuscript revealed, Simon Swynfen Jervis (editor) ISBN 978-1-898565-20-8 OCLC 1422226157
- Footloose in France, John Adamson and Clive Jackson ISBN 978-1-898565-18-5 OCLC 1391677751
- Great Irish Households: Inventories from the Long Eighteenth Century, Tessa Murdoch (editor) ISBN 978-1-898565-17-8
- Margaret de Flahaut (1788–1867): A Scotswoman at the French Court, Diana Scarisbrick ISBN 978-1-898565-16-1
- English Silver before the Civil War: The David Little Collection, Timothy Schroder ISBN 978-1-898565-15-4
- Art in Industry: The Silver of Paul Storr, Christopher Hartop ISBN 978-1-898565-14-7
- Koopmanrareart.com: Masterpieces in the Digital Age, Koopman Rare Art with photographs by Karen Bengall ISBN 978-1-898565-13-0
- Gilt-edged Splendour: Masterpieces of Silver Gilt, Koopman Rare Art with photographs by Guy Hills ISBN 978-1-898565-12-3
- A Handsome Cupboard of Plate: Early American Silver in the Cahn Collection, Deborah Dependahl Waters with foreword by Kaywin Feldman. In association with Minneapolis Institute of Arts (MIA), Minneapolis, MA, exh. cat. ISBN 978-1-898565-11-6
- In Good Hands: 250 Years of Craftsmanship at Swaine Adeney Brigg, Katherine Prior ISBN 978-1-898565-09-3
- Regency Silver, Koopman Rare Art with photographs by Guy Hills ISBN 978-1-898565-10-9
- Norfolk Summer: Making The Go-Between, Christopher Hartop ISBN 978-1-898565-07-9
- Rococo Silver, Koopman Rare Art with photographs by Guy Hills ISBN 978-1-898565-06-2
- The Classical Ideal: English Silver, 1760–1840, Christopher Hartop with foreword by Tim Knox, exh. cat. ISBN 978-0-9524322-9-6
- Antique Woodworking Tools: Their Craftsmanship from the Earliest Times to the Twentieth Century, David R. Russell with foreword by David Linley and photographs by James Austin. In association with Bernard J. Shapero ISBN 978-1-898565-05-5
- The French Hospital in England: Its Huguenot History and Collections, Tessa Murdoch and Randolph Vigne with foreword by Jacob Pleydell-Bouverie, 8th Earl of Radnor ISBN 978-0-9524322-7-2
- Geometry and the Silversmith: The Domcha Collection, Christopher Hartop with foreword by Jonathan Norton ISBN 978-0-9524322-8-9
- Noble Households: Eighteenth-Century Inventories of Great English Houses. A tribute to John Cornforth, edited by Tessa Murdoch, inventories transcribed by Candace Briggs and Laurie Lindey ISBN 978-0-9524322-5-8
- Beyond the Maker's Mark: Paul de Lamerie Silver in the Cahn Collection, Ellenor Alcorn with foreword by Tessa Murdoch and preface by Kaywin Feldman. In association with Memphis Brooks Museum of Art, Memphis, TN, exh. cat. ISBN 978-0-9524322-6-5
- The German Ambassador's Residence in London, Regine Aldington with photographs by Fritz von der Schulenburg and Marianne Majerus ISBN 978-0-9524322-1-0
- Royal Goldsmiths: The Art of Rundell & Bridge 1797–1843, Christopher Hartop et al., with foreword by HRH The Prince of Wales, introduction by Philippa Glanville; essays by Diana Scarisbrick, Charles Truman, David Watkin and Matthew Winterbottom, exh. cat. ISBN 978-0-9524322-3-4
- East Anglian Silver: 1550–1750, edited by Christopher Hartop with foreword by Robert Shirley, 13th Earl Ferrers, exh. cat. ISBN 978-0-9524322-2-7
- Middle Eastern Environment: Selected Papers of the 1995 Conference of the British Society for Middle Eastern Studies, edited by Eric Watkins ISBN 978-1898565-03-1 OCLC 37341135

=== As editor and producer for other publishers ===
- Arnold, H. J. P.; Paul Doherty and Patrick Moore. The Photographic Atlas of the Stars. Bristol and Philadelphia: Institute of Physics Publishing (1997) ISBN 978-0-7503-0378-1
- Beresford, Richard. A Dance to the Music of Time. London: Wallace Collection (1995) ISBN 978-0-900785-46-7
- Chadour-Sampson, Beatriz. Antike Fingerringe/Ancient finger rings. Die Sammlung Alain Ollivier/The Alain Ollivier Collection Munich: Prähistorische Staatssammlung (now Archäologische Staatssammlung) (1997) ISBN 978-3-927806-20-7
- Hartop, Christopher; and Ellenor Alcorn. British and Irish Silver in the Fogg Art Museum. New Haven: Yale University Press (2007) ISBN 978-0300-11770-7
- Hartop, Christopher. The Huguenot Legacy: English Silver 1680–1760 from the Alan and Simone Hartman Collection. exh. cat. London: Thomas Heneage (1996) ISBN 978-0-946708-28-4
- Hartop, Christopher. Noble Feast: English Silver from the Jerome and Rita Gans Collection at the Virginia Museum of Fine Arts. exh. cat. Richmond VA: Virginia Museum of Fine Arts in association with John Adamson (2007) ISBN 978-0-917046-83-4
- Hartop, Christopher. A Noble Pursuit: English Silver from the Rita Gans Collection at the Virginia Museum of Fine Arts. exh. cat. Richmond, VA: Virginia Museum of Fine Arts in association with John Adamson (2010) ISBN 978-0-917046-90-2
- Higgott, Suzanne. Wallace Collection: Catalogue of Glass & Limoges Painted Enamels. London: Wallace Collection (2011) ISBN 978-0-900785-85-6
- Hughes, Peter. French Eighteenth-Century Clocks and Barometers in the Wallace Collection. London: Wallace Collection (1994) ISBN 978-0-900785-45-0
- Hughes, Peter. Wallace Collection: Catalogue of Furniture (3 vols.). London: Wallace Collection (1996) ISBN 978-0-900785-56-6 (cloth); ISBN 978-0-900785-51-1 (paperback)
- Kolba, Judit. Hungarian Silver: The Nicolas M. Salgó Collection. London: Thomas Heneage (1997) ISBN 978-0-946708-26-0 (cloth); ISBN 978-0-946708-27-7 (paperback)
- Morton, Lucy, with foreword by John Partridge. Vision of the East. London: Partridge Fine Arts (1999)
- Ormond, Richard, and James Taylor. Rule Britannia! Art, Royalty & Power in the Age of Jamestown. exh. cat. Richmond, VA: Virginia Museum of Fine Arts in association with John Adamson (2008) ISBN 978-0917046-87-2
- Prior, Katherine; and John Adamson. Maharajas' Jewels. Paris: Éditions Assouline (2000) ISBN 978-2-84323-218-3
- Rawle, Tim. Cambridge (1st ed.). London: Frances Lincoln (2005) ISBN 978-0-7112-2549-7
- Rawle, Tim (author and photographer), John Adamson (editor). Cambridge (new ed. with foreword by William Bortrick). Cambridge: Oxbridge Portfolio (2016), 204 pp. ISBN 978-0-9572867-2-6
- Rawle, Tim (author), Tim Rawle and Louis Sinclair (photographers), John Adamson (editor). A Classical Adventure: The Architectural History of Downing College, Cambridge. Cambridge: The Oxbridge Portfolio (2015), 200 pp. ISBN 978 0 9572867 4 0
- Roth, Linda; and Claire Le Corbeiller. French Eighteenth-Century Porcelain at the Wadsworth Atheneum. Hartford. Connecticut: Wadsworth Atheneum (2000) ISBN 978-0918333-16-2
- Schroder, Timothy. Renaissance and Baroque Silver, Mounted Porcelain and Ruby Glass from the Zilkha Collection. London: Paul Holberton Publishing (2012) ISBN 978-1-907372-35-3
- Thuillier, Jacques. Poussin before Rome, transl. by Christopher Allen. exh. cat. New York: Richard Feigen (1995) ISBN 978-1-873232-03-3

=== As translator ===
- Schmuck, Kinetik, Objekte (Friedrich Becker), Stuttgart: Arnoldsche (1997) (Beatriz Chadour-Sampson's essay: "The finger rings of Friedrich Becker: towards a new vision", pp. 152–167) ISBN 978-3-925369-76-6
- The Louvre Collections, Paris: Réunion des Musées nationaux (1999) ISBN 978-2-7118-3871-4
- De bronze, d’or et d’argent: arts somptuaires de la Chine (Catherine Delacour), Paris: Réunion des Musées nationaux for Musée Guimet (2001), exh. cat. ISBN 978-2-7118-4108-0 (bilingual text throughout)
- National Museum Arts asiatiques Guimet, Paris: Réunion des Musées nationaux (2001) ISBN 978-2-7118-3897-4
- Gold of the Scythian Kings: translation of Le Petit Journal des grandes expositions, no. 332, for exhibition at the Grand Palais, 27 September – 31 December 2001
- Hair: The Long and the Short of It, coll. « Découvertes Gallimard » (nº 405), série Culture et société. Paris: Gallimard (2001) (with Heidi Ellison). Published on behalf of L'Oréal (original title: Les vies du cheveu, by Marie-Christine Auzou & Sabine Melchior-Bonnet)
- Skin: A Living Envelope, coll. « Découvertes Gallimard » (nº 420), série Sciences et techniques. Paris: Gallimard (2002) (editing with Alexandra Keens; translating of essays). Published on behalf of L'Oréal (original title: La peau : Une enveloppe de vie, by Claude Bouillon)
- Les Choix d'Henri Cartier-Bresson, exh. cat. Paris: Henri Cartier-Bresson Foundation (2003) (translation of Robert Delpire's foreword)
- "Confucius, or the Extraordinary Destiny of an Ordinary Man", Orientations, vol. 34, no. 9, November 2003, pp. 47–51 (translation of magazine article by Catherine Delacour at time of Musée Guimet's exhibition on Confucius)
- The Musée de l'Orangerie (Pierre Georgel), Paris: Gallimard in association with Réunion des Musées nationaux, coll. « Découvertes Gallimard Hors série » (2006) ISBN 978-2-07-078167-6 (Gallimard); ISBN 978-2-7118-5230-7 (RMN)
- The Golden Age of Classical India: The Gupta Empire, exh. cat. Grand Palais, Paris: Réunion des Musées nationaux (2007) ISBN 978-2-7118-5321-2 (three French essays translated into English)
- The Studio of Alberto Giacometti, exh. cat. Centre Pompidou, Paris: Fondation Alberto et Annette Giacometti/Centre Pompidou (2007) ISBN 978-2-84426-352-0 (translation into English of Hélène Pinet's essay: "The Studio of Alberto Giacometti in the Photographer's Eye: Coming Full Circle", pp. 53–74)
- A Taste for China: Paris 1730–1930, exh. cat. Hong Kong: Hong Kong Museum of Art (2008) ISBN 978-962-215-213-7 (French essays translated into English)
- Art of the Ganges delta: Masterpieces from Bangladeshi museums, exh. cat. Paris: Réunion des Musées nationaux (2008) ISBN 978-2-7118-5540-7
- La Cathédrale de Reims (Auguste Rodin and Gérard Rondeau), published to coincide with Gérard Rondeau's exhibition ‘La cathédrale et son bestiaire’, Palais du Tau, exh. cat. Paris: Réunion des Musées nationaux (2011) ISBN 978-2-7118-5800-2 (translation into English of Rodin's and Rondeau's essays)
- Canticle of the Birds (Attar), Paris: Éditions Diane de Selliers (2013) ISBN 978-2-36437-031-9 (translation into English of Leili Anvar's Introduction; Attar's poem is published in Afkham Darbandi and Dick Davis's unabridged verse translation from the Persian)
- Fabulous Fabergé, exh. cat. Dijon: Éditions Faton in association with the Montreal Museum of Fine Arts (2014) ISBN 978-2-89192-379-8 (translation into English of French texts)
- Rodin: The Laboratory of Creation, Hélène Maraud and Hélène Pinet, foreword by Catherine Chevillot, exh. cat. Dijon: Éditions Faton in association with the Musée Rodin (2014) ISBN 978-2-87844-200-7 (translation from the French into English)
- The Carracci Gallery: Its History and Restoration, Elvira Cajano and Emanuela Settimi (eds.) Dijon: Éditions Faton (2015) ISBN 978-2-87844-211-3 (translation into English of French texts)
- The new Musée de Pont-Aven: A treasure-house for Gauguin and the Pont-Aven School, Estelle Guille des Buttes-Fresneau et al., exh. cat. Dijon: Éditions Faton in association with the Musée de Pont-Aven (2016, 2nd edition 2018) ISSN 0998-8041 (translation from the French into English)
- Lalique and the art of travel, Véronique Brumm et al., exh. cat. Dijon: Éditions Faton in association with the Lalique Museum, Wingen-sur Moder, Alsace (2016) ISSN 0998-8041
- Ramayana, Paris: Éditions Diane de Selliers (forthcoming) (translation into English of Amina Okada's iconographic descriptions of the Indian miniatures)
- Japonisme and Architecture in France, 1550–1930, Jean-Sébastien Cluzel (ed.). Dijon: Éditions Faton (2022) ISBN 978-2-87844-307-3
- Survival Boogie Woogie: Neo-Japonisme, Architectural Photography & Abstraction, 1945–1985], Jean-Sébastien Cluzel. Leiden; Boston: Brill (2024) ISBN 978-90-04-71140-2 OCLC 1456983732

=== Articles published ===
- "Thorfinn the Puffin", illustrated by Sheridan Williams, Puffin Post, vol. 6, no. 4, pp. 16–17 (Penguin)
- "Nooks and Crannies", Eastword (journal of the Eastern Arts Association), June 1984, pp. 5 and 12, review of Granta 10: Travel writing (Bill Buford, editor), Penguin, 1984 ISBN 978-0-14-007052-1
- "Les publications à la rescousse des musées au Royaume-Uni", ICOM France, Lettre du comité national français, no. 13, March 1993 (lecture given in Marseilles, 6 December 1991, at a colloquium entitled Publications, éditions, musées, Centre de la Vieille Charité, Marseilles, on the occasion of the Assemblée générale du Comité français de l'ICOM)
- "Accounts Made Easy", review of Wendy McKenzie's book The Financial Times Guide to Using and Interpreting Company Accounts, African Business, March 1996, no. 208, p. 36
- "Computer King", review of Bill Gates's book The Road Ahead, African Business, April 1996, no. 209, pp. 36–37
- "The Real Richard Branson", review of Tim Jackson's book Virgin King, African Business, May 1996, no. 210, pp. 40–41
- "Measurement in the French Idiom", Salisbury Review, Spring 2004, vol. 22 No. 3, 2004, p. 2 (ifc)
- "Dining with a Despot?" Salisbury Review, Spring 2005, vol. 23 No. 3, 2005, pp. 33–35
- "American Tools Sold Abroad", Maine Antique Digest, December 2012, p. 35-B
- "Homecoming for Top American Tools Sold Abroad", Maine Antique Digest, August 2013, p. 74-C
- "Under the hammer: Antique woodworking tools: the missing link", Furniture & Cabinetmaking, issue 210, October 2013, pp. 60–61
- "Under the hammer: Fine tools by the chest load", Furniture & Cabinetmaking, issue 213, Winter 2013, pp. 46–47
- "More American Tools Sold Abroad", Maine Antique Digest, January 2014, p. 18-B
- "A tool to sell tools – the gavel strikes home", Furniture & Cabinetmaking, issue 220, July 2014, pp. 44–45
- "American tools ply the Atlantic", Maine Antique Digest, July 2014, p. 39-C
- "The great plane-makers: The history behind T. Norris & Son", Furniture & Cabinetmaking, issue 221, August 2014, pp. 58–62
- "The great tool-makers: The history behind the Holtzapffel dynasty", Furniture & Cabinetmaking, issue 222, September 2014, pp. 58–62
- "Two great Scottish tool-makers: Alexander Mathieson & Son(s) and Spiers of Ayr", Furniture & Cabinetmaking, issue 223, October 2014, pp. 58–62
- "The insatiable in full pursuit of the collectable", Furniture & Cabinetmaking, issue 227, January 2015, pp. 58–60
- "Planes and the Plain-speaking American", Maine Antique Digest, January 2015, p. 35-B
- "Takenaka Carpentry Tools Museum – Japan", Furniture & Cabinetmaking, issue 234, August 2015, pp. 16–20
- "Precision engineering meets craftsmanship", Furniture & Cabinetmaking, issue 235, September 2015, pp. 56–58
- "Plain dealing", Furniture & Cabinetmaking, issue 241, February 2016, pp. 67–69
- "Under the hammer: bench-marks of quality", Furniture & Cabinetmaking, issue 246, July 2016, pp. 50–52
- "Twice upon a time: reviving the vintage hand tool", Furniture & Cabinetmaking, issue 252, Winter 2016, pp. 52–54
- "Vintage tools: gathering ideas for a collection", Furniture & Cabinetmaking, issue 257, May 2017, pp. 58–61
- "Edward Preston", Furniture & Cabinetmaking, issue 258, June 2017, pp. 58–61
- "Spokeshaves: planing without a straight face", Furniture & Cabinetmaking, issue 260, August 2017, pp. 54–57
- "The Ultimatum brace: a feat of engineering", Furniture & Cabinetmaking, issue 264, December 2017, pp. 52–55
- "Gimlets galore!", Furniture & Cabinetmaking, issue 265, Winter 2017, pp. 50–53
- "David Stanley Sale", Furniture & Cabinetmaking, issue 266, January 2018, pp. 56–58
- "The plane and the ornate: the making of a European tradition", Furniture & Cabinetmaking, issue 267, February 2018, pp. 52–56
- "The making of the mitre plane", Furniture & Cabinetmaking, issue 270, May 2018, pp. 44–9
- "'There's magic in the web': auctioning woodworking tools in the digital age", Furniture & Cabinetmaking, issue 272, July 2018, pp. 58–60
- "The collector's guide to bow saws", Furniture & Cabinetmaking, issue 274, September 2018, pp. 58–60
- "Rooting out router planes", Furniture & Cabinetmaking, issue 277, December 2018, pp. 56–60
- "A symphony in three movements: selling tools at a David Stanley auction", Furniture & Cabinetmaking, issue 279, January 2019, pp. 47–49
- "Keeping within compass: a history of dividers", Furniture & Cabinetmaking, issue 281, March 2019, pp. 56–60
- "Happy recurrences – cyclical sales at a David Stanley auction", Furniture & Cabinetmaking, issue 283, May 2019, pp. 56–60
