= Stewart Spiers =

Scottish hand plane manufacturer

- Industry: Manufacturing
- Founded: 1840
- Headquarters: Ayr, and later Paisley Scotland
- Key people: Stewart Spiers (2 October 1820 – 19 July 1899); His daughters: Jane Stewart Spiers (1855–1941); Maria Carstairs Spiers (1858–1907); Mary Stewart Jackson (née Spiers) (1859–1948); Isabella Veness Spiers (1862–1901); Outside the family: Norman Eadie; William McNaught (b. 1869), foreman; John McFadyen (c. 1866–1928)
- Products: Hand planes for woodworking

Stewart Spiers was a small but innovative firm of plane-makers in Scotland, founded first of all in Ayr in Ayrshire and continuing under the registered name of Stewart Speirs Ltd [sic] in Paisley, Renfrewshire, from c. 1933 until its demise in the mid to late 1930s. Like the Glasgow firm of Alexander Mathieson & Sons, Spiers benefited hugely from the thriving industries on the Firth of Clyde in the latter half of the nineteenth century.

== Early years ==
Stewart followed his father William Spiers into the cabinet-making trade in Ayr, and when his father died in 1844 he apparently took over the workshop in River Street. He was later to claim 1840 as the year his plane-making firm began. How Stewart came to be a plane-maker was, according to the Ayrshire Post, purely by accident, however. He is said to have bought a rough casting in Edinburgh for 1/6, finished it at home and sold it to a local cabinet-maker for 18/-. This supposedly was the beginning of what soon became a successful operation in which he was selling his planes in Glasgow and Edinburgh and as far afield as North America, yet this was still little more than a sideline to his cabinet-making. Only much later did he become a full-time plane-maker.

=== Growth of the business ===
Beginning at River Street in his father's workshop, Stewart moved his work premises round the corner to 12 Garden Street in around 1850 and later, by 1858, had moved to premises at 11 River Street, where the firm stayed until around the time of Stewart's death in 1899, before its removal to 2–4 River Terrace at the end of Auld Brig.

Unlike Alexander Mathieson & Sons, the firm of Spiers remained small. The 1851 Census notes Stewart as a master cabinet-maker employing two men and two apprentices; the 1871 Census records that he had one man and two boys working for him.

Notwithstanding the story of the first plane he sold being a cast one, almost without exception the firm's early planes were dovetailed, many with screwed sides and many with the lever cap and screw system for holding the cutter. The Garden Street leaflet published in the 1850s shows a wide array of infill planes available: panel, rebate (single and double iron), mitre (with snecked iron), smoothing and joining planes, some with wedged cutters and others with lever and cap. Later in the century bull-nose rebates planes were developed by Spiers, and shoulder, chariot and thumb planes were also added to the range. Gun-metal was introduced for making plane sides and lever caps.

== Later years of the firm ==
In the 1890s Stewart's daughter Isabella assumed responsibility and ran the business until her untimely death in 1901. The firm continued under the name of Stewart Spiers with Stewart's surviving three daughters forming a partnership with the businessman Norman Eadie. Of the three daughters only Jane Stewart Spiers was still living in Ayr at the time. She took on the mantle of responsibility with active support from Eadie. Her sister Maria Carstairs Spiers reportedly returned to Ayr to help steer the firm through the war years.

A pivotal role in the firm's destiny was played by William McNaught from shortly before the turn of the twentieth century possibly until the 1920s. He almost certainly had a hand in the experimental work that took place at the workshop in the face of competition from the mass-produced cheaper American models flooding the market. The Spiers 1909 patent application shows a design that led to the Plane-O-Ayr range of panel and jointing planes that probably came on the market around the time of the patent's acceptance in March 1910.

The first known advertisement for Plane-O-Ayr planes is in the 1912 catalogue of the London dealers, Richard Melhuish of Fetter Lane. It features smoothing, panel and jointing planes clearly of that patented Spiers design though not stated as such.

Some early Plane-O-Ayr smoothing, panel and jointing planes were fitted with a rudimentary mechanism providing vertical adjustment. During the First World War, Spiers made utilitarian models of the Plane-O-Ayr jointers with beech fittings and cast-iron lever caps.

=== After the First World War ===
The post-war climate was full of uncertainty and in the plane-making world there was evergrowing competition from the United States. The Spiers sisters decided to sell the business and in 1922 found a buyer in John McFadyen, a ship's engineer, but retained ownership of the premises at 2−4 River Terrace.

Under McFadyen the firm developed further the Plane-O-Ayr series and brought out a range of adjustable planes under the "Empire" label. When McFadyen died in 1928, the business came under the control of John McFadyen & Co (Paisley) Ltd, a firm of motor and general engineers. By 1933, the firm had moved to Paisley, trading under the registered name of Stewart Speirs Ltd, with the 'e' and the 'i' of the surname reversed. William McNaught did not make the move to Paisley but went back to his old trade as a joiner. Stewart Spiers's signature was now being used as registered trade-mark. In spite of the production of a catalogue in around 1930 in which the range of planes was clearly promoted, and in spite of continuing innovation in design, the firm was closed down in 1936 or 1937.

== Trade-marks ==
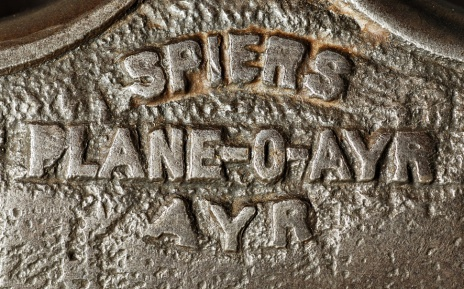
The Plane-O-Ayr mark on the lever cap of a Spiers jointer plane

- Upside down mark of "SPIERS AYR". Evidence suggests that this mark was used on early planes of the 1840s and 1850s and the mark the right way up from the late 1850s, though this is not absolutely consistent
- "PLANE-O-AYR" first appeared as an incuse mark sometimes accompanied with PAT APPL^{D}. FOR. Later the mark was embossed
- "SPIERS EMPIRE" set in an elliptical shape in Norris style
- Stewart Spiers in manuscript was registered as a trade-mark, in all likelihood during the period of transition of the firm to Paisley, appearing on the opening spread of the c. 1930 catalogue

== Awards at world's fairs ==
It is not known whether Stewart Spiers won any awards at world's fairs. However, it is said that as a young man he attended the Great Exhibition in London in 1851.

== Legacy ==
In the c. 1930 catalogue the claim was made that Stewart Spiers was the inventor and original maker of steel dovetailed planes. Such an assertion is somewhat exaggerated, but nevertheless it is without doubt that he contributed to the perfecting of metal planes, a legacy the firm continued to build on right up to its demise. In his tribute to Stewart Spiers the man, Nigel Lampert wrote: "Although others made metal planes before him, he was effectively the 'father' of the British metal planemaking trade."

== Bibliography ==
- Adamson, John. "Two great Scottish tool-makers", Furniture & Cabinetmaking, no. 223, October 2014, ISSN 1365-4292, pp. 58–62
- Lampert, Nigel. Through Much Tribulation: Stewart Spiers and the Planemakers of Ayr, Pascoe Vale, Victoria: Oliver Publications (1998) ISBN 978-0-646-36426-1 OCLC 42842538 This book reproduces both the 1909 and the c. 1930 Spiers catalogues.
- Roberts, Kenneth D. Scottish and English Metal Planes Manufactured by Stewart Spiers and Manufactured by T. Norris & Son, Fitzwilliam, NH: K. Roberts Publishing Co., rev. edn. 1991 ISBN 9780913602690 OCLC 37008196
- Russell, David R. "Stewart Spiers, Ayr" in Russell, David R.; with photography by James Austin and foreword by David Linley. Antique Woodworking Tools: Their Craftsmanship from the Earliest Times to the Twentieth Century, Cambridge: John Adamson (2010) ISBN 978-1-898565-05-5 OCLC 727125586, pp. 437–45
- Spiers, Stewart, Iron Plane Maker. Catalogue of Wrought iron, Steel, and Gunmetal Planes Manufactured by Stewart Spiers, Iron Plane Maker, Ayr: Stewart Spiers, 1909
- Spiers, Stewart, Iron Plane Manufacturers. Spiers Planes: Mild Steel; Malleable Iron; Gunmetal; Iron Planes (catalogue), Paisley and Ayr: Stewart Spiers, c. 1930
