= Brace (tool) =

Type of hand drill

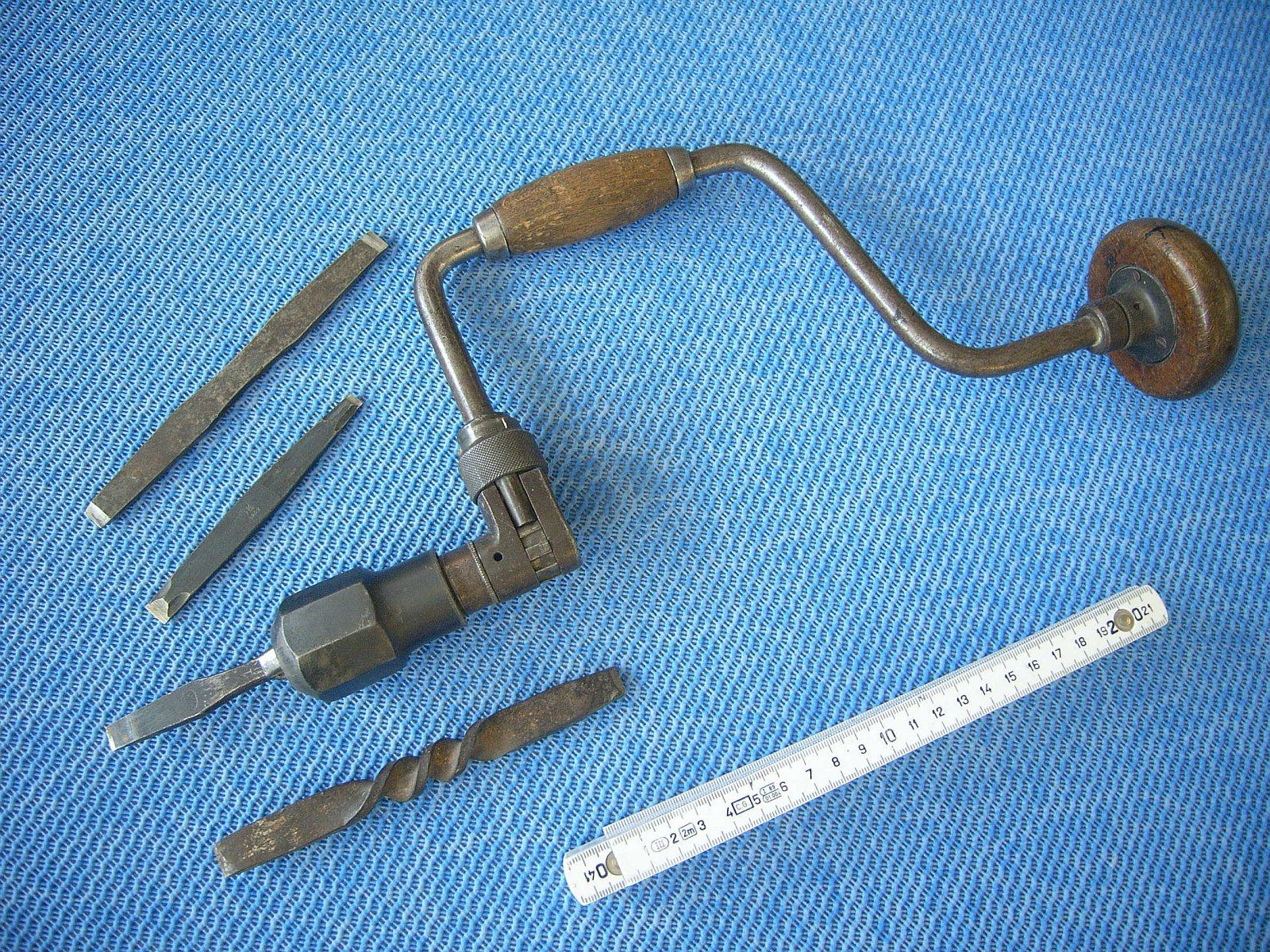
A brace with various bits

A brace is a hand tool used with a bit (drill bit or auger) to drill holes, usually in wood. Pressure is applied to the top while the handle is rotated. If the bit's lead and cutting spurs are both in good working order, the user should not have to apply any pressure other than for balance: the lead will pull the bit through the wood. The earliest carpenter's braces equipped with a U-shaped grip, that is with a compound crank, appeared between 1420 and 1430 in Flanders.

== Types ==
Bits used to come in a variety of types but the more commonly used Ridgeway and Irwin-pattern bits also rely on a tip called a snail, which is a tapered threaded screw that pulls the bit forward.

== Handle ==
The U-shaped handle is a crank. It gives the brace much greater torque than other kinds of hand-powered drills. A brace and bit can be used to drill wider and deeper holes than can a geared hand-powered drill. The cost of the greater torque is lower rotational speed; it is easy for a geared hand drill to achieve a rotational speed of several hundred revolutions per minute, while it would require considerable effort to achieve even 100 rpm with a brace.

== Spindle ==
The front of the brace consists of a chuck spindle with V-shaped brackets or clamps inside. Turning the spindle of the chuck in a clockwise direction tightens the drill bit in the chuck; turning counterclockwise loosens the bit for removal.

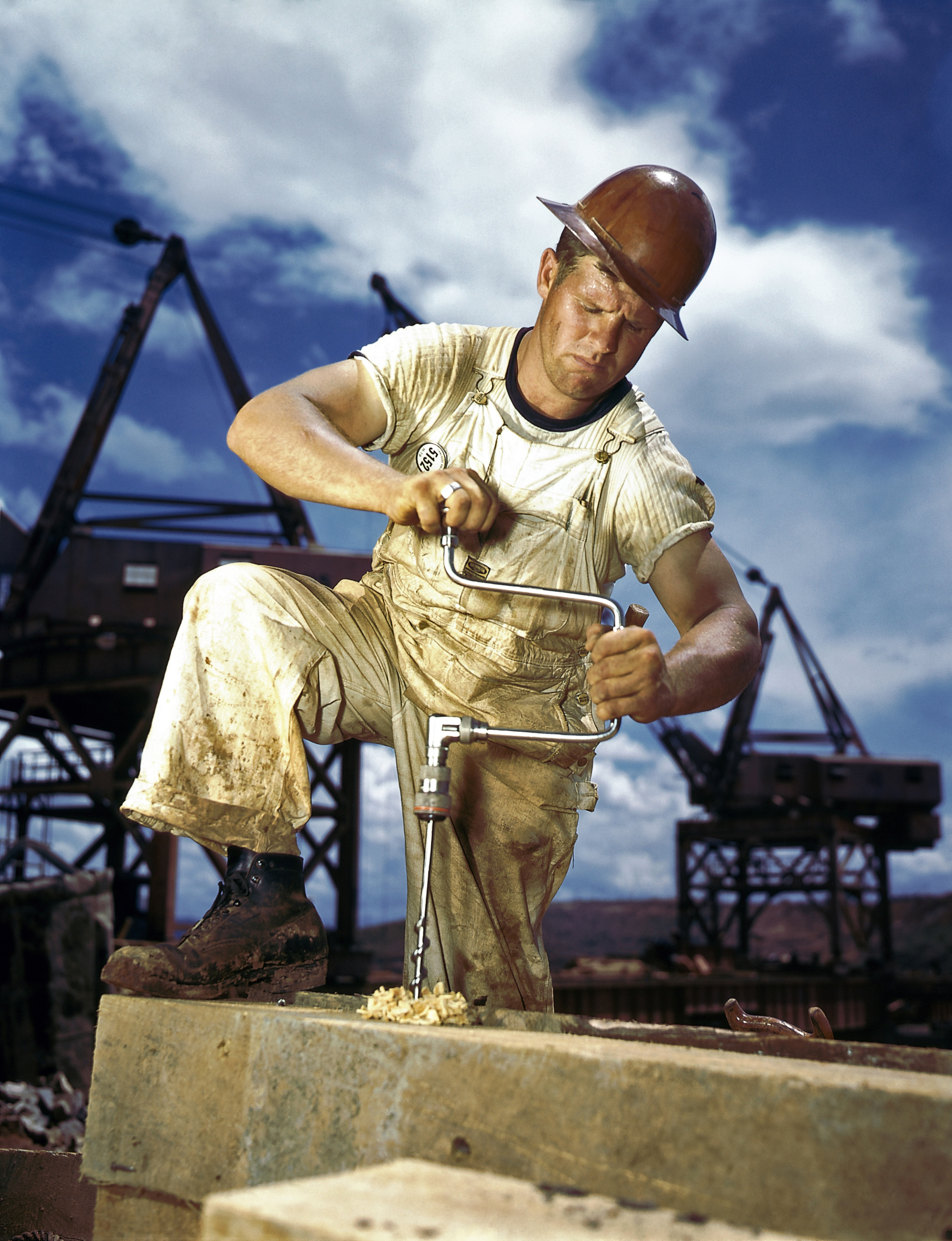
A carpenter using a brace

The U-shaped crank has a wooden spindle on it and—along with the top spindle—is allowed to freely turn under the hands without stressing the hands, thus preventing blisters.

== Gear release ==
In most modern braces, immediately behind the chuck is a three position gear release that allows ratcheting of the handle when in tight spots. Turning the gear release from the center position allows ratcheting the brace in the required direction. Turning the gear release fully clockwise lets it remove wood in a clockwise direction with the ratchet action going counterclockwise. Placing the gear release fully counterclockwise allows turning the brace and bit in a counterclockwise direction, usually to remove the drill bit from the hole. The center position of the gear release prohibits the ratcheting effect.

== Alternative names ==
The brace has other names. Bit brace is the most often used name, but carpenter's brace, ratchet brace (if a ratchet mechanism is incorporated into the design), and swing brace are also commonly used.

== See also ==
- Hand drills for some related tools, including the type sometimes known as a wheel brace.

== General and cited references ==
- Adamson, John, "The Ultimatum brace: a feat of engineering", Furniture & Cabinetmaking, issue 264, December 2017, pp. 52–5
- Eaton, Reg (1989). The Ultimate Brace: A Unique Product of Victorian Sheffield. King's Lynn: Erica Jane Publishing ISBN 978-0-9514695-0-7 OCLC 21348455
- Russell, David R., with Robert Lesage and photographs by James Austin, cataloguing assisted by Peter Hackett (2010). Antique Woodworking Tools: Their Craftsmanship from the Earliest Times to the Twentieth Century Cambridge: John Adamson ISBN 978-1-898565-05-5, "Boring tools: drills and braces", pp. 459–90
- White, Lynn Jr. (1962). Medieval Technology and Social Change. Oxford: At the Clarendon Press.
