= Holtzapffel =

- Industry: Manufacturing
- Founded: 1794
- Headquarters: London, England
- Key people: John Jacob Holtzapffel (1768–1835); Francis Rousset; Johann Georg Deyerlein (d. 1826); Charles Holtzapffel (1806–1847); Amelia Holtzapffel; John Jacob Holtzapffel II (1836–1897); George William Budd (1857–1924); John George Holtzapffel Budd (1888–1968)
- Products: Lathes and hand tools

The Holtzapffel dynasty of tool and lathe makers was founded in Long Acre, London by a Strasbourg-born turner, Jean-Jacques Holtzapffel, in 1794. The firm specialized in lathes for ornamental turning but also made a name for its high-quality edge and boring tools.

== Background ==
John Jacob Holtzapffel (1768–1835) English school, c. 1805

Moving to London from Alsace in 1792, Jean-Jacques worked initially in the workshop of the scientific-instrument maker Jesse Ramsden, anglicizing his name to John Jacob Holtzapffel. In 1794 he set up a tool-making partnership in Long Acre with Francis Rousset, trading under the name of John Holtzapffel. From 1804 he was in partnership with the Mannheim-born Johann Georg Deyerlein until the latter's death in 1826, trading under the name Holtzapffel & Deyerlein.

== Operations ==
Holtzapffel sold his first lathe in June 1795, for £25-4s-10d, an enormous price at the time. All of Holtzapffel's lathes were numbered and by the time he died in 1835, about 1,600 had been sold. The business was located at 64 Charing Cross, London from 1819 until 1901 when the site was required "for building purposes". The firm then moved to 13 and 14 New Bond Street, and was in premises in the Haymarket from 1907 to 1930.

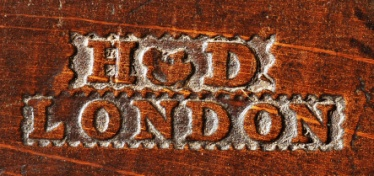
Mark of Holtzapffel & Deyerlein on the toe of a moulding plane

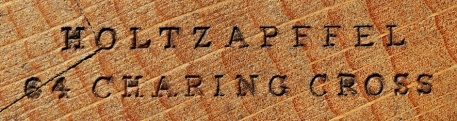
Mark of Holtzapffel on the toe of a moulding plane

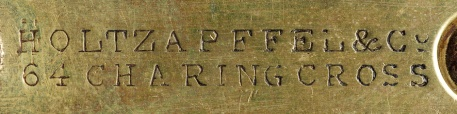
Mark of Holtzapffel & Co. above the button on the pad of a plated brace

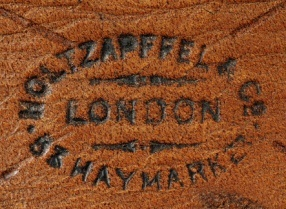
Mark of Holtzapffel & Co., 53 Haymarket, on the inside of the leather pouch of a travelling tool kit

== Maker's marks ==
The firm's marks come in a wide array of styles. Among the most noteworthy are the marks at the time of John Jacob Holtzapffel's partnership with Johann Georg Deyerlein, the marks showing the Charing Cross address and those showing the address in the Haymarket.

== The turning manuals ==
John's son, Charles Holtzapffel (1806–1847) joined the firm in 1827, at around which time the firm became known as Holtzapffel & Co. Charles continued to run the business after his father's death. He set about writing a treatise entitled Turning and Mechanical Manipulation, eventually running to some 2,750 pages, and which came to be regarded as the bible of ornamental turning. The first volume was published in 1843, but the final two volumes were completed and published after his death by his son, John Jacob Holtzapffel (1836–1897). There is some evidence to suggest that Francis Ronalds assisted Charles in the early stages of preparing the treatise. Typeset sections survive of an unfinished "Turner's Manual" that Ronalds wrote in 1837 and there is marked similarity in the two prefaces and elsewhere. Ronalds and Charles also collaborated on developing lathe accessories.

== Later years ==
When Charles Holtzapffel died in 1847 his wife Amelia ran the business until 1853. John Jacob II, the son of Charles and Amelia, was head of the firm from 1867 until 1896. A nephew of John Jacob II, George William Budd (1857–1924) became head of the firm in 1896. His son John George Holtzapffel Budd (1888–1968) later ran the business. By the early twentieth century, ornamental turning was going out of fashion, and the firm sold its last lathe in 1928.

== Awards at world's fairs ==
The cover of the Holtzapffel c. 1903 catalogue shows medals won at world's fairs and exhibitions in 1851 (3), 1862, 1884, 1885 (International Inventions Exhibition), 1887.

== Bibliography ==
- Holtzapffel & Co. Lathes, Turning Tools, Tool Cupboards, Chucks, &c, London: Holtzapffel & Co. (c. 1903), illustrated catalogue
- Holtzapffel, Charles. Turning and Mechanical Manipulation, London: Holtzapffel & Co. (vol. 1 1843; vol. 2 1846; vol. 3 published posthumously 1850)
- Holtzapffel, Charles and John Forbes Royle. Descriptive catalogue of the woods commonly employed in this country for the mechanical and ornamental arts, London: Holtzapffel & Co. (1852) OCLC 793593240
- Holtzapffel, John Jacob. Turning and Mechanical Manipulation, London: Holtzapffel & Co. (vol. 4 1879; vol. 5 1884)
- Holtzapffel, John Jacob. Hand or Simple Turning: Principles and Practice, London: Holtzapffel & Co. (1881), reissued Dover Publications Inc (1976), ISBN 978-0-486-23365-9
- Holtzapffel, John Jacob. The Principles and Practices of Ornamental or Complex Turning, London: Holtzapffel & Co. (1894), reissued Dover Publications Inc (1973), ISBN 978-0-486-22965-2
- Russell, David R., "John Jacob Holtzapffel and the founding of a tool-making dynasty" in David R. Russell, James Austin (photography), David Linley (foreword), Antique Woodworking Tools: Their Craftsmanship from the Earliest Times to the Twentieth Century, Cambridge: John Adamson (2010) ISBN 978-1-898565-05-5 OCLC 727125586, pp. 362–76
- Russell, David R., with John Adamson, "The great plane-makers: The history behind the Holtzapffel dynasty", Furniture & Cabinetmaking, issue 222, September 2014, ISSN 1365-4292, pp. 58–62 (updated summary taken from David Russell's book)
