= Paul de Lamerie =

London-based silversmith (1688 – 1751)

- Born: 9 April 1688 's-Hertogenbosch
- Died: 1 August 1751 (aged 63); London
- Burial place: St Anne's Church, Soho
- Occupation: Silversmith

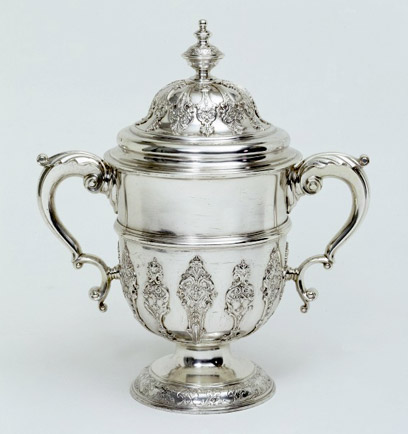
Cup and Cover, made by Paul de Lamerie, 1736–7 Victoria and Albert Museum no. 819-1890

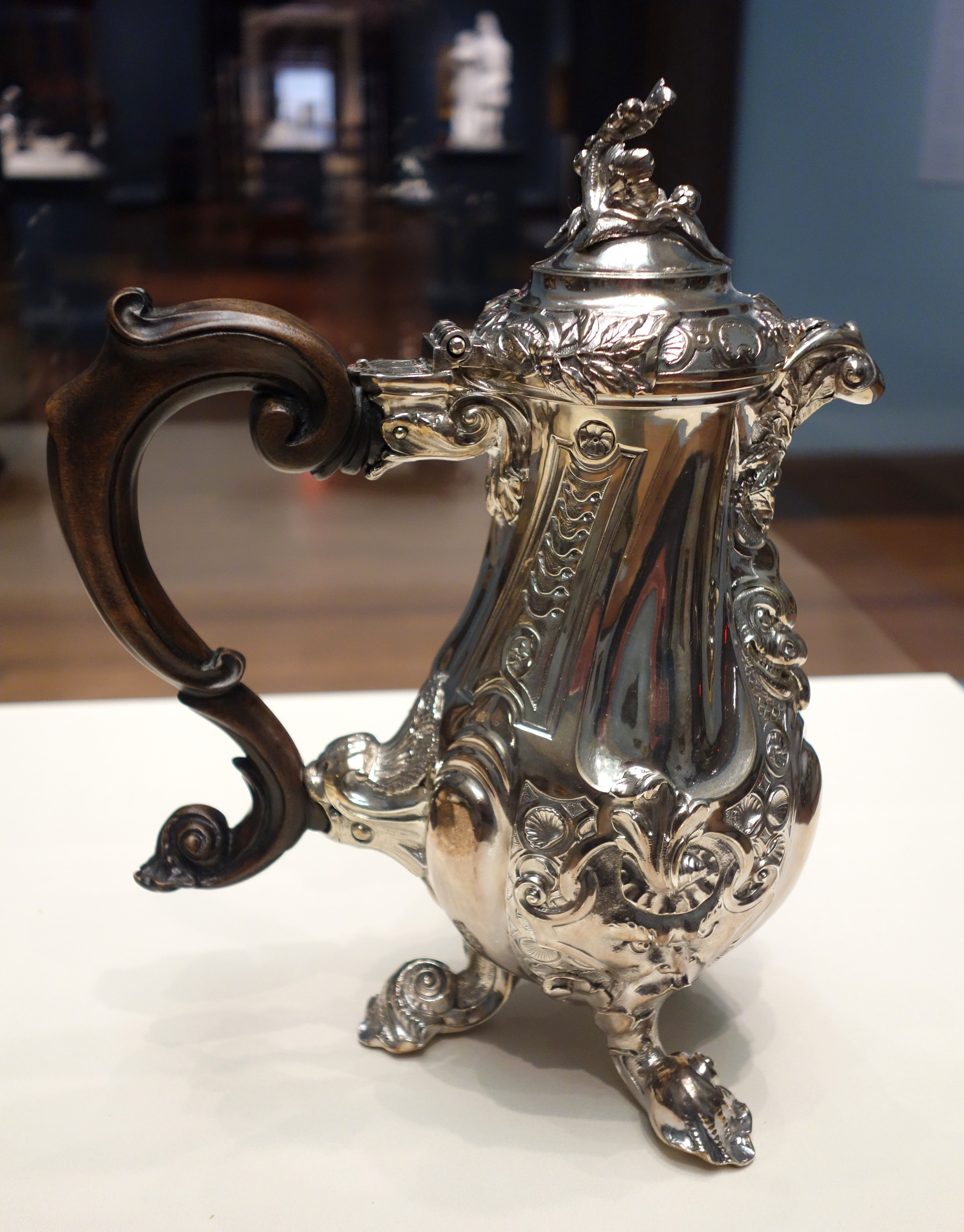
Rococo coffee jug, 1738

Paul Jacques de Lamerie (9 April 1688 – 1 August 1751) was a London-based silversmith. The Victoria and Albert Museum describes him as the "greatest silversmith working in England in the 18th century". He was being referred to as the "King's silversmith" in 1717. Though his mark raises the market value of silver, his output was large and not all his pieces are outstanding. The volume of work bearing de Lamerie's mark makes it almost certain that he subcontracted orders to other London silversmiths before applying his own mark.

== Early and private life ==
De Lamerie was born in 's-Hertogenbosch in the United Provinces (now the Netherlands). He was the son of a minor French nobleman, Paul Souchay de la Merie, a Huguenot who left France following the Edict of Fontainebleau in 1685. His father became an officer in the army of William III of Orange and moved to London in 1689 during the Glorious Revolution but died a pauper in 1735.

He married Louisa Juliott on 11 February 1717. They had two sons and four daughters together; three daughters survived.

Paul de Lamerie died in London and was buried at St Anne's Church, Soho. There is a memorial plaque at the site of his workshop, 40 Gerrard Street, which was unveiled on 16 January 1992.

== Career ==
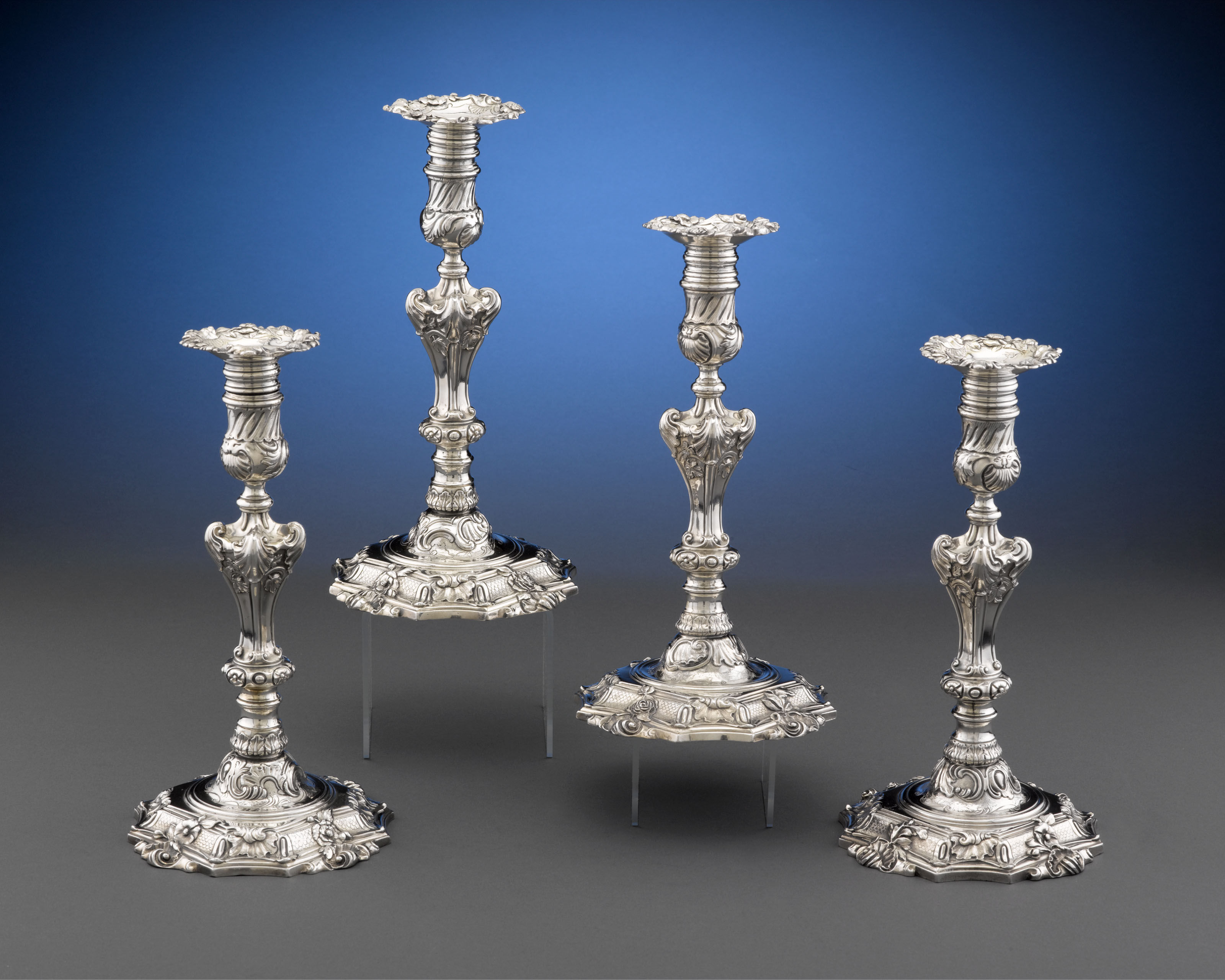
Silver Candlesticks by Paul de Lamerie. Hallmarked London, circa 1747-49

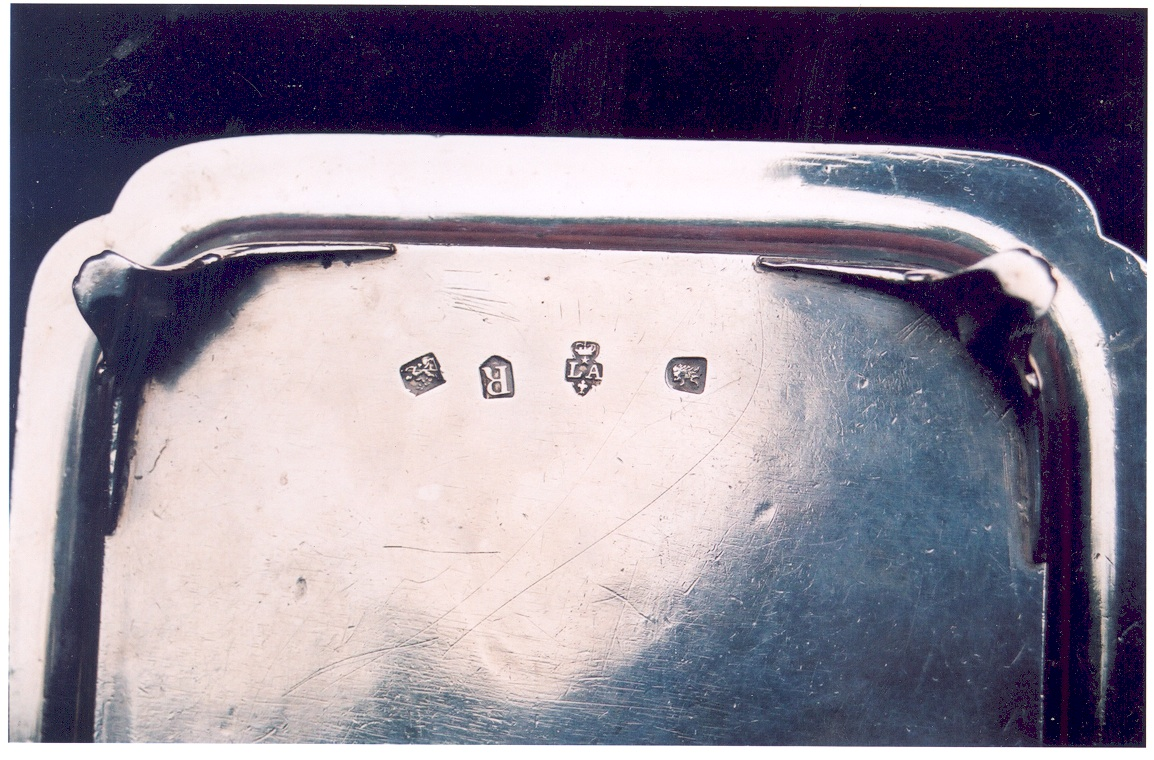
Lamerie's maker's mark for 1732 on the underside of a Britannia gauge waiter

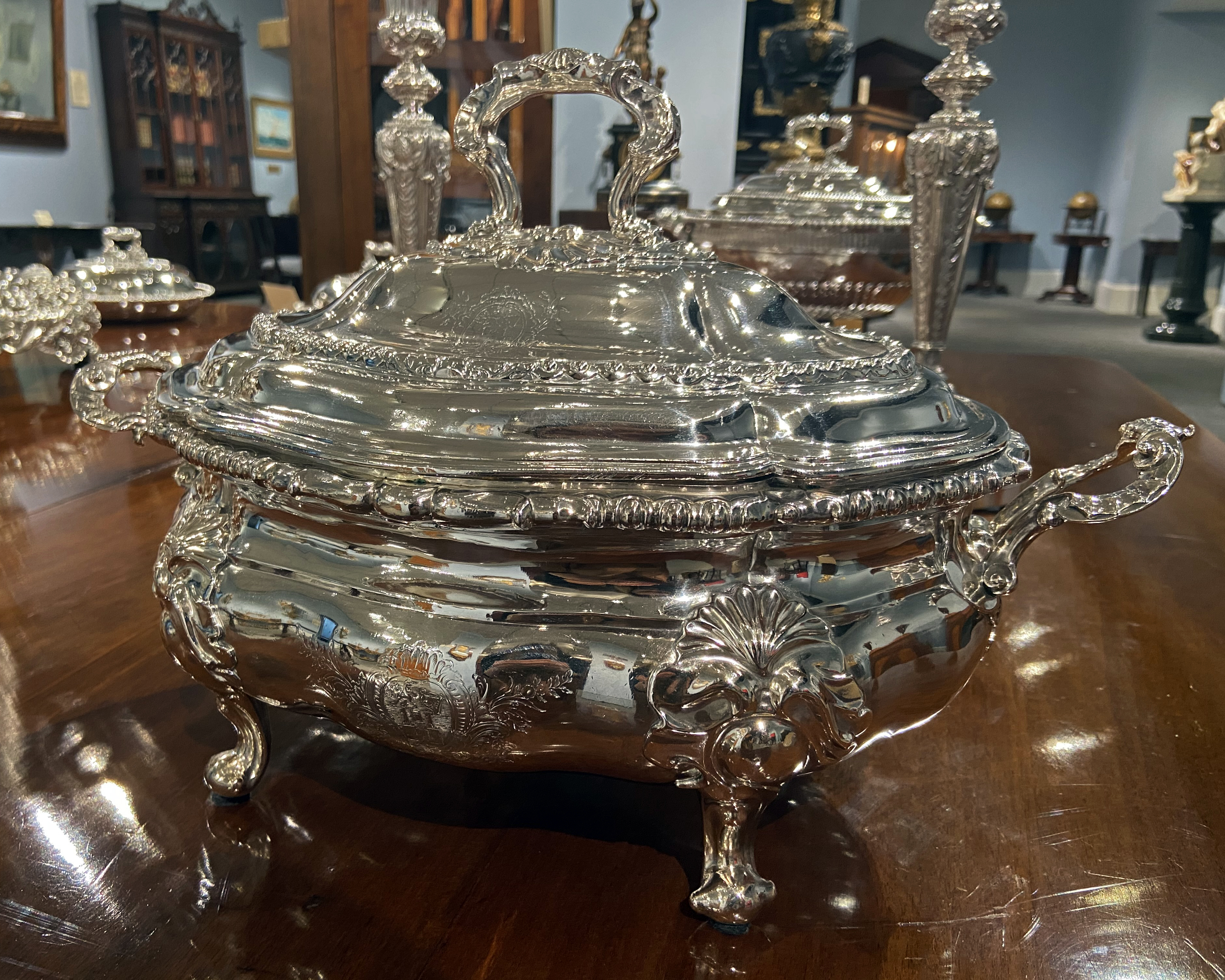
Soup tureen with the crest of Trinity College

In August 1703, de Lamerie became the apprentice to a London goldsmith of Huguenot origin, Pierre Platel (1659–1739). De Lamerie opened his own workshop in 1713 and was appointed goldsmith to George I in 1716. He worked in partnership with Ellis Gamble - formerly apprentice to Master William Hogarth - between 1723 and 1728. His early work is in the simple Queen Anne-styles, following classical French models, but de Lamerie is noted for his elaborate Rococo style of the 1730s, particularly the richly decorated works of an unidentified craftsman, the Maynard Master.

Leaving his first premises in Great Windmill Street he moved to 40 Gerrard Street in 1738. Here he lived and probably had his shop, his workshops being in one of the 48 properties he owned in the area.

His customers included Tsarinas Anna and Catherine, Count Aleksey Bobrinsky, Sir Robert Walpole, the Earl of Ilchester, the Earl of Thanet, Viscount Tyrconnel, the Duke of Bedford, and other members of the English aristocracy. He also worked for King John V of Portugal before losing favour to the Germains of Paris. One of his productions to the Portuguese Court was a huge solid silver bathtub lost in the great 1755 Lisbon earthquake.

He served on Goldsmiths' Company committees although never became Prime Warden. He also served as Captain and then Major in the Westminster Volunteers.

The Ashmolean Museum in Oxford has the Treby toilet service (29 pieces, London, 1724–1725).

A two-handled silver cup and cover by Paul de Lamerie, dated 1720, was among the wedding gifts of Queen Elizabeth II.

== Lawsuit ==
Famously, in 1722 a chimney sweep's boy sued de Lamerie after he found a jewel and took it to de Lamerie's shop to have it valued. When the boy asked for the jewel back, de Lamerie's apprentice only returned the socket of the jewel and not the stones. The King's Bench held that even though the boy did not have absolute ownership of the jewel, the boy had the right to keep it against all but the rightful owner. De Lamerie was ordered to return the jewel or pay the boy its value. His name was misspelled by the court reporter.

== See also ==
- Harache family

== Bibliography ==
- Philippa Glanville, "Lamerie, Paul Jacques de (1688–1751)", rev. Oxford Dictionary of National Biography, Oxford University Press, 2004 accessed
- Ellenor Alcorn, Beyond the Maker's Mark: Paul de Lamerie Silver in the Cahn Collection, Cambridge: John Adamson 2006 ISBN 978-0-9524322-6-5 OCLC 983882608.
- John F. Hayward, Huguenot Silver in England, 1688—1727. London 1959.
- P.A.S. Phillips, Paul de Lamerie, London 1935.
