= English Silver Before the Civil War =

2015 book by Timothy Schroder

- Jacket showing an earthenware pot, probably mid-16th-century Italian, with a silver-gilt mount made in London, 1558–9
- Author: Timothy Schroder
- Language: English
- Release number: 1st edition
- Subject: Silver, Reformation
- Published: Cambridge
- Publisher: John Adamson
- Publication date: 19 November 2015
- Publication place: United Kingdom
- Media type: Print
- Pages: 160
- ISBN: 978-1-898565-15-4
- OCLC: 929587926
- Dewey Decimal: 739.2
- LC Class: NK7143 .S36 2015
- Website: Book on publisher's website

English Silver Before the Civil War is Timothy Schroder's account of English domestic and church silver from a little before the Tudor age (1485–1603) to the threshold of the Civil War (1642–51).

Focusing on a private collection formed over the last thirty years, the book also "provides a general introduction to the silver trade and to dining customs of the period."

== Critical reception ==
Writing in The Art Newspaper, Tessa Murdoch praised the book's "accessible text, exemplary silver photography, elegant design and careful editing". Her remarks were reinforced by Kirstin Kennedy in her review in The Burlington Magazine: "Schroder’s clear, thoughtful account . . . marries object-based evidence with visual and documentary sources . . . The arguments of the text are supported by superb photographs . . . a clear layout and a detailed index." In Silver Magazine, Dorothea Burstyn commented favourably on the book's production: "As with all books published by John Adamson, this volume has a very pleasing and elegant layout with gorgeous photography." Philippa Glanville captured the book's quintessence when she wrote in Silver Studies: "From the first glance, the book is a celebration of the period, as well as of specific objects, and this shines through in every aspect."

== Author ==
Timothy Schroder is an English art historian, born in 1953. After graduating from Christ Church, Oxford and a year at the Victoria and Albert Museum, he joined the Silver Department at Christie's in 1976 and became Curator of Decorative Arts at LACMA in 1984. After returning to London, he was Curator of the Gilbert Collection at Somerset House, Prime Warden of the Goldsmith's Company, and a dealer and consultant. He has recently served as President of the Silver Society (London). Among his other books are: A Marvel to Behold: Gold and Silver at the Court of Henry VIII (Woodbridge: Boydell, 2020); The National Trust Book of English Domestic Silver, 1500–1900 (Penguin/Viking, 1988); as well as Renaissance and Baroque Silver, Mounted Porcelain and Ruby Glass in the Zilkha Collection and other catalogues of silver collections, including that of the Ashmolean Museum.
