= Antique tool =

Although an antique tool might be said to be one that is more than a hundred years old, the term is often used to describe any old tool of quality that might be deemed collectable.

The use of tools is one of the primary means by which humans are distinguished from other animals. Tools are the parents of all other antiques. Most man-made objects were made and great effort goes into the creation of newer and better tools to solve the production problems of today. The study of antique tools provides a glimpse of human development and cultural preferences history.

The creation of a tool often makes possible the creation of more advanced tools. Advanced tools made possible the manufacture of internal-combustion engines, automobiles, and computers. Among those who like to collect, some may do so as part of a rigorous study program – they want to catalog all types of a specific tool, for example. Some collectors may wish to preserve some of the past for future generations, others fall under the spell of the beauty of some antique tools.

== Collecting categories ==
Categories of tools range from the broad – planes, rules, braces, hammers, etc. to the specific – planes made by the Gage Company of Vineland, New Jersey, for example. People who are new to the hobby should know that there are many good modern reference books that will guide you in your search, as well as many reprints of the catalogs in which these tools were originally offered. Often tools will exhibit differences contrasting the different locations of their makers, or different features contrasting different time periods.

The following are some ways people collect tools:

- Tools of a specific company or maker – for example, L. Bailey Victor tools, Seneca Falls Tool Company tools, Miller's Falls tools, Disston Saws, Chelor planes, 1940s Skilsaw model 77, etc.
- Tools of a specific type – hammers, braces, axes, saws, patented planes, transitional planes, treadle-powered machines, etc.
- Tools of a specific period – tools from 1850 to 1900, post-World War II era tools, etc.
- Tools from a specific place – Scottish tools, tools from Massachusetts makers, etc.
- Tools of a specific occupation – cooper's tools, machinist tools, watchmaker's tools, garden tools.
- A combination of one or more of the above categories — for example, one each of a specific type of Stanley tool, i.e. all Stanley saws, all Stanley marking gauges, all Stanley planes, etc.
- A "type study" of one specific model, for example, a type study of Stanley #6 jointer planes or Norris A5 smooth planes.
- Tools that show how a specific idea progressed over time, for example tools tracing the development of the plane's adjusting mechanisms, or tools showing how an early patent was bought out and developed by another company.
- Tool advertising and catalogs.

=== Sickles and scythes ===
Scythes are grass cutting tools with long handles for mowing large amounts of hay. The graceful shape of the scythes of the late 18th and early 19th centuries hinted at the grace and art required for using the tool properly. The blade was straighter than the sickle's, with an almost straight blade side and a gently curved blunt side. The handle, called a snath, would ordinarily be of a hardwood indigenous to the area of manufacture with small handholds, strategically placed, termed nibs. The earliest scythes had no nibs. Later scythes had two nibs. Used by an experienced hand, the scythe was an efficient tool, slicing through acres of green hay with methodic precision. Scythes were the prized possession of early Americans and, carefully protected from abuse and weather, they could last for centuries.

== List of collectors ==
- Ken Hawley
- Henry Chapman Mercer
- David R. Russell
- Raphael Salaman
- Eric Sloane

== See also ==
- Antique Woodworking Tools (book)
