= Alexander Mathieson & Sons =

Alexander Mathieson & Son(s)
- Industry: Manufacturing
- Founded: 1792
- Headquarters: Glasgow, Scotland
- Key people: John Manners; Alexander Mathieson (1797–1851); Thomas Adam Mathieson (1822–1899); James Harper Mathieson; Thomas Ogilvie Mathieson
- Products: Hand tools

The firm of Alexander Mathieson & Sons was one of the leading makers of hand tools in Scotland. Its success went hand in hand with the growth of the shipbuilding industries on the Firth of Clyde in the nineteenth century and the emergence of Glasgow as the "second city of the Empire". It also reflected the firm's skill in responding to an unprecedented demand for quality tools by shipyards, cooperages and other industries, both locally and far and wide.

== Early years ==
The year 1792 was deemed by the firm to be that of its foundation; it was in all likelihood the year in which John Manners had set up his plane-making workshop on Saracen('s) Lane off the Gallowgate in the heart of Glasgow, not far from the Saracen's Head Inn, where Dr. Johnson and James Boswell had stayed on their tour of Scotland in 1773.

Alexander Mathieson (1797–1851) is recorded in 1822 as a plane-maker at 25 Gallowgate, but in the following year at 14 Saracen's Lane, presumably having taken over the premises of John Manners. The 1841 national census described Alexander Mathieson as a master plane-maker at 38 Saracen Lane with his son Thomas Adam working as a journeyman plane-maker.

== Thomas Adam Mathieson ==
Gradually business grew and became more diversified, the Post-Office Glasgow Annual Directory recording that by 1847/8 Alexander Mathieson was a "plane, brace, bit, auger & edge-tool maker".

=== Edinburgh ===
In 1849 the firm of James & William Stewart at 65 Nicolson Street, Edinburgh was taken over and Thomas was put in charge of the business, trading under the name Thomas A. Mathieson & Co. as plane and edge-tool makers. Thomas's company acquired the Edinburgh edge-tool makers Charles & Hugh McPherson and took over their premises in Gilmore Street. In the Edinburgh directory of 1856/7 the business is recorded as being Alexander Mathieson & Son, plane and edge-tool makers at 48 Nicolson Street and at Paul's Work, Gilmore Street.

=== Growth of the Glasgow business ===
The 1851 census records that Alexander was working as a tool and plane-maker employing eight men. Later that year Alexander died and his son Thomas took over the business. Under the heading of edge-tool maker in the 1852/3 Post-Office Glasgow Annual Directory the firm is now listed as Alexander Mathieson & Son, with further lines as "turning-lathe and vice manufacturers" added. By the early 1850s the business had moved to 24 Saracen Lane. The directory for 1857/8 records that the firm had moved again only a few years later to East Campbell Street, also off the Gallowgate, and that through further diversification was also manufacturing coopers' and tinmen's tools. The ten-yearly censuses log the firm's growth: in 1861 Thomas was a tool manufacturer employing 95 men and 30 boys; in 1871 he had 200 men working for him; and in 1881 300 men. By 1899 the firm had been incorporated as Alexander Mathieson & Sons Ltd, notwithstanding the fact that only Alexander's son Thomas appears ever to have joined the firm.

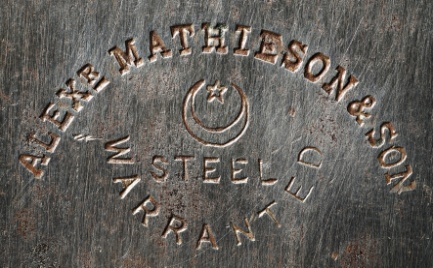
Crescent-and-star mark for Alexander Mathieson & Son, from a cap iron

=== Trade-mark ===
In September 1868 Thomas Mathieson put a notice in the Sheffield & Rotherham Independent and the Sheffield Daily Telegraph stating that his firm had used the trade-mark of a crescent and star "for some time" and that "using or imitating the Mark would be proceeded against for infringement". The firm had acquired its interest in the crescent-and-star mark from the heirs of Charles Pickslay, the Sheffield cutler who had registered it with the Cutlers' Company in 1833 and had died in 1852. The year 1868 seems also to be the one in which the name Saracen Tool Works was first adopted; not only does it figure at the foot of the notice in the Sheffield press, it also makes its first appearance in the firm's entry in the Post-Office Glasgow Annual Directory in the 1868/9 edition.

=== Public life ===
As Thomas Mathieson's business grew, so too did his involvement in local public life and philanthropy. One of the representatives of the third ward on the town council of Glasgow, he became a river bailie in 1868, a magistrate in 1870 and a preceptor of Hutcheson's Hospital in 1878. He had a passion for books and was an "ardent Ruskinian". He served on the committee handling the bequest for the setting up of the Mitchell Library in Glasgow. When he died at Coulter Maynes near Biggar in 1899, he left an estate worth £142,764. He is buried at the Glasgow Necropolis next to the cathedral.

== Later years of the firm ==
Both Thomas's sons, James Harper and Thomas Ogilvie, were involved in the continuing life of the firm. James followed in his father's footsteps in becoming a local public figure. He was appointed Deputy Lieutenant of the County of the City of Glasgow and was made a deacon of the Incorporation of the Hammermen of Glasgow in 1919. His brother Thomas Ogilvie was recorded as tool manufacturer and employer in the 1911 census. Thomas Ogilvie's son Thomas Alastair Sutherland Ogilvie "Taso" Mathieson born in 1908 took a rather different approach to engineering, however, by becoming a racing driver. In 1947 he wed the French film actress Mila Parély.

== Awards at world's fairs ==
- Great Exhibition, London, 1851. Prize medal for joiners' tools in the class of Cutlery & Edge Tools
- Great London Exposition, 1862. Prize medal honoris causa
- International Exhibition, Melbourne, 1880. Gold medal
- International Exhibition of Industry, Science and Art, Edinburgh, 1886. Prize medal

== Bibliography ==
- Mathieson. Illustrated Price List of Wood Working Tools Manufactured by Alex^{r} Mathieson & Sons Ltd. Glasgow: Alexander Mathieson & Sons Ltd (1899) OCLC 6480447
- Mathieson. Selections from the Illustrated Price List of Wood Working Tools: Manufactured by Alex^{r}. Mathieson & Sons, Ltd., Glasgow (Reprint, with documentary, of portions of the 1899 edition), Fitzwilliam, NH: Ken Roberts (1979) ISBN 9780913602324 OCLC 7516238
- Russell, David R.; with photography by James Austin and foreword by David Linley. Antique Woodworking Tools: Their Craftsmanship from the Earliest Times to the Twentieth Century, Cambridge: John Adamson (2010) ISBN 978-1-898565-05-5 OCLC 727125586
