= Hand tool =

Tool equipment powered manually

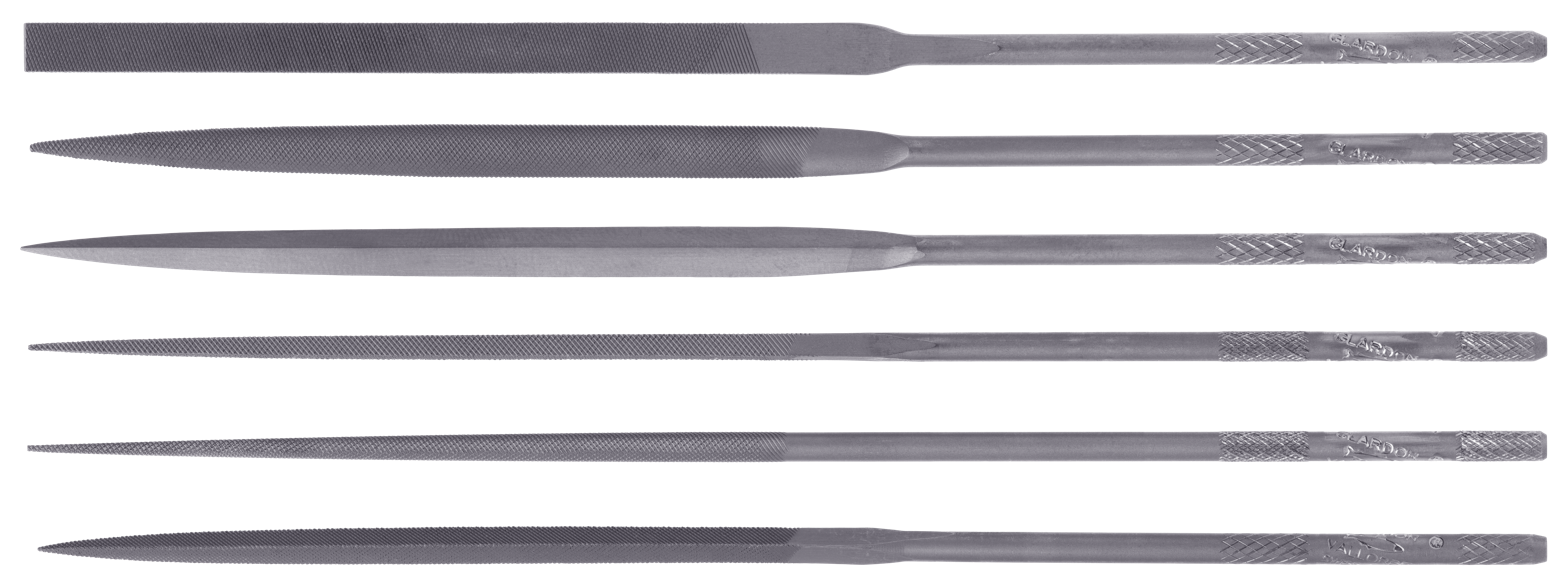
A needle file set

A hand tool is any tool that is powered by hand rather than a motor. Categories of hand tools include wrenches, pliers, cutters, files, striking tools, struck or hammered tools, screwdrivers, vises, clamps, snips, hacksaws, drills, and knives.

Outdoor tools such as garden forks, pruning shears, and rakes are additional forms of hand tools. Portable power tools are not hand tools.

== History ==
Hand tools have been used by humans since the Stone Age, when stone tools were used for hammering and cutting. During the Bronze Age, tools were made by casting alloys of copper and tin. Bronze tools were sharper and harder than those made of stone. During the Iron Age iron replaced bronze, and tools became even stronger and more durable. The Romans developed tools during this period some of which are similar to those being produced today. After the Industrial Revolution, most tools were made in factories rather than by craftspeople.

A large collection of British hand tools dating from 1700 to 1950 is held by St Albans Museum. Most of the tools were collected by Raphael Salaman (1906–1993), who wrote two classic works on the subject: Dictionary of Woodworking Tools and Dictionary of Leather-working Tools. David Russell's vast collection of Western hand tools from the Stone Age to the twentieth century led to the publication of his book Antique Woodworking Tools.

== General categories ==
The American Industrial Hygiene Association gives the following categories of hand tools: wrenches, pliers, cutters, striking tools, struck or hammered tools, screwdrivers, vises, clamps, snips, saws, drills and knives.

== See also ==
- Antique tool
- Category:Hand tools
- Cutting tool
- Garden tool
- List of hand tools
- List of timber framing tools
- List of tool-lending libraries
- Manual labour
- Surgical instrument
