= Charles Holtzapffel =

- Born: 1806
- Died: 1847 (aged 40–41)
- Occupations: Instrument maker, Author
- Notable work: Turning and Mechanical Manipulation
- Successor: Amelia Holtzapffel, John Jacob Holtzapffel II (son)
- Spouse: Amelia Holtzapffel
- Children: 2
- Father: Jean-Jacques Holtzapfell anglicized to John Jacob

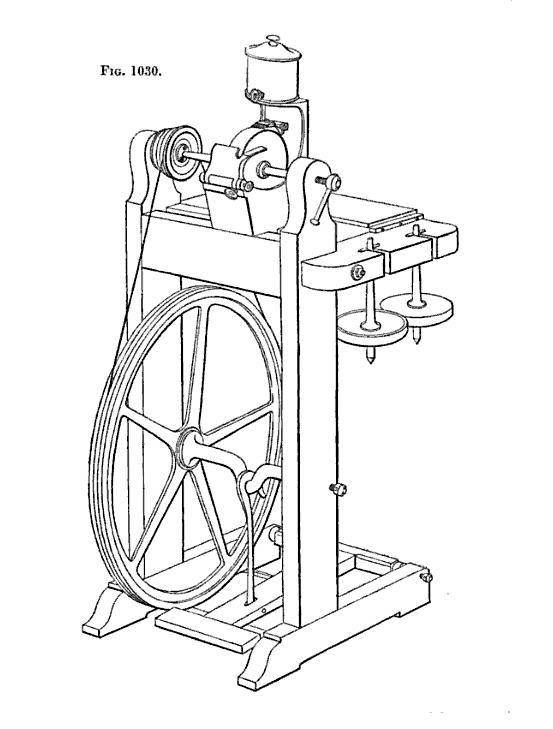
Small Grinder. Charles Holtzapffel, John J. (John Jacob). Holtzapffel

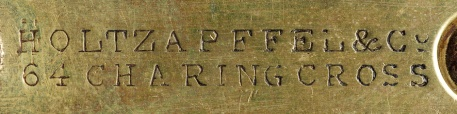
Mark of Holtzapffel & Co. above the button on the pad of a plated brace

Charles Holtzapffel (1806–1847) was a mechanical engineer and technical writer and one of the Holtzapffel dynasty of tool and lathe makers. He wrote a five volume treatise called Turning and Mechanical Manipulation, which is considered a blueprint for ornamental turning, with over 3000 pages and 1600 illustrations.

Charles was the son of John Jacob Holtzapffel, originally from Alsace who set up a tool-making partnership in Long Acre with Franic Rousset in 1793.

Charles was educated in England.

== Business ==
Charles joined his father's firm, Holtzapfell & Co. in 1827. The firm was based at 64, Charing Cross Road, with manufacturing at 127 Long Acre. After his father died in 1835, Charles continued to run the business. He also invented machinery for printing banknotes, lathes for cutting rosettes, and equipment for tracing shapes on glass and introduced a new system of measures based on the decimal sub-division of the standard inch, as a replacement for the method of measuring with gauges. A number of lathes and tools made by Charles are held at the Science Museum, London.

Charles died of liver disease in 1847 at the age of 41. His obituary was published in the Artizan journal and the Gentleman's magazine. By this time, Holtzapfell & Co. had sold about 1500 lathes. After his death, his wife Amelia ran the business until 1853 and his son John Jacob II from 1867 to 1896.

== Publications ==
In 1838 Charles published two books, and in 1827 started writing Turning and Mechanical Manipulation. The first two volumes were published in 1843, and the third published posthumously by Amelia in 1850. The last two volumes were completed after his death by his son, John Jacob II. All 5 volumes are held by the Science Museum, London, There is some evidence to suggest that Francis Ronalds assisted Charles in the early stages of preparing the treatise. Typeset sections survive of an unfinished "Turner's Manual" that Ronalds wrote in 1837 and there is marked similarity in the two prefaces and elsewhere. Ronalds and Charles also collaborated on developing lathe accessories.

Charles also published a number of other books and pamphlets, including one on printing apparatus, which is held by the Wellcome collection.

== Professional memberships ==
Member of the council of Institution of Civil Engineers.

Chairman of the Mechanic's Committee of the Society of Arts.
