= Pierre Harache =

English goldsmith

Pierre Harache (also known as Peter Harache) was an English goldsmith of French birth. On 21 July 1682 he became the first Huguenot goldsmith to be admitted to the Goldsmiths' Company in London. His surviving pieces show a simplicity of form with the ornament largely applied or engraved. Confusion often arises between the work of Pierre Harache and that of his son Pierre Harache (II) (born 1653; fl 1698–1717), as their registered marks are similar.

In 1639, Pierre Harache was born in Rouen, France, into the French Huguenot tradition of Protestant craftsmanship. In 1681, Harache arrived in England, where he established himself as a goldsmith and became known for his silverwork. In 1682, Harache was admitted to the Goldsmiths' Company, receiving its livery in 1687; he became known for producing cast silver candlesticks and served patrons including the dukes of Devonshire, Somerset and Marlborough.

== See also ==
- Harache family
