= Maine Antique Digest =

The Maine Antique Digest (M.A.D.) is an American newspaper covering antiques founded by Samuel Pennington in 1973. A trade newspaper, it is regarded as an important publication in the American and Canadian antiques market.
