= Kaywin Feldman =

American museum director

- Born: 1966 (age 59–60); Boston, Massachusetts, U.S.
- Education: BA, University of Michigan; MA, (archaeology) University of London; MA, (art history) University of London
- Occupation: Museum director
- Years active: 1994 to present
- Title: Director of the National Gallery of Art
- Term: 2019 to present

Kaywin Feldman is an American museum administrator and director of the National Gallery of Art in Washington, D.C. Named on December 11, 2018, Feldman took over from Earl A. Powell III in March 2019. She is the National Gallery of Art's first woman director.

== Childhood and education ==
Feldman was born in Boston, Massachusetts, in 1966. Feldman's father was in the military, and the family moved often. They lived in or near Boston; Cleveland, Ohio; Washington, D.C. (she attended high school in Silver Spring, Maryland), and London in the United Kingdom. She was exposed to many museums in her childhood, and developed an interest in archaeology. She obtained a bachelor's degree in classical archaeology from the University of Michigan and a master's degree from the Institute of Archaeology of the University of London. She also obtained a master's in art history from the University of London's Courtauld Institute of Art, writing her thesis on 16th-century Flemish art with a particular focus on representations of satyrs. While studying in London she worked at the British Museum.

== Professional career ==
When she was 28, Feldman became director of the Fresno Metropolitan Museum of Art and Science. From 1999 until 2007 Feldman was director of the Memphis Brooks Museum of Art. In 2008 she became director and president of the Minneapolis Institute of Art. During her tenure, she expanded the collection and attendance doubled. Digital access was emphasized, and social justice and equity programs were adopted. Upon being selected by the National Gallery, she resigned her offices at the Minneapolis Institute with her last day set on March 1, 2019, and assumed her new position in Washington ten days later. She is the NGA's first woman director.

Feldman previously served as president of the Association of Art Museum Directors and as chair of the American Alliance of Museums.

== Views on Women in the Arts ==
On February 4, 2020, Feldman participated in a public conversation at the Brooklyn Museum titled "Women Leaders in the Arts" during which she claimed that "art museums, the arts, and art faculties at universities" have become "so predominantly filled with women" that hiring men in these fields has become a priority. She added, "of course all studies show that when a profession becomes 'pink-collared,' whether you wear a pink collar or not, salaries go down." The Brooklyn Museum forum is one of at least four occasions when Feldman has stated publicly her view that too many women work in museums, where their growing presence threatens the status and compensation of museum professionals.

Although Feldman has publicly argued on multiple occasions that the growing proportion of women in art museums threatens compensation levels in the field, this claim has been contested by subsequent scholarship. A 2018 study by sociologist Felix Busch, examining U.S. census data from 1960 to 2010, found that occupational wage erosion linked to feminization had been steadily declining since the mid-twentieth century, varied considerably across professions, and was driven primarily by historical gender stereotypes rather than current workforce composition. Paula England, a co-author of the longitudinal study Feldman cited in support of her position, subsequently stated that findings about gender-based devaluation of occupations "should never be used as a reason to discriminate against women trying to enter the field." Preferential hiring of men over women in employment decisions is prohibited under Title VII of the Civil Rights Act of 1964.
