= Harache family =

Huguenot goldsmith family

The Harache family is a family of goldsmiths of Huguenot extraction, many of whom came to London from France towards the end of the 17th century to avoid persecution. They were responsible for some of England’s most important silversmithing of the time. The family was active in the production of silver plate in London for about a hundred years.

== Nicolas Harache ==
The revocation of the Edict of Nantes (1598) in October 1685 by Louis XIV, the grandson of Henry IV, drove an exodus of Protestants out of France, and increased the hostility of Protestant nations toward France. The Harache family immigrated to London, England because of this persecution of Protestants.

It appears that the first member of the Harache family to make the journey to London as a result of persecution, was Nicolas. He came with his wife, Marie Mascrier, and their daughter Marie, sometime between August 1667 and November 1668. Their son, Thomas, was born in London in 1668 and his name appears in the baptismal list for Threadneedle Street church dated 29 November. So far, no records have been discovered, either in Rouen or in London, that prove Nicolas was a master goldsmith. There is no record of his work or where he and his family lived, although the church where his son was baptized indicates that he had taken up residence in the general area that was later occupied by the members of the family who followed him to England.

There appear to be no burial records of Nicolas but it must be assumed that he died in late 1676 or early 1677, because in the latter year, Marie returned to Rouen, where she remarried on 28 October 1677. Her new husband was Jean Lefebvre, who does not appear to be directly related to the Lefebvre family, some of whose members later were apprenticed to Peter Harache.

Eleven years later, in 1688, Marie made the return trip to London, bringing her husband and family with her. The records of Threadneedle Street church show that on 20 May 1688 ‘Marie Masserier, wife of Jean Lefévre of Rouen, Thomas Harache of Rouen, and Marie Harache of Rouen,’ all ‘presented themselves to make reconnaissance’ at ‘The French church of London’.

== Madeleinne and Pierre Harache ==
Next to arrive was Madeleinne Harache, who was married to a Parisian goldsmith named Edouard Hobbema. They arrived in 1675. The most famous member of the family was Madeleinne’s brother, Pierre Harache (the elder). He was born in Rouen, in 1639, and was baptized at Quevilly, the principal Huguenot church of the city, on September 25.

Pierre arrived in England in October 1681 and appears together with his wife Anne in the denization list dated 26 June 1682. He was made free of the Goldsmiths’ Company Worshipful Company of Goldsmiths on 21 July 1682 and took Simon Pantin as his apprentice in 1686. Although a Sterling mark has been attributed to him dating from his freedom, the only certain mark recorded for him was entered at Goldsmiths’ Hall as a largeworker (producing candlesticks and hollowware) in 1697, when he gave his address as ‘Suffolk Street near Chairing (sic) Cross’. He remained there until his death in 1712. Although there is no record showing that Pierre Harache (the elder) was ever in receipt of Royal Bounty, it is not clear whether he continued to fulfill commissions until his death. However, at least one piece has been identified bearing his mark and dated 1705.

Pierre Harache’s work is of the highest standard in both design and execution. He used cut card work and applied decoration as well as engraving much of which has been attributed to Blaise Gentot (1658–1700). He enjoyed the patronage of the greatest clients of the day and was rivaled only by his fellow, Huguenot David Willaume.

== Anne Harache ==
Although not common, it was not unknown for women in the Harache family to be practising goldsmiths in their own right; Heal’s reference to “Mrs. Harache, silversmith, corner of Great Suffolk Street, 1699” may well have been correct, since Pierre’s wife, Anne, appears in the denization list of 1682, giving her the right to trade in her own name. This would explain the reference to Madame Anne Harache supplying a Monsieur Grandmaison with a pair of silver candlesticks in Paris in 1668 (Archives Nationales Z1B 517) and a similar reference to Mrs. Ann Harache supplying a silver plate weighing 172 oz to the Duke of Somerset in 1690.

== Jean Harache ==
The next member of the family to come to London was Jean Harache, who was born in 1655 and baptized at Quevilly on 30 May (Societe du Parler Français). He was in England by 16 December 1687 (Huguenot Society Quarto Series, 18, p. 198). There is no mark recorded for him at that date although the mark registered by his son, Jean Harache II, in 1726, appears on smallwork of the late 17th century. His address is given as Riders Court. He died in 1734. He was in receipt of Royal Bounty from 1722.

== Jean Harache II ==
Jean Harache II was born in 1698 (Huguenot Society Quarto Series, 29, p. 64), the son of Jean Harache, and the likelihood is that he was apprenticed to his father although no record of this has, as yet, been found. He was describing himself as a jeweler when he gave testimony in a Chancery case in 1722 and he too gave his address as Riders Court, at that time having been there ‘near 25 years’. The mark recorded in the smallworkers’ register at Goldsmiths’ Hall in 1726 against the name Jean Harache, though appearing on plate of the late 17th century and thus that of Jean (I), must have been that of Jean (II) at this date.

== Jeremy Harache and brothers ==
Jeremy Harache arrived in England by 16 September 1683 (Huguenot Society Quarto Series,, 21, p. 136). He was born in Rouen in 1654 and was baptized at Le Grand-Quevilly on 26 May. Neither his mark nor examples of his work have, as yet, been identified and he returned to France in 1697, where he died before 1702.

Jeremy was followed in 1686 by his brothers Pierre Harache (junior) and Abraham. Pierre Harache (junior) was baptised at Quevilly 11 April 1653 (Societe du Parler Français) and was only distantly related to Pierre Harache (the elder). He was endenizened 29 September 1698, possibly having worked as a journeyman for his namesake until then, and was made free of the Goldsmiths’ Company 24 October 1698. He entered three marks at Goldsmiths’ Hall as a largeworker 25 October 1698 giving his address as Compton Street (Mark Book-Goldsmiths' Hall, London). In 1703 he took Jacques des Rumeaux as his apprentice but was in receipt of Royal Bounty between 1714 and 1717, when he returned to France, giving his address at that time as Grafton Street. He died in France in 1718.

Following the recent discovery of the date of death of Pierre Harache (the elder) and a reassessment of the marks of both Pierres, many important works previously attributed to the younger man have been re-attributed to the elder, including the wine cistern of 1704 belonging to the Worshipful Company of Barbers, Barber-Surgeons Hall, Monkwell Square, Wood Street, London and the Methuen Dish of 1703 at the Ashmolean Museum at Oxford.

== Abraham Harache ==
Abraham Harache was born in 1661 and was baptized at Quevilly on 9 October. He, like his brother, was a master goldsmith by the time he arrived in London although he appears to have been a smallworker (producing mostly spoons and snuff boxes). He had arrived in London by 22 August 1686 but was not endenizened until March 1700 and there is no record of his mark although it has been tentatively identified. He too lived at Compton Street on his arrival in England but moved to St. Giles in Great St. Andrew Street, Seven Dials in 1708. He died in 1722 and was buried at St. James’s Paddington.

== Francis Harache ==
Francis Harache was born in 1710, the son of Abraham Harache, and apprenticed to Isaac Cabane, silversmith of St. Martin-in-the-Fields, in 1725. On completion of his apprenticeship, he took his brother, Thomas, as his apprentice. He was a smallworker and on entering his mark at Goldsmiths’ Hall in 1738 he gave his address as “ye Seven Dyals in great St. Andrew Street att ye blackmoors head St. Giles”. He had a prodigious output and his second mark is believed to be the FH crowned mark that appears on a great deal of smallwork. This datum would presumably have been recorded in the register for smallworkers covering the period May 1739 to July 1758, which is no longer extant.

== Thomas Harache ==
Thomas Harache was born in 1717, the son of Abraham Harache, and apprenticed to his brother Francis in 1732. On completion of his apprenticeship in 1741 he set up on his own in St Martin's Lane where he remained until 1750. He took apprentices John Jacobs in 1743, and William Danser in 1744, describing himself variously as Silversmith and Snuff box maker. His mark would have been recorded at Goldsmiths’ Hall but would have been in the missing register. On moving to Pall Mall in 1751, he would have registered a second mark and was calling himself a Goldworker at this time. Neither mark has so far been identified. He retired in 1778 at which time he was calling himself a jeweller, goldsmith and toyman. He died a fairly wealthy man in 1785.

== Family trading name ==
It is now known that the Haraches traded as a company under the title 'Pet: harache & Co. goldsmiths' and that there was a third Pierre Harache in this company who was dealing in second hand silver with Hoares' Bank C. Hoare & Co between 1697 and 1705. Nothing is known of him at present save that his address was given as Little Newport Street as was that of a third Jean Harache whose background is also unknown at present.
