= Antique Woodworking Tools =

2010 non-fiction work by David R. Russell

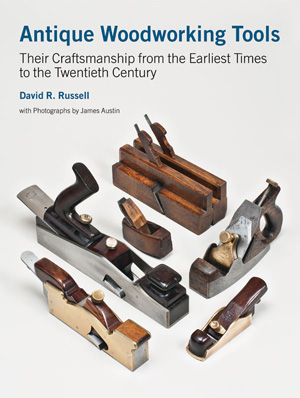
- Jacket with photograph by James Austin
- Author: David R. Russell assisted by Robert Lesage, with foreword by David Linley
- Illustrator: James Austin
- Cover artist: James Austin
- Language: English
- Release number: 1st edition
- Subject: Industrial archaeology, material culture
- Published: Cambridge
- Publisher: John Adamson in association with Bernard J. Shapero
- Publication date: October 2010
- Publication place: United Kingdom
- Media type: Print
- Pages: 528
- ISBN: 978-1-898565-05-5
- OCLC: 727125586
- Dewey Decimal: 684.08207442783
- LC Class: TT186 .R87 2010
- Website: antiquewoodworkingtools.co.uk

Antique Woodworking Tools: Their Craftsmanship from Earliest Times to the Twentieth Century is David Russell's account of the history of woodworking tools illustrated profusely with items from his extensive collection of British, continental European and North American hand tools. Planes are given special attention and British makers, among them Holtzapffel, Norris, Mathieson and Spiers, are discussed in depth.

== Summary ==
A wide array of edge and boring tools provides a broad survey of hand tool-making from prehistory to today. Writing in The Times, Huon Mallalieu encapsulated the function of the book: "Over the past 35 years [David Russell] has amassed probably the world’s largest collection of antique woodworking tools from the Stone Age to the 20th century ... The catalogue not only lists and lavishly illustrates 1556 items, but also makers’ stamps and associated material ..."

== Structure ==
After looking at a range of tools from prehistory to the Romans, the book examines in detail more recent hand tools by function: from saws to drills and braces; from rules and gauges to bevels, squares and levels. Much of the book, however, is devoted to an extensive selection of wooden and metal planes and highlights their manifold functions. These planes are arranged within chapters on continental European, British and American models, with some of the great British makers from the eighteenth to the early twentieth century discussed in depth. A short chapter focuses on spurious and altered items, drawing the reader's attention to some of the pitfalls of collecting vintage tools.

== Critical reception ==
The book has been widely acclaimed in both the general and specialized press. According to the Sheffield Telegraph, "the book not only celebrates the collection but is considered the most serious work of reference of its kind to date and destined to become a 'bible' in its field". Looking at the book from another angle, Eve Kahn in The New York Times stated that the book was "intended to glamorize unsung innovations". Carl Duguay, writing in Canadian Woodworking & Home Improvement, declared that the book was "Lavish, stunning, outstanding, magnificent ... superlatives just don't do justice to [it]."

Journals of some of the leading tool societies have been generous in their praise. "David Russell’s book is a vehicle for sharing his fabulous collection with the world," enthused John Wells in the Chronicle, the journal of the Early American Industries Association. "His unerring eye has sought out the most interesting tools available over the past 40 years, resulting in one of the world’s greatest collections of antique woodworking tools." The late Frank Ham, writing in the Australian journal Tool Chest, declared the book to be "the most impressive record of tools" he had ever seen.

Focusing on the illustrations, Mark Bridge commented in Antiques Trade Gazette on how James Austin, the book's photographer, had "managed to capture the elusive qualities of balance, texture and patina which make the finest tools a pleasure to handle, frequently lifting them into the realm of folk art".
