= Philippa Glanville =

English art historian (born 1943)

- Born: 16 August 1943 (age 83)
- Education: Girton College, Cambridge University College, London
- Occupation: Art historian
- Spouse: Gordon Glanville

Philippa Jane Glanville (nee Fox-Robinson), OBE, FSA (born 16 August 1943), formerly chief curator of the metal, silver and jewellery department of the Victoria and Albert Museum, is an English art historian who is an authority on silver and the history of dining.

== Early life ==
The second eldest of eight children of the Rev. Wilfred Henry Fox-Robinson and Jane Mary Home, she was educated at Talbot Heath School, Bournemouth, before going up to Girton College, Cambridge, where she read History, and taking a degree in Archives Administration at University College, London. While at Cambridge she took part in the archaeological excavations at Winchester conducted by Martin Biddle, later Professor of Medieval Archaeology at Oxford.

== Career ==
After graduating, she joined the London Museum (later the Museum of London) as curator in the Tudor and Stuart department, from 1966 to 1972, and as head of department from 1972 to 1980. Her interest in the history of food was stimulated in 1968 by curating a London Museum exhibition on Tudor food celebrating 400 years of ownership of Loseley Park, Surrey by the More-Molyneux family. In 1980 she moved to the Victoria and Albert Museum as an assistant in the metalwork department, of which she was chief curator between 1996 and 1999. She was encouraged by the director, Sir Roy Strong, to study the social history of silver and the hierarchy of status. This led her increasingly to examine the uses of silver at the table. Among her accomplishments at the V&A, she redisplayed the museum's silver collection to reveal how historic meals were served. On leaving she was appointed Academic Director at Waddesdon Manor, the former Rothschild seat in Buckinghamshire, where she remained until 2003. There, she created exhibitions that placed objects in situ, sometimes with elaborate recreations of the foods served in them by the historian Ivan Day. These included a display in the dining-room intended to show how Baron Rothschild might have dined in the 19th century, when he resided there; as well as an exhibition showing the use of French 18th-century porcelain, one of the strengths of the collection.

Among the exhibitions she has curated or worked on are A King's Feast The Goldsmith's Art and Royal Banqueting in the 18th Century, (the Danish Queen's French service) at Kensington Palace in 1991, Versailles et les Tables Royales en Europe, 1993, Feeding Desire; design and the tools of the table 1500-2005, for the Cooper Hewitt, Smithsonian Design Museum, New York in 2005 and Drink: A History 1695-1920, for the National Archives in 2007.

She served on the Council for the Care of Churches (now the Church Buildings Council), 1997-2001, and since 1998 has served on the Westminster Abbey Fabric Committee. She also serves as a vice-president of the National Association of Decorative and Fine Arts Societies (NADFAS). She is an assistant fellow of Warwick University, a liveryman of the Goldsmiths' Company and a founder liveryman of the Company of Arts Scholars. She was elected Fellow of the Society of Antiquaries in 1968 and appointed an Officer of the Order of the British Empire (OBE) in 2015.

== Personal life ==
She married Gordon Glanville in 1968, they were married until Gordon died in 2019. They had two sons James and Matthew and Philippa lives in Richmond, Surrey.

Her younger son, Matthew Glanville, is married to Annunziata Rees-Mogg, sister of the former House of Commons Leader Jacob Rees-Mogg

Her youngest sister, Sarah, has Down Syndrome. A rare disorder that affects a person's chromosomes.

== Books ==
This bibliography lists books of which Philippa Glanville is the author or editor, or to which she has been a contributor.

- London in Maps (Yale University Press, 1982) (ISBN 0300029047). Paperback edition, 1985 (ISBN 0300034741)
- Silver in Tudor and Early Stuart England (V&A Publications, 1986) (ISBN 1851770305)
- Silver in England (Unwin Hyman, 1987, Routledge edition, 2005) (ISBN 0415382157)
- The Glory of the Goldsmith: Magnificent Gold and Silver from the Al Tajir Collection Charles Truman (preface by Philippa Glanville) (Christie, Manson & Woods, 1989) (ISBN 9780903432368 OCLC 775322655)
- Women Silversmiths (with Jennifer Faulds Goldsborough) (National Museum of Women in the Arts, 1990) (ISBN 094097911X)
- Versailles et les tables royales en Europe: XVIIème-XIXème siècles (contrib. Philippa Glanville) (Réunion des Musées Nationaux, 1993) (ISBN 2711827747)
- Quand Versailles était meublé d'argent ed. Catherine Arminjon (contrib. Philippa Glanville) (Réunion des Musées Nationaux, 1997) (ISBN 9782711853571)
- The Albert Collection: Five Hundred Years of British and European Silver Robin Butler (ed. Philippa Glanville) (Broadway Publishing, 1999) (ISBN 978-1-85149-478-1)
- Elegant Eating (editor and contributor) (V&A Publications, 2002) (ISBN 1851773371)
- East Anglian Silver ed. Christopher Hartop (contrib. Philippa Glanville) (John Adamson, 2004) (ISBN 978-0-9524322-2-7)
- Royal Goldsmiths: The Art of Rundell & Bridge 1797-1843 ed. Christopher Hartop (contrib. Philippa Glanville) (John Adamson, 2005) (ISBN 978-0-9524322-3-4 OCLC 61424651)
- Feeding Desire: Design and the Tools of the Table, 1500-2005 (contrib. Philippa Glanville) (Assouline, 2006) (ISBN 2843238455; paperback ISBN 2843238471)
- Britannia and Muscovy: English Silver at the Court of the Tsars ed. Natalya Abramova and Olga Dmitrieva (contrib. Philippa Glanville) (Yale University Press, 2007) (ISBN 978-0-300-11678-6)
- The Art of Drinking (ed. Philippa Glanville and Sophie Lee) (V&A Publications, 2007) (ISBN 1851775102)
- A Noble Feast: English Silver from the Jerome and Rita Gans Collection at the Virginia Museum of Fine Arts Christopher Hartop (contrib. Philippa Glanville) (Virginia Museum of Fine Arts in association with John Adamson, 2007) (ISBN 978-0-917046-83-4)
- Dinner with a Duke: Decoding Food and Drink at Welbeck Abbey 1695-1914 (Harley Foundation, 2010) (ASIN B009WPGQF4)
- Gold: Power and Allure ed. Helen Clifford (contrib. Philippa Glanville) (Paul Holberton, 2012) (ISBN 978-0-907814-86-3)
- The Oxford Companion to Sugar and Sweets (contrib. Philippa Glanville) (OUP, 2015) (ISBN 0199313393)

== Other publications ==
Numerous articles in: Antiquaries' Journal; Apollo; Burlington Magazine; Country Life; NADFAS Magazine; Silver Studies (formerly the Silver Society Journal); World of Interiors, &c.
