= T. Norris & Son =

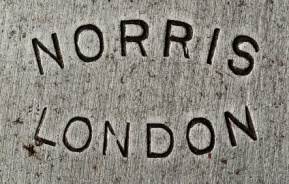
- Maker's mark on the iron from a Norris smoothing plane
- Industry: Manufacturing
- Founded: 1860
- Headquarters: Lambeth, then New Malden, Surrey
- Key people: Thomas Norris (1836–?), born Lambeth, "master tool maker" at 57 York St; Thomas James Norris (1861–1936), born Southwark; Helen Sellars Norris (1866?–1952), wife of Thomas James Norris
- Products: Hand tools

The firm of T. Norris & Son was one of the most prestigious makers of hand tools in England in the late nineteenth and early twentieth centuries and famed for the quality and gracefulness of its output, notably of its metal planes. Both wooden and metal planes made in Norris's workshop survive as do other edge tools. Some Norris planes, especially bespoke models, are highly prized by woodworkers and collectors.

== Lambeth ==
Thomas Norris is recorded as a joiners' tool-maker in Lambeth, Surrey by 1861, living at 57 York Street. A works address at 23 York Road, Lambeth, is also given on some tools and on the cover of the c. 1908 price list. Thomas James Norris, the eldest child of Thomas and Jane Norris is recorded as a tool maker in the 1881 census and again in the 1891 census; by the 1911 census, however, he is recorded as living at 3 Sycamore Grove, New Malden, Surrey, with a "personal occupation" of "iron plane making & repairs for joiners and cabinetmakers also general tool dealers".

== New Malden, Surrey ==
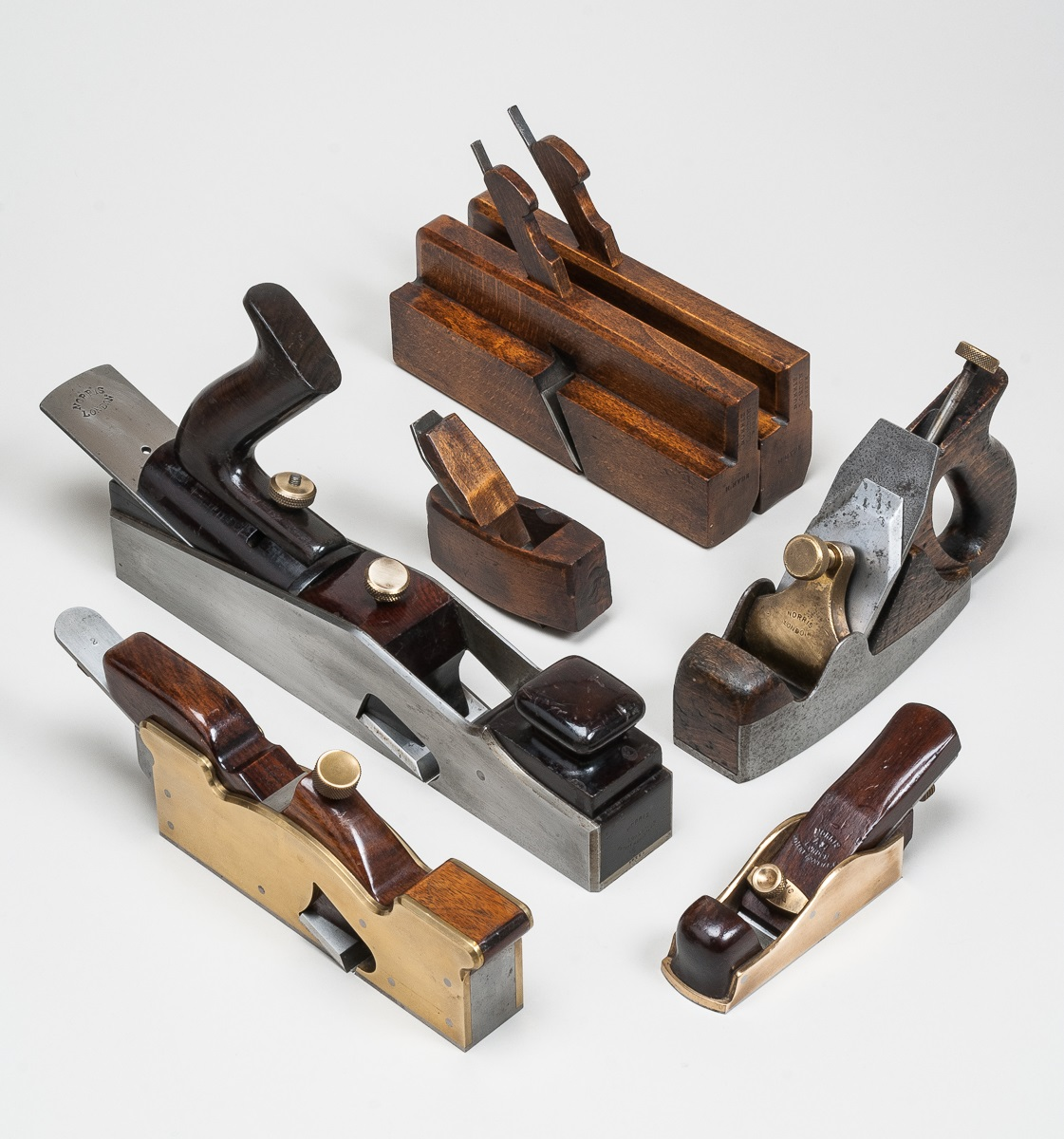
Planes by T. Norris & Son and Henley Optical Company Photograph by James Austin

It is not known when Thomas J. Norris set up his workshop in the grounds of his house in New Malden. David Russell suggests that this had happened by 1919.

Thomas James Norris died 3 July 1936 leaving an estate of £3640 13s 9d.

W.J. Yarranton worked as an apprentice at the Norris workshop from October 1939 when he joined as a 14-year-old boy until April 1943 when he volunteered for the RAF. When he left he recalls that he was given a reference signed by the director, a Mrs H. Norris.

According to the London Gazette, Helen Sellars Norris, the widow of Thomas was chairman of the company at the time of an Extraordinary General Meeting of T. Norris & Son Limited held on 31 March 1941 at which the resolution was duly passed that "the Company be wound up voluntarily". The Members' Voluntary Winding-up was to be reported at a General Meeting of the Members of the Company on 23 September 1941. The timing of change of ownership has yet to be clarified. It would seem, however, that she had taken charge of the business on her husband's death and that although perhaps no longer the owner of the firm in 1943 when Yarranton left, she was working on as a director after the firm had become Norris Planes Ltd.

Helen Sellars Norris died 8 March 1952 at Worthing.

=== Norris patent adjustment device ===
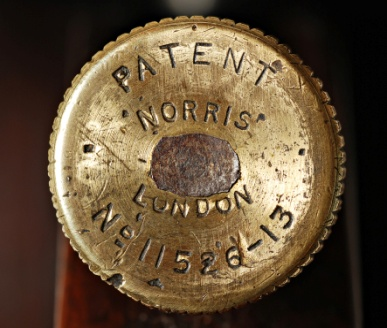
The 1913 patent number on the adjustment knob of an A1 jointing plane

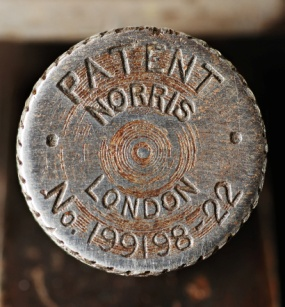
The 1922 patent number on the adjustment knob of an economy version of a closed-handle smoothing plane

The quest for full vertical and lateral control of the plane iron had been raging for many years. Leonard Bailey in Connecticut devised a system in 1867 that was to be adopted by Stanley. Charles Nurse in London invented a plane-iron regulator (patented 1889), a device that the firm of Norris & Son experimented with on its planes before Thomas James Norris created and patented an adjustment mechanism of his own.

- First patent

Under patent 11,526 of 13 July 1913 Norris sought protection for his "Adjustment for Plane Irons". The 1914 Norris price list gives an outline explanation, whereas the HMSO report published in 1921 gives a full description of the mechanism.

During the First World War Norris continued making tools. Economy designs were supplied to the government, some with Norris's patent adjustment device.

On some later low-angle planes with pin-and-hole iron adjustment, the 1913 patent number was used without the 13 suffix.

- Second patent

Under no. 199,198 of 22 June 1923 Thomas J. Norris patented modifications to his patent adjustment device.

=== Maker's marks ===
In the early days the mark varied considerably and often gave one of the Lambeth addresses. Later the simple "Norris London" (initially set straight or later in an ellipse) was used.

== Later years ==
=== Norris Planes Ltd and Norris Planes & Tools Ltd ===
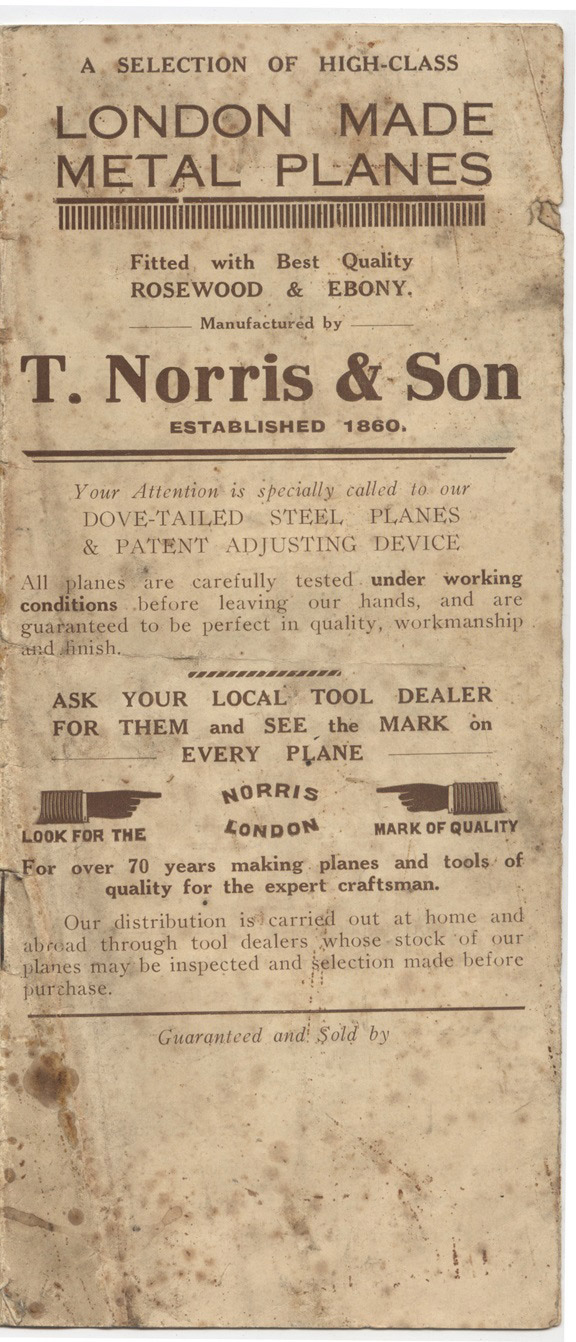
T. Norris & Son: A Selection of High-Class London Made Metal Planes Front cover of the 1930s price list Photograph by James Austin

The premises at 3 Sycamore Grove, New Malden, were leased in 1941 for the duration of the War plus three months to Aeronautical and General Instruments Ltd, with registered office Purley Way, Croydon, "for the manufacture of scientific instruments and the purposes of general engineering".

Many planes made during this period used parallel steel channel rather than being dovetailed and peened.

A certain Ernest George Long, Foreman, Aeronautical & General Instruments Ltd. (Morden, Surrey) was awarded the British Empire Medal in the 1951 New Year Honours. Although there is no known direct correlation with Norris planes, the award hints at a continuing excellence in engineering.

== Legacy ==
Several makers have found inspiration in the workmanship and design of Norris planes:

- Henley Optical Company, Oxford, made a range of exquisitely manufactured planes in the 1970s and 1980s.
- Bill Carter has since 1987 been making planes many in the Norris tradition.
- Holtey Planes; first inspiration came from a Norris plane in the 1990s.

== Exhibitions ==
No evidence has yet been found of participation by T. Norris & Son in world's fairs.

== Bibliography ==
- Moskowitz, Joel, and Sally Bernstein (intro.), with photographs by Joel Moskowitz. Norris Metal Planes (2002), Lakeville, MN: Astragal Press (reprints the Norris 1914 catalogue with material from the c. 1928 Norris catalogue and from the 1938 dealer's catalogue issued by Buck & Ryan) ISBN 978-1931626088 OCLC 313450745
- Norris, T. & Son (c. 1908), Illustrated Price List Metal Planes, Lambeth, London
- Norris, T. & Son (1914), A Selection of High-Class London Made Metal Planes, London
- Norris, T. & Son (c. 1928), Norris London Metal Planes, London
- Norris, T. & Son (1930s), A Selection of High-Class London Made Metal Planes, London
- Russell, David R., "T. Norris & Son" and "The Norris Legacy" in David R. Russell, James Austin (photography), David Linley (foreword), Antique Woodworking Tools: Their Craftsmanship from the Earliest Times to the Twentieth Century, Cambridge: John Adamson (2010) ISBN 978-1-898565-05-5 OCLC 727125586, pp. 379–430
- Russell, David R., with John Adamson, "The great plane-makers: The history behind T. Norris & Son", Furniture & Cabinetmaking, issue 221, August 2014, ISSN 1365-4292, pp. 58–62 (updated summary taken from David Russell's book with a column on the Norris adjuster written by Karl Holtey)
