= David R. Russell =

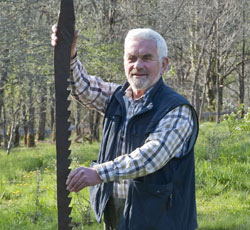
- David Russell with a long blade from a water-driven sawmill Detail from a photograph by James Austin
- Born: 23 September 1935; Burneside, Westmorland, UK
- Died: 21 March 2018 (aged 82); Settle, North Yorkshire
- Occupation: Retired builder
- Website: www.antiquewoodworkingtools.co.uk

David R. Russell (23 September 1935 – 21 March 2018) was a builder who for many years collected antique woodworking tools.

== Career and collecting ==
David Richard Russell was born at Burneside near Kendal in Westmorland (now part of Cumbria), England, the younger son of Albert, a worker in a Cumbrian gunpowder-keg factory, and Alice Russell (née Mason). He left school early to work alongside his brother as an apprentice to a cabinet-maker and joiner in Kendal. One of his first jobs as a young apprentice was working on site with his brother at Sizergh Castle, near Kendal.

"His first love was the foreman's Norris jointing-plane, which he was not allowed to touch however much his fingers tingled," wrote Huon Mallalieu in The Times. "Seven years later his passion was assuaged, but not extinguished, when he bought his first Norris for £5 in a Sunday antiques market." This was the beginning of what was to become one of the foremost collections of woodworking tools in the Western world.

Although David Russell's career was to follow a different path, one of his lifelong passions was wood-carving. After completing his National Service in Malaya he went into the building trade, working first of all in Bournemouth and then for Wimpey in London. Back in Cumbria he formed a partnership with his brother and by the end of his career their building firm, by then known as Russell Armer Ltd, employed some 250 men. His firm's building project in collaboration with the local architect Mike Walford at Webster's Yard, Kendal, was reviewed in depth in the Architects' Journal.

Throughout his working life and well into his retirement Russell could be seen raising his paddle at tool auctions on both sides of the Atlantic as he bid for some of the finest tools on offer.

When tool historians and tool book writers began to pay him visits to see his collection and publish items from it, he came to realise that what he had amassed was worthy of a book in its own right. He struggled to pull together a team to bring the book to fruition, but after much toil spanning several years, and with the great support and insightful input of Abigail Saxon and others the book was published to critical acclaim in October 2010. The dust-jacket text summarises the book's aim as one of "providing a broad survey of hand tool-making from prehistory to today." As David Linley wrote in the foreword: "[David Russell] is to be congratulated on amassing with unerring eye such a fascinating array of tools."

Eve M. Kahn, writing in The New York Times averred that "The Russell collection volume [. . .] was intended to glamorize unsung innovations". Mark Bridge in his review in Antiques Trade Gazette was more specific about the numerous photographs by the Courtauld Institute-trained photographer James Austin : "This is a truly huge work . . . and is quite unrivalled in the size and quality of its illustrations. [James Austin] has managed to capture the elusive qualities of balance, texture and patina which make the finest tools a pleasure to handle, frequently lifting them into the realm of folk art".

== Bibliography ==
- Russell, David R. with Robert Lesage and photographs by James Austin, cataloguing assisted by Peter Hackett, foreword by David Linley. Antique Woodworking Tools: Their Craftsmanship from the Earliest Times to the Twentieth Century. Cambridge: John Adamson (2010) ISBN 978-1-898565-05-5 OCLC 727125586

=== Other books featuring tools from the David Russell collection ===
- Eaton, Reg. The Ultimate Brace: A Unique Product of Victorian Sheffield. King's Lynn: Erica Jane Publishing (1989) ISBN 978-0-9514695-0-7
- Hambly, Maya. Drawing Instruments: 1580–1980. London: Sotheby's Publications (1988) ISBN 978-085667-341-2
- Lampert, Nigel. Through Much Tribulation: Stewart Spiers and the Planemakers of Ayr. Pascoe Vale, Victoria, Australia: Oliver Publications (1999) ISBN 978-0-646-36426-1
- Nagyszalanczy, Sandor. The Art of Fine Tools. Newtown, CT: Taunton Press Inc.: Paperback (2000) ISBN 978-1-56158-361-4
- Proudfoot, Christopher, and Philip Walker. Woodworking Tools. Oxford: Phaidon, Christie's Collectors Guides (1984) ISBN 978-0-7148-8005-1
- Rees, Jane and Mark. The Rule Book: Measuring for the Trades. Lakeville, MN: Astragal Press (2010) ISBN 978-1-931626-26-2
