= James Austin (photographer) =

Australian photographer (born 1940)

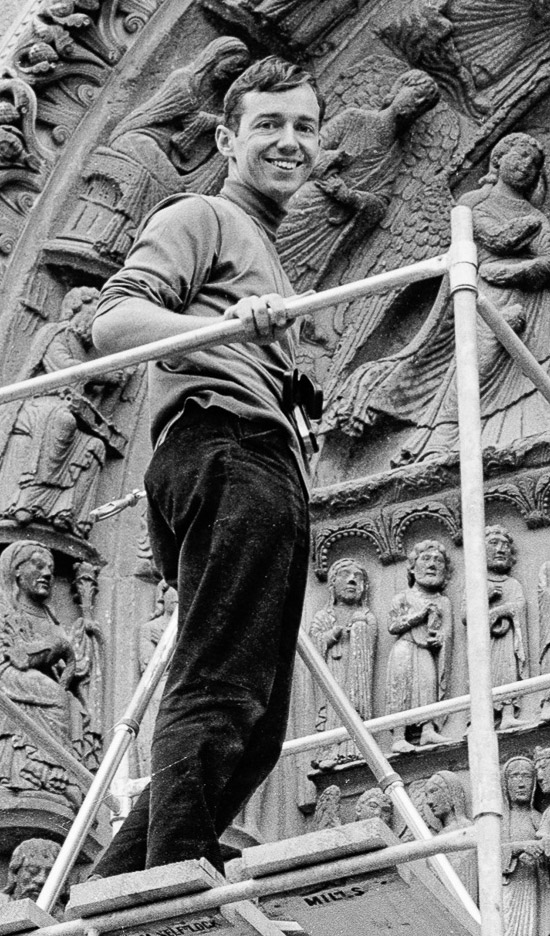
- Photograph by Pauline Austin
- Born: 4 June 1940 (age 86); Melbourne, Australia
- Education: Lycée Lakanal, Paris; Manchester Grammar School; Jesus College, Cambridge; Courtauld Institute,
- Occupations: Fine-art and architectural photographer
- Spouse: Pauline Jeannette (née Aten)

James Austin (born 4 June 1940) is an Australian fine-art and architectural photographer.

== Biography ==
James Lucien Ashurst Austin was born in Melbourne, Australia, the eldest son of Lloyd James Austin (1915–1994) and of Jeanne-Françoise (née Guérin). He is the older brother of the late Colin Austin (1941–2010), the scholar of ancient Greek. After studying architecture and fine art at Jesus College, Cambridge, he continued his education at the Courtauld Institute, London.

He then travelled widely in France and Italy as a freelance photographer building up a library of photographs now in use worldwide in art history archives and numerous publications. Among his early clients were the Bollingen Foundation in New York and Sir Nikolaus Pevsner, for whom he provided photographs for twenty volumes of the Buildings of England series. He was Ben Nicholson's personal photographer for the last ten years of the painter's life.

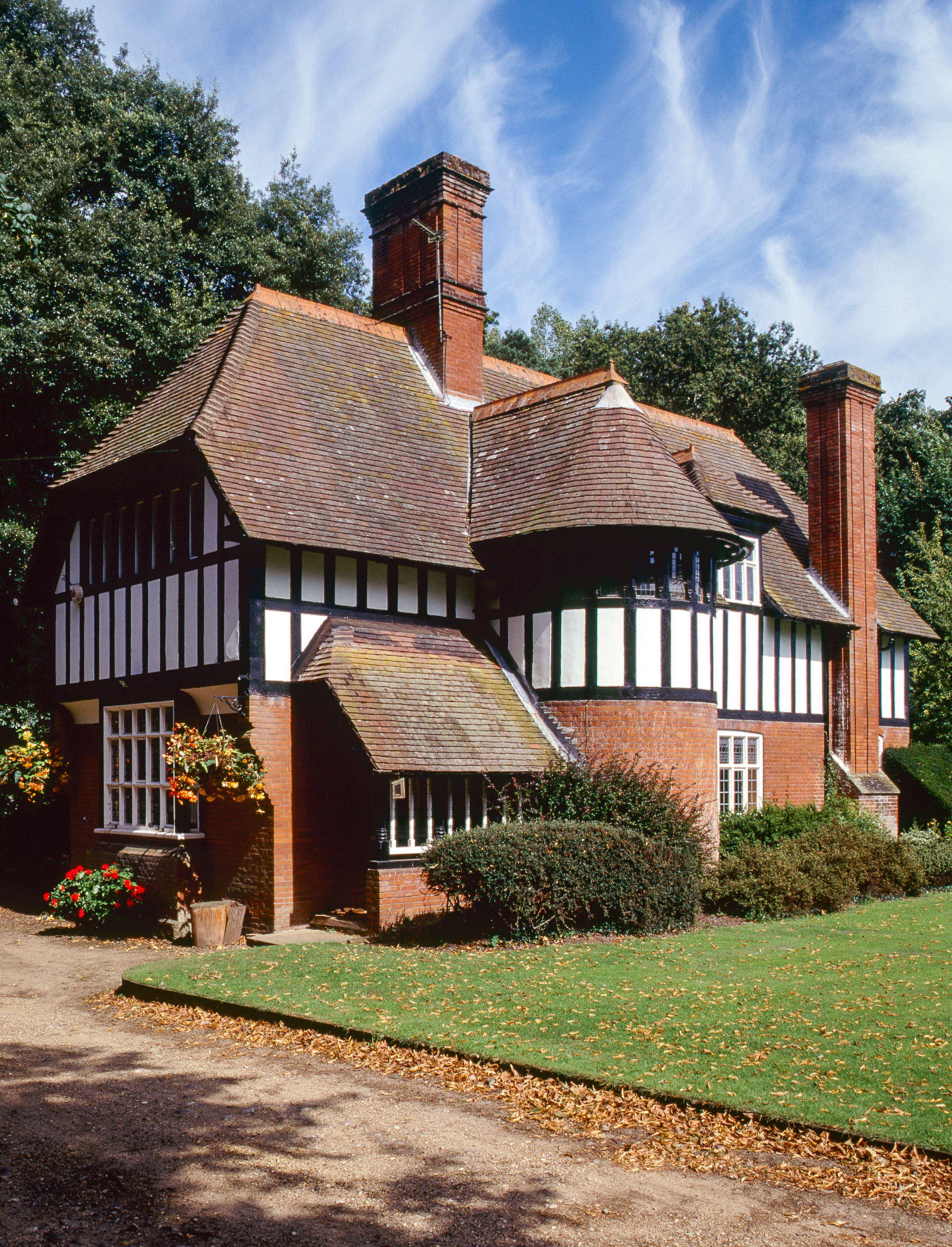
Thomas Jeckyll. The Lodge. Framingham Manor, Framingham Pigot, Norfolk. 1872 Photograph by James Austin

He went back to work at the Courtauld Institute for twelve years, travelling extensively around Europe to photograph historic architecture and sculpture for the Conway Library at the Courtauld. On his retirement he transferred his collection of negatives of architectural and sculptural subjects to the Conway Library whose archive of photographs is in the process of being digitised as part of the Courtauld Connects project.

He returned to freelance work in 1985, when he was commissioned to take all the photographs for the catalogue of the Robert and Lisa Sainsbury Collection. His career broadened to encompass the photography of fine art. He worked for the National Trust, English Heritage, the Crafts Council, the Tate Gallery, Kettle's Yard in Cambridge and numerous other institutions, architects, artists, craftsmen and collectors. He continued working for the Sainsbury collection – on several exhibition catalogues and photographing new acquisitions – right up to his retirement in April 2004, keeping a studio and darkroom at Wysing Arts Centre from 1997 until then.

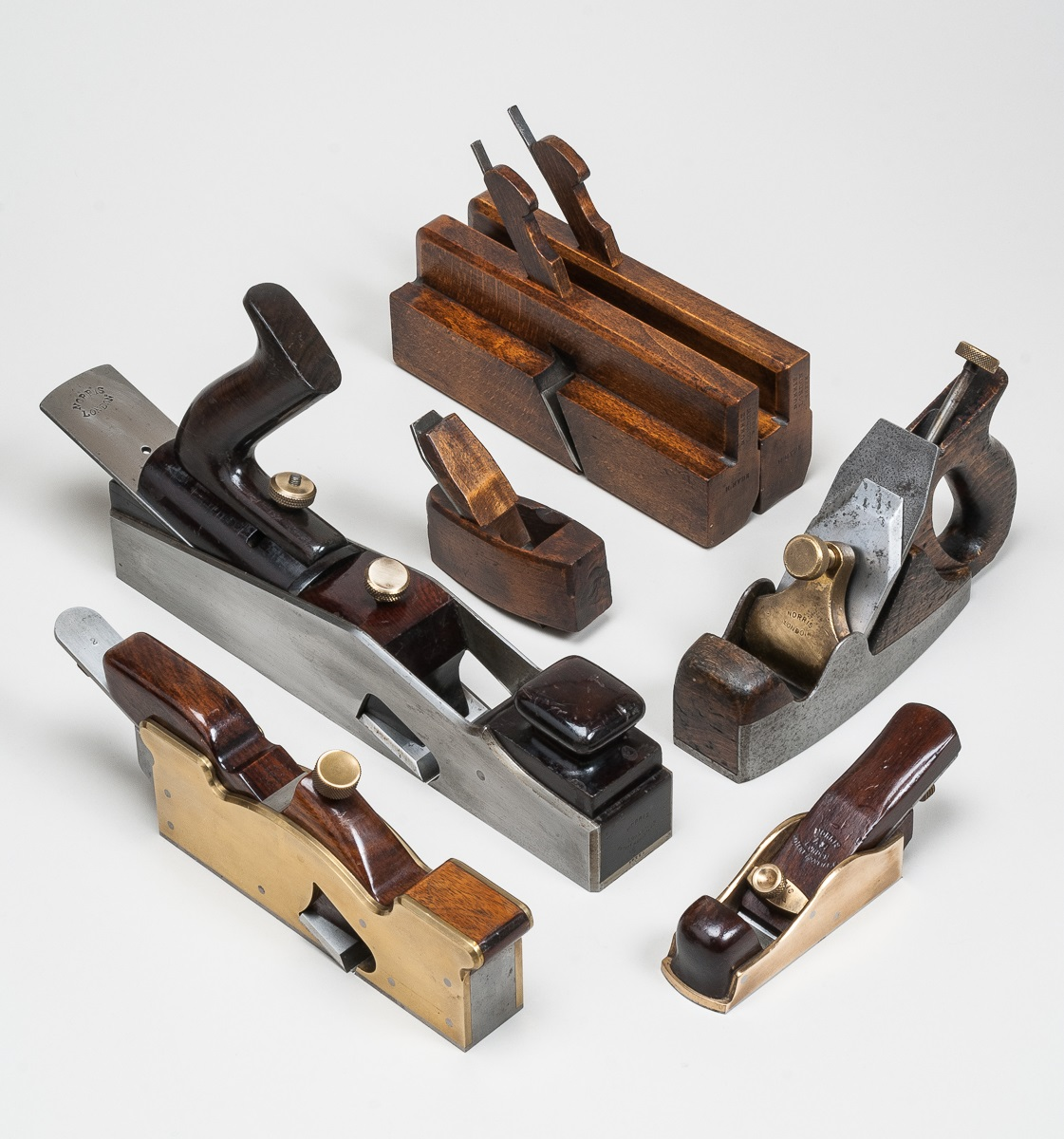
Planes by T. Norris & Son and Henley Optical Company Photograph by James Austin

The book Antique Woodworking Tools, in which James Austin published more than 1,500 illustrations, clearly demonstrates his skill in photographing small objects in the round. Mark Bridge pinpointed this in his review of the book in Antiques Trade Gazette when he wrote: "[James Austin] has managed to capture the elusive qualities of balance, texture and patina which make the finest tools a pleasure to handle, frequently lifting them into the realm of folk art".

Photographs by Austin are held by many institutions. As well as those listed in the section headed 'External links' below and the Conway Library, the Getty Research Institute purchased 10,000 of his images as a source of reliable research material and Yale University holds the James Austin Photograph Collection of French and Italian Medieval Architecture.

== Exhibition ==
Wingfield Barns Arts Centre, Eye, Suffolk: solo exhibition of specially commissioned photographs, summer 2002

== Honours ==
James Austin was a Fellow of the British Institute of Professional Photography (BIPP) from 1977 to 1991.

== Bibliography ==
Books for which James Austin did all, most or many of the photographs:

- Prior, Katherine, with many photographs by James Austin (2012). In Good Hands: 250 Years of Craftsmanship at Swaine Adeney Brigg. Cambridge: John Adamson. ISBN 978-1-898565-09-3
- Russell, David R. with Robert Lesage and photographs by James Austin, cataloguing assisted by Peter Hackett (2010). Antique Woodworking Tools: Their Craftsmanship from the Earliest Times to the Twentieth Century Cambridge: John Adamson ISBN 978-1-898565-05-5
- Soros, Susan Weber, and Catherine Arbuthnott (2003). Thomas Jeckyll: Architect and Designer, 1827–1881. New Haven, CT and London: Yale University Press ISBN 978-0-300-09922-5 (Winner of the 2004 Henry Russell Hitchcock Award sponsored by the Victorian Society in America and winner of the 2005 Philip Johnson Award given by the Society of Architectural Historians)
- Frankel, Cyril (2000). Modern Pots: Hans Coper, Lucie Rie and Their Contemporaries: The Lisa Sainsbury Collection. London and New York: Thames and Hudson ISBN 978-0-500-97595-4
- Gillow, John, and Bryan Sentence (1999). World Textiles. London: Thames and Hudson ISBN 978-0-500-28247-2 Boston, MA: Bullfinch ISBN 978-0-8212-2621-6
- Grimstone, A.V. (1997). Pembroke College, Cambridge: A Celebration. Cambridge: Pembroke College No ISBN
- Hooper, Steven (ed.), with photography by James Austin (1997). Robert and Lisa Sainsbury Collection (3 vols.). New Haven and London: Yale University Press ISBN 978-0-300-03952-8
- Ray, Nicholas (1994). Cambridge Architecture: A Concise Guide. Cambridge: Cambridge University Press Paperback ISBN 978-0-521-45855-9
- Mâle, Émile (1978, 1983, 1986). Studies in Religious Iconography: Religious Art in France (3 vols.) Princeton, NJ: Princeton University Press ISBN 978-0-691-09913-2
