= List of masters of Downing College, Cambridge =

This is a list of masters of Downing College, Cambridge. The head of Downing College, Cambridge is termed the "Master". Downing was founded as a result of the will of Sir George Downing, 3rd Baronet and it received its Royal Charter in 1800 from George III.

The current Master is Graham Virgo.

== List of Masters ==
Name	Portrait	Term of office	
Francis Annesley		22 September 1800	17 April 1812†
William Frere		8 May 1812	25 May 1836†
Thomas Worsley		23 June 1836	16 February 1885†
William Lloyd Birkbeck		1 March 1885	25 May 1888†
Alexander Hill		16 June 1888	1907
Frederick Howard Marsh		24 October 1907	24 June 1915†
Sir Albert Seward		2 August 1915	1936
Admiral Sir Herbert Richmond		1 November 1936	15 December 1946†
Sir Lionel Whitby		22 May 1947	24 November 1956†
William Keith Chambers Guthrie		28 April 1957	1972
Sir Morien Morgan		1972	4 April 1978†
Sir John Butterfield		1978	1987
Peter Mathias		1987	1995
Sir David King		1995	2000
Stephen Fleet		2001	2003
Barry Everitt		2003	2013
Geoffrey Grimmett		2013	2018
Alan Bookbinder		2018	2023
Graham Virgo		2023	
