= List of honorary fellows of Downing College, Cambridge =

This is a list of Honorary Fellows of Downing College, Cambridge.

- Aitzaz Ahsan
- Keith Ajegbo
- David Anderson, Baron Anderson of Ipswich
- Michael Apted
- Dame Janet Baker
- Martin Baker
- Farmida Bi
- Sir Quentin Blake
- Sir Colin Birss
- Sir Colin Blakemore
- Alan Bookbinder
- Sir Alan Bowness
- Richard Bowring
- Godfrey Bradman
- Victoria Brignell
- Giles Brindley
- Ed Bullmore
- Sir Arnold Burgen
- John Cardy
- Alan Carrington
- Stephen Chambers
- Nigel Clifford
- Lawrence Collins, Baron Collins of Mapesbury
- Dharshini David
- Barry Everitt
- Sir Francis Graham-Smith
- Emily Greenwood
- Richard Gregory
- Geoffrey Grimmett
- Ravindra Gupta
- Alan Howard
- David Ingram
- Howard Jacobson
- P. D. James, Baroness James of Holland Park
- Martin Kemp
- Sir David King
- Mike Lean
- Sir Kim Lewison
- David Lloyd Jones, Lord Lloyd Jones
- Peter Mathias
- Martin Maiden
- Sir Richard McCombe
- Wilfrid Mellers
- Keith Murray, Baron Murray of Newhaven
- Sir Trevor Nunn
- Rachel O'Reilly
- Stuart Peach, Baron Peach
- Sir John Pendry
- Sir Andrew Popplewell
- David Rees
- Ritchie Robertson
- Richard Snowden
- Sir Brian Vickers
- Ai Weiwei
- Dame Caroline Wilson
- N. T. Wright

== See also ==
- Category:Alumni of Downing College, Cambridge
- Category:Fellows of Downing College, Cambridge
