= Swiss Raid Commando =

Military competition

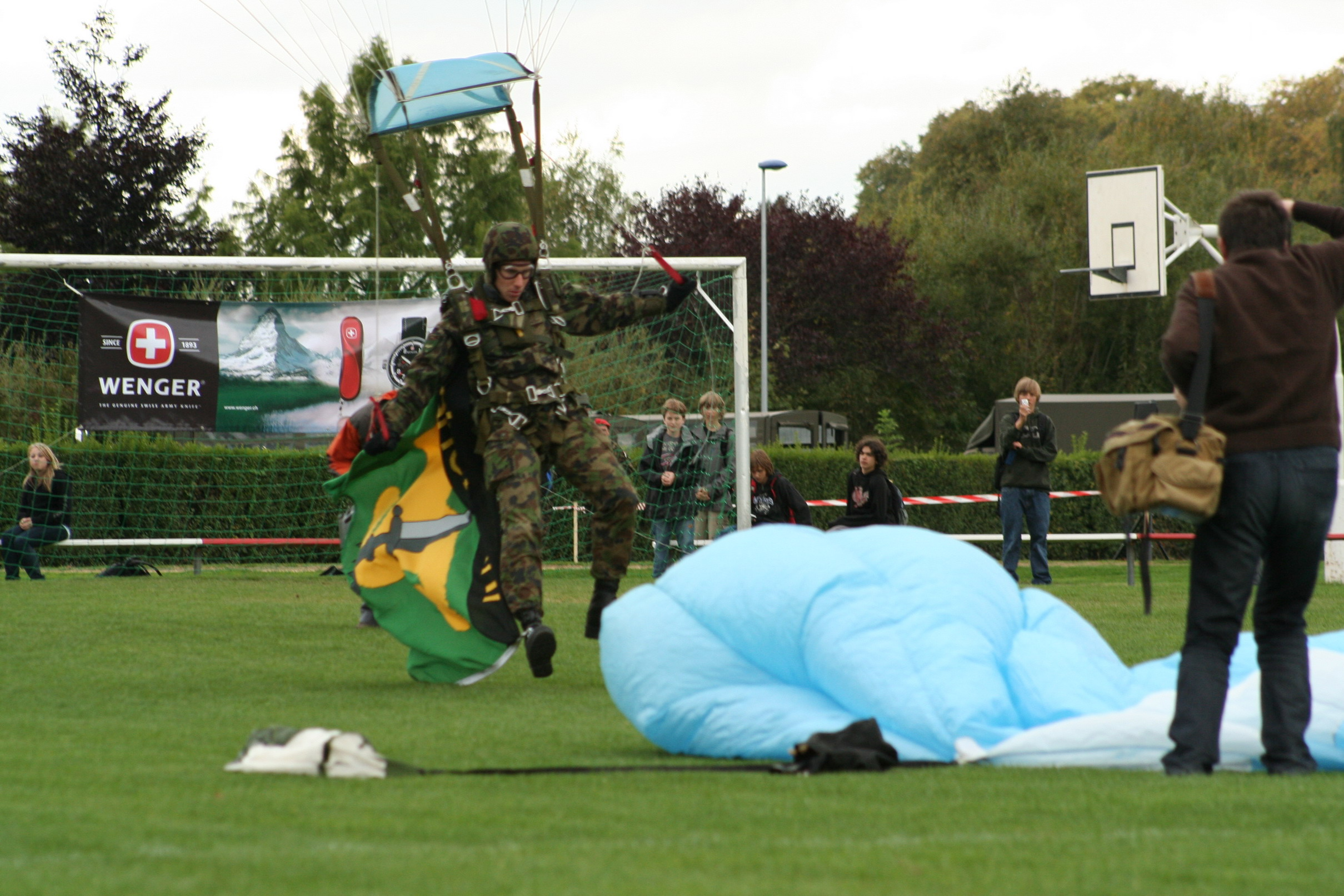
SRC Paratrooper Jump

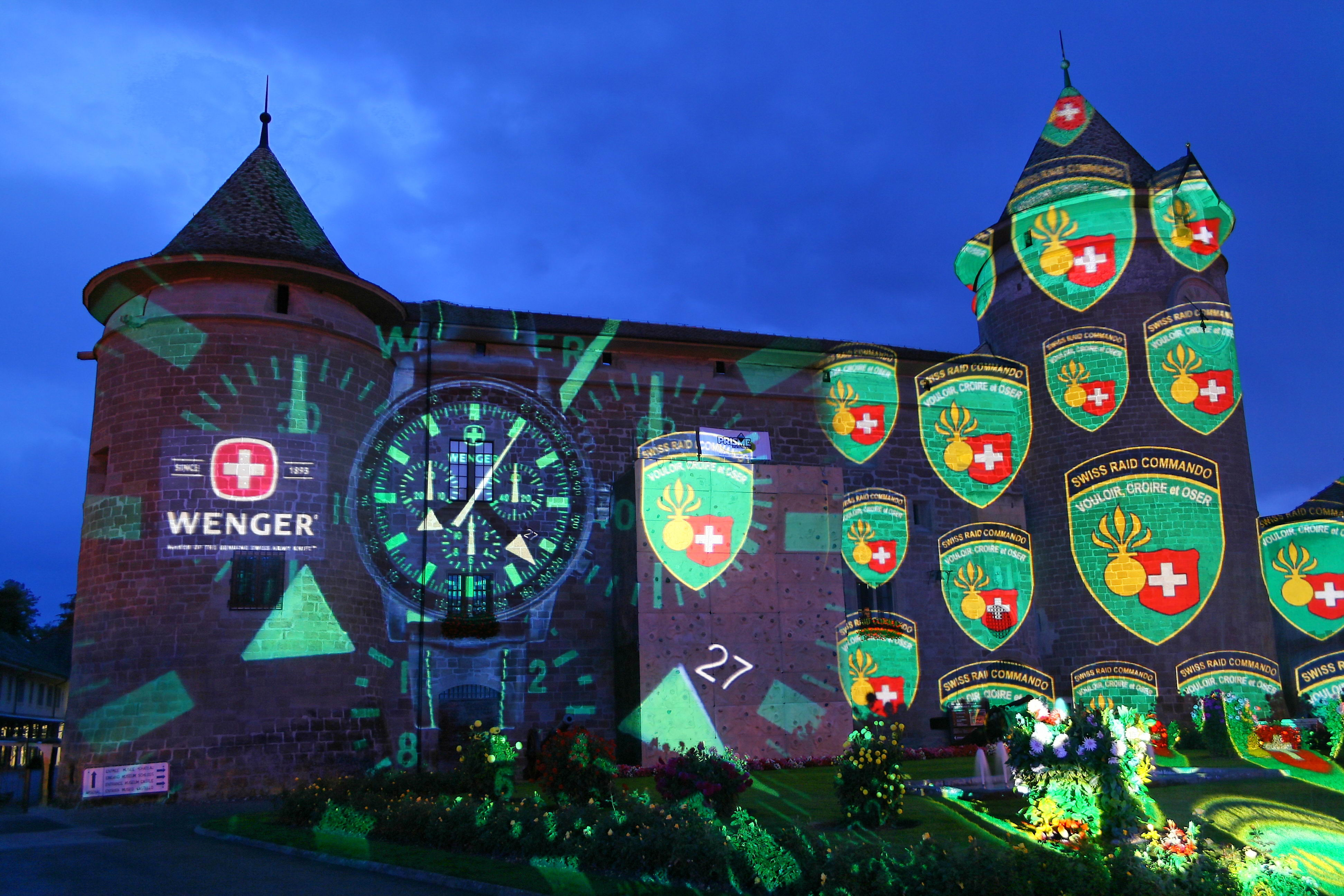
Morges Castle in 2007 during SRC by Gerry Hofstetter Light Artist

The Swiss Raid Commando (SRC) was a military competition. It was discontinued after the 18th edition in 2009 due to economic constraints. The competition's motto was "Vouloir, Croire et Oser" ("Want, Believe and Dare").

The raiders competed in teams of 4, in which at least one patrol member was required to be either an officer or an NCO. Strong infantry training, excellent physical condition as well as analytical and above-average judgment skills were vital. During each edition, an average of 650 soldiers competed, most of whom came from elite troops from 15 different countries.

== History ==
The first SRC was held in 1986, implemented by the Neuchatel officers’ society, and the last took place in 2009. From 1997 through 2003, the event was organised by Field Division 2, and after that by the Swiss Infantry Training Unit. The SRC has the full support of the Department of Defence, Population Protection and Sports (DDPS).
