= Heilbronn Institute for Mathematical Research =

Research centre at the University of Bristol

Coordinates: 51°27′26″N 2°36′14.7″W

- Type: Research centre
- Established: 2005
- Location: Bristol, London and Manchester, England
- Website: heilbronn.ac.uk

The Heilbronn Institute for Mathematical Research is a national research institute for mathematics based at the University of Bristol. It is named after the distinguished number theorist Hans Heilbronn who worked at Bristol University from 1934–1935 and 1946–1964. The Institute was founded in 2005 and is run as a partnership between the UK Government Communications Headquarters and the UK academic mathematics community. It has facilities in Bristol, London and Manchester. As of September 2023, the Chair of the Institute is Catherine Hobbs, having succeeded Geoffrey Grimmett.

The Institute has headquarters in the Fry Building of Bristol University, to which it moved in September 2019 together with the School of Mathematics of the University.
