= George Weekes =

British academic

George Arthur Weekes (b Clifton, Bristol 5 September 1869; d Cambridge 23 June 1953) was a 20th-century British academic.

Weekes was educated at Bristol Grammar School and Sidney Sussex College, Cambridge. He became a Fellow of Sidney Sussex in 1893; Chaplain in 1894; Praelector in 1895; Tutor in 1905; Senior proctor in 1906 and Master in 1918. He was Vice-Chancellor of the University of Cambridge from 1926 to 1928. He was appointed a Canon of Ely in 1935, and retired in 1945.

Academic offices
Preceded by Charles Smith	Master of Sidney Sussex College, Cambridge; 1918–1945	Succeeded by Thomas Knox-Shaw
Preceded by Albert Seward	Vice-Chancellor of the University of Cambridge; 1926–1928	Succeeded by Thomas Cecil Fitzpatrick
