= George Birkbeck =

British physician, academic, philanthropist, and professor

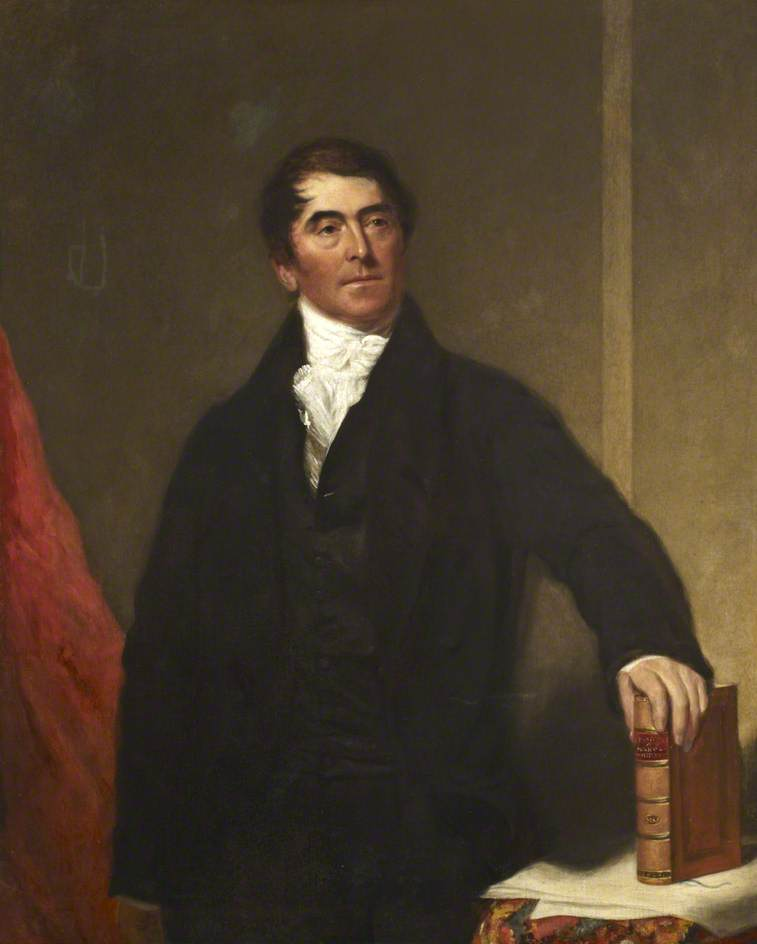
George Birkbeck by Samuel Lane. Oil, 1830.

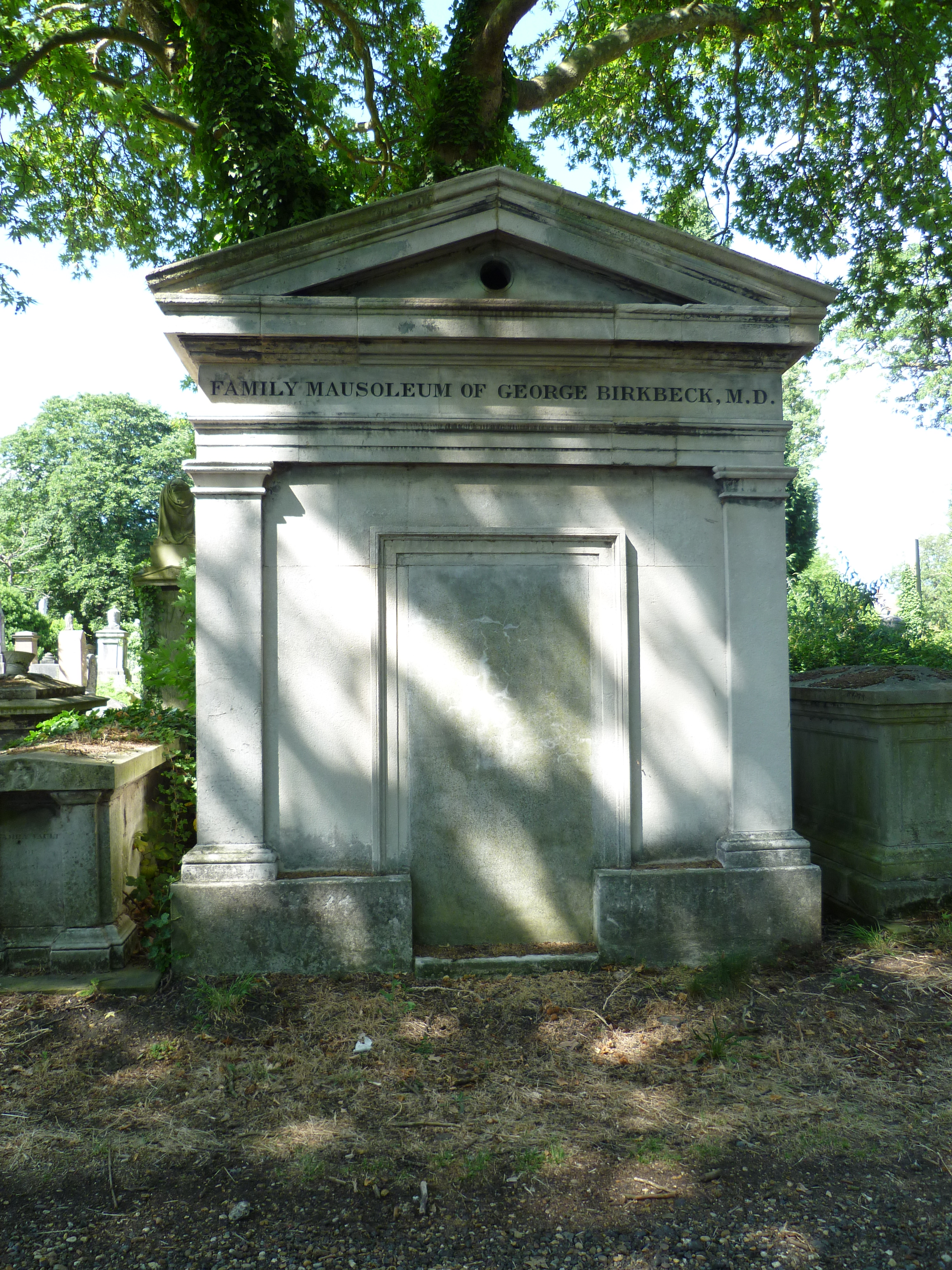
The George Birkbeck family mausoleum at Kensal Green Cemetery, London

George Birkbeck (/ˈbɜːrkˌbɛk/; 10 January 1776 – 1 December 1841) was an English physician, academic, philanthropist, pioneer in adult education and a professor of natural philosophy at the Andersonian Institute. He is the founder of Birkbeck, University of London and was head of the Chemical Society. He is one of the creators of the earliest chemistry laboratory for undergraduates at University College London, and is also known for the creation of mechanics' institutes in Scotland and London. He was President of the Medical and Chirurgical Society of London in 1825.

== Early life and education ==
Birkbeck was born on 10 January 1776 to a Quaker family in Settle, West Riding of Yorkshire. His mother was Sarah and his father, William, was a merchant and banker.

Birkbeck went to Sedbergh School and then studied medicine at Leeds and London before completing his training as a doctor at the University of Edinburgh Medical School in 1799 with an MD degree.

== Career ==
Before practising as a physician, he embarked on an academic career, being appointed professor of natural philosophy at the Andersonian Institute in Glasgow, which later became the University of Strathclyde. After mechanics started asking questions about the apparatus he used in his lectures, he had the idea of holding free, public lectures on the "mechanical arts" (c. 1800-1804). These Saturday evening events proved very popular and continued after his departure to London. His fourth annual lecture attracted a crowd of 500, and became an annual occurrence, leading to the formation in 1821 of the first mechanics' institute in Edinburgh (the Edinburgh School of Arts). These new institutions gave classes, and included libraries, and apparatus to be used for experiments and technical education.

In 1804 he set up in practice in the City of London and became acquainted with George Grote, Henry Brougham, and "many other men of liberal ideas". In 1809 he assisted in founding the London Institution.

Working as a doctor in London in 1823, Birkbeck, along with Brougham, Jeremy Bentham and John Hobhouse came together to discuss the education for the working men of London. To achieve this they established the London Mechanics Institute in November 1823, of which Birkbeck was the first president in 1824. He also laid the foundation stone of the building in 1825.

== Death and legacy ==
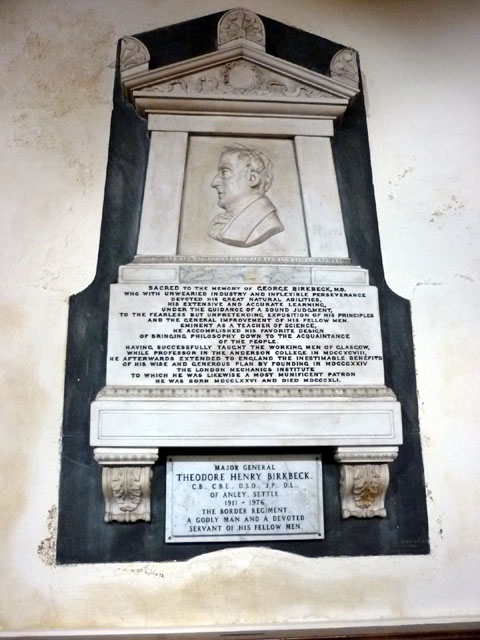
Memorial to George Birkbeck in St Alkelda's Giggleswick

He died on 1 December 1841 at his home in Finsbury Square and was buried in Kensal Green Cemetery, London.

There is a monument in St Akelda's Church in Giggleswick, near his birthplace in Settle.

Birkbeck's association with the ground-breaking London Institution was marked by it being renamed the Birkbeck Literary and Scientific Institution in 1866 (now, as Birkbeck College, part of the University of London). The College moved to its present buildings (Malet Street, London WC1) in 1951, but the original foundation stone as well as a memorial tablet have been retained and are in the entrance hall.

The mechanics' institute concept was quickly adopted in numerous other cities and towns across the UK and overseas, and Birkbeck is remembered for having been a co-founder of this model of education and philanthropy.

== Family ==
He married Catherine Lloyd in 1806 but she died in childbirth in 1807, leaving a son, William Lloyd Birkbeck. He remarried Anna Gardner in 1817, and they had three sons and three daughters.

He is of the same Birkbeck family as early 19th-century Illinois pioneer and social reformer Morris Birkbeck.

== References and sources ==
Sources

- Gilman, D. C.; Peck, H. T.; Colby, F. M., eds. (1905). "Birkbeck, George" . New International Encyclopedia (1st ed.). New York: Dodd, Mead.
- Chisholm, Hugh, ed. (1911). "Birkbeck, George" . Encyclopædia Britannica. Vol. 3 (11th ed.). Cambridge University Press.
