= Graham Virgo =

English legal scholar

Graham Virgo KC (Hon)
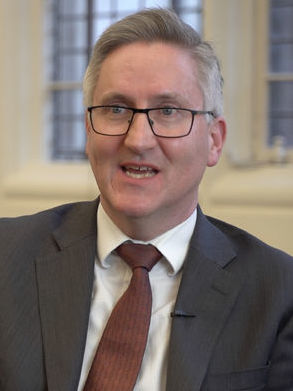
- Virgo at an interview with Varsity Newspaper in 2020
- Born: Graham John Virgo; 8 June 1966 (age 60)
- Occupations: Professor of English Private Law and Senior Pro-Vice-Chancellor at the University of Cambridge
- Spouse: The Rev Dr Carolyn John-Baptist Hammond
- Children: 2

Academic background
- Education: Downing College, Cambridge; Christ Church, Oxford

Academic work
- Discipline: Lawyer
- Sub-discipline: Law of restitution, unjust enrichment, law of mistake
- Institutions: Downing College, Cambridge
- Main interests: Law of restitution, Law of contract, Equity, trusts, criminal law
- Notable works: The Principles of the Law of Restitution, The Principles of Equity and Trusts, Equity & Trusts: Cases and Materials
- Website: University of Cambridge

Graham John Virgo KC (Hon) (born 8 June 1966) is an English legal academic, barrister and university administrator, who is Professor of English Private Law at the University of Cambridge and Master of Downing College, Cambridge. He is frequently cited in the English courts and those of other common law jurisdictions, and known for his contributions to the law of restitution and the teaching of law. He was previously Senior Pro-Vice-Chancellor at the University of Cambridge and assumed the role of Master of Downing College, Cambridge, on 1 October 2023.

== Early life and education ==
Virgo was born on 8 June 1966 in Nuneaton, Warwickshire, England. He was educated at John Cleveland College (now The Hinckley School), a comprehensive school in Hinckley, Leicestershire.

In 1983, he applied to read law at Downing College, Cambridge, where he was interviewed by Charles Harpum, John Hopkins, and David Lloyd Jones. Later, Hopkins suggested that Virgo consider Coward Chance (which in 1987 merged with Clifford Turner to form Clifford Chance) as a firm to work for. He graduated from Cambridge in 1987 with a first-class honours Bachelor of Arts (BA) degree; as per tradition, his BA was later promoted to a Master of Arts (MA Cantab) degree. He then moved to Christ Church, Oxford to undertake the postgraduate Bachelor of Civil Law (BCL) degree. He graduated from the University of Oxford with his BCL degree in 1988, and won the Vinerian Scholarship for the best performance in that degree that year.

== Career ==
Upon graduation, Virgo decided on a career at the Bar. He studied at the Inns of Court School of Law, and was called to the bar at Lincoln Inn in 1989.

=== As an academic ===
In 1989, rather than make a career as a barrister he returned to Downing College, Cambridge, where he had been elected a fellow in law. He additionally became a lecturer in the Faculty of Law, University of Cambridge in 1992. In 2003, he was promoted to reader in law. From 2003 to 2013, he served as senior tutor at Downing College. In 2007, he was appointed to a personal Professorship of English Private Law at the University of Cambridge. In 2008, he was elected an Academic Bencher at Lincoln's Inn. In 2012, he was appointed deputy chair of the Faculty of Law, University of Cambridge. He stepped down from this role in 2014.

Virgo's research interests are in criminal law, restitution, the law of contract, equity and trusts. He described the decision of the Supreme Court of the United Kingdom in Bank of Cyprus UK Ltd v Menelaou as "the worst decision in the history of the Supreme Court, betraying such ignorance of the law and legal principle and such confusion about the nature of judging", prompting Lord Neuberger, who had delivered the leading judgment, to lament the article as "over-the top" in his retirement lecture at Oxford. In 2009, he delivered a paper at the Law Society of England and Wales titled The Law of Unjust Enrichment in the House of Lords: Judging the Judges.

Virgo is credited with contributions to the growing law of restitution in the United Kingdom. In 2014, he was the Miegunyah Distinguished Visiting Law Fellow at the University of Melbourne law school. Virgo was the New Zealand Law Foundation's Distinguished Visiting Fellow in 2016, during which he gave lectures at various universities including the University of Auckland, University of Canterbury, University of Otago and University of Waikato. In 2017, he was appointed Queen's counsel (honoris causa) in recognition of his work in restitution. In 2019, he was the Jones Day Visiting Professor in Commercial Law at Singapore Management University. His work has been frequently cited in the English courts, including in the Supreme Court, and has shaped the direction of the law of unjust enrichment, mistake, and other related areas of restitution.

=== As a teacher and Tutor at Downing College ===
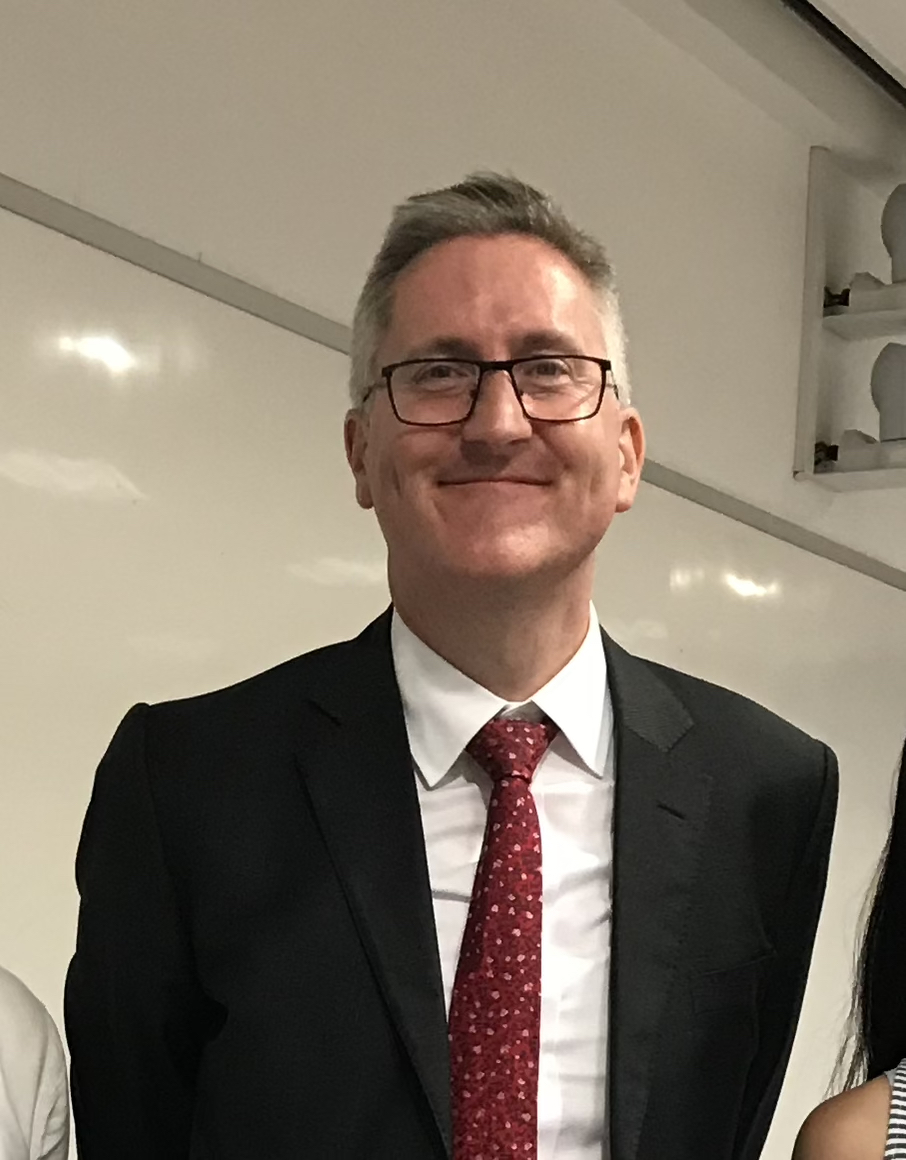
Virgo at a lecture in Singapore in 2019

Virgo has described his teaching and pastoral style as being influenced by his former Tutor, John Hopkins. In particular, he describes having learnt how to interview, supervise, and develop a genuine fondness for his students from him. In 2002, he was awarded the Pilkington Prize from the University of Cambridge in recognition of outstanding teaching in Law. On 1 April 2003, he was appointed Senior Tutor of Downing College, a role which gave him responsibility over both educational matters and the overall well-being of the students at the College. He stayed in this role until 2013. When he stepped down as Senior Tutor, he described the students of Downing College as having made his time as Senior Tutor "the happiest of [his] life". In 2004, he was appointed Director of Studies for Law at Downing College. He stepped down as Director of Studies in 2014.

In 2013, Virgo engaged in a debate with Lord Sumption at the University of Cambridge on the topic "Those Who Wish to Practise Law Should Not Study Law at University", arguing against the motion. That year, Virgo was also a finalist for both the OUP Law Teacher of the Year and the LawCareers.net Law Teacher of the Year Award. In 2017, when he was appointed Queen's counsel (honoris causa), the announcement celebrated his "significant contribution to the teaching of law".

On 30 November 2022 Downing College announced that Virgo would succeed Alan Bookbinder as Master of the College on 1 October 2023.

=== As a university administrator ===
He was appointed pro-vice-chancellor of education in 2014, with responsibility for developing education policy and strategy for the university. Virgo has addressed problems of sexual misconduct within the University of Cambridge and suggested that the University may phase out the traditional academic 1st/2.i/2.ii/3rd system with a US-style GPA system in an attempt to stem grade inflation.

In 2019, Virgo was criticised after he was reported to have said that the lack of Afro-Caribbean hairdressers in Cambridge led to fewer black students to apply to the university, although he later said his remarks had been misunderstood.

In 2020, Virgo played an important role in University of Cambridge's decision to force all students to be onsite during the Covid pandemic. When he was asked by the representatives from Student Union "whether the University wanted to 'put students at the risk of their live'", he replied "an essential part of the Cambridge education was being in Cambridge and getting the benefits of that".

In 2021, Virgo was criticized by Professor David Abulafia, emeritus professor of Mediterranean history at the University of Cambridge, for his support of the "Report+Support" university reporting system, which allowed users to anonymously report members of the University for 'micro-aggressions' before it was withdrawn by the University.

== Personal life ==
Virgo is keenly interested in drama and is Chairman of the Cambridge University Theatre Committee as well as the vice-chair of the Gamlingay Players dramatic society.

Virgo is married to the Rev Dr Carolyn Hammond, a classicist and Anglican priest. She is Director of Studies in Theology and Dean of Gonville and Caius College, Cambridge. He has two children, Elizabeth and Jonathan.

== Selected publications ==
- Graham Virgo, The Principles of Equity and Trusts (5th ed, 2023)
- Graham Virgo and Paul Davies, Equity & Trusts: Cases and Materials (4th ed, 2025)
- Graham Virgo, The Principles of the Law of Restitution (4th ed, 2024)
