= An Essay on Marxian Economics =

1942 book by Joan Robinson

- Cover of the first edition
- Author: Joan Robinson
- Language: English
- Subject: Karl Marx
- Published: 1942
- Publication place: United Kingdom
- Media type: Print (Hardcover and Paperback)
- ISBN: 0333058003

An Essay on Marxian Economics is an analytical essay written in 1942 by economist Joan Robinson. The essay deals with the orthodox teachings of capital accumulation, the essential demand crisis and real wages by comparing it to Karl Marx's Das Kapital. It is a wide-ranging critique on Marx and Orthodox economics while also arguing for a long-term economic view that builds on the problems that Marx first identified in the exploitative nature of capitalism.

== History ==
Robinson was writing in a time where academic economics was beginning to revisit questions of macroeconomics and long terms systems of capitalism. English economists such as Alfred Marshall had concentrated on ideas of cost production, supply and demand and the marginal utility of money in his famous textbook Principles of Economics. This encouraged a mathematical modelling of economics throughout British academia that transformed the discipline throughout the interwar years.

In this context, Robinson drew on the ideas of John Maynard Keynes and the branch of economics called Keynesian economics which broadly focused on aggregate government spending, taxation, the rate of unemployment and average levels of inflations. Robinson herself considered Keynes' The General Theory too narrow in its focus, and attempted to synthesise her own dynamic analysis of economics through a post-Keynesian lens in her essay.

== Preface ==
She begins in her preface to the second edition of her essay by analysing the state of mid-20th-century economics which is beginning to shift from a static focus of economics concerned with mathematical equilibriums towards a concentration on exploitation and the classical labour value theory:

Nowadays the academics are impatient of static analysis; the classical problems of growth and development have come back into fashion, reviving interest in the classical economists and Marx amongst them.

She then goes on to outline the key aspects of Marxian economics that challenge the economic orthodoxy. She critiques the metaphysical emphasis on value which she compares to the profit and wages of workers, "As a logical process, the ratio of profits to wages for each individual commodity, can be calculated when the rate of profit is known" (XI).

In the same way that the profits of a company determine the wages of the worker, the prices of commodities transform the value of the product and its labour, not the other way around. For Marx, a commodity receives its value from its labour, which is the accumulation of hours, manpower and technical conditions a product is made in. Yet for Robinson, although the value of labour is an accurate starting point, it does not consider the real-life effects of climate, fertility and the conventions of free markets (XIX), as some areas produce more agricultural output primarily due to the better crop growing conditions.

Hence the value of the labour is not equal to the value of the commodity across different regions that work the same hours and produce the same product. Robinson also identifies a problem with quantifying the equality of work with the equality of wages, as the style of life between an agricultural labour force and an urban career individual are drastically different. (XIX)

== The labour theory of value ==
In her first chapter, Robinson revisits the concept of the labour theory of value by offering critiques while reaffirming the core principles of Marxism. The labour theory of value argues that products and commodities get their worth from the labour put into them.

In Robinson's view, Marx saw this theory as an equilibrium, a balance between the demand of society and the social labour time of a product which drove the market's prices (23). But there are two difficulties with this; first, how can equal work be assessed? (XIX). If two workers labour the same number of hours and produce a quality that is different in a product, how do you measure which one is worth more by their labour? Secondly, natural elements of land fertility, climate and the convenience of markets also change the quality of a product regardless of how hard any two workers labour (XIX). Although this leads to unequal distributions, Marx still identified a key problem in the exploitation of labour in capitalist systems (28). Robinson argues that governments should instead take into account the disadvantages faced by workers and assess their work based on their differential circumstances (XXI). These features of planning will allow for each individual to receive a share of their contribution to society (24).

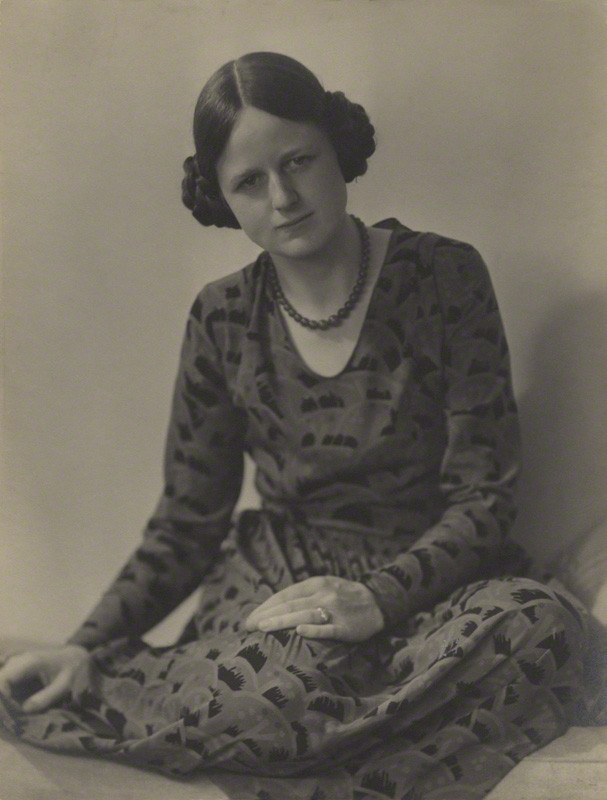
Joan Robinson

== Theory of employment and profit ==
The long theory of employment argues unemployment only occurs when wages are above the line of what a business is able to sell in accordance with what it planned to.

Robinson argues employment depends on the amount of capital in circulation and the exploitation of capitalists (29). She sympathised with Marx's ideas that the rate of wages and employment varied based on the wider class struggle and the average share of profit accumulated by the economic system (34). For example, if capital in an economy decreases, the wages may decline but the capitalist will still gain profits by making labourers work more hours, include women and children in the workforce while simultaneously increasing the workload (30-31).

However, Marx was wrong to assume that wages would fall as capitalists made work easier with new technology but was right in identifying the importance of trade unions to push for increased wages (33). Hence, Robinson critiques the absolute theory of labour in regard to productive output and takes a relative approach which takes into account the differences in standard of living, inflation and labour-saving techniques (33).

== Effective demand ==
Effective demand refers to the intentions of a consumer to purchase a product based on their income and the supply of that product. If those things are interrupted, the effective demand and the consumer's ability to purchase based on his intentions are undermined.

Orthodox economists in the view of Robinson, do not address the effective demand problem in capitalism which is the restriction of markets and the different prices of products across economies (43). Marx argued this system was built entirely on consumption and therefore assumed a theory of falling profits (44). Robinson argues Marx identified the correct issue in effective demand but because of his theory of falling profits he was unable to offer a sufficient alternative (51).

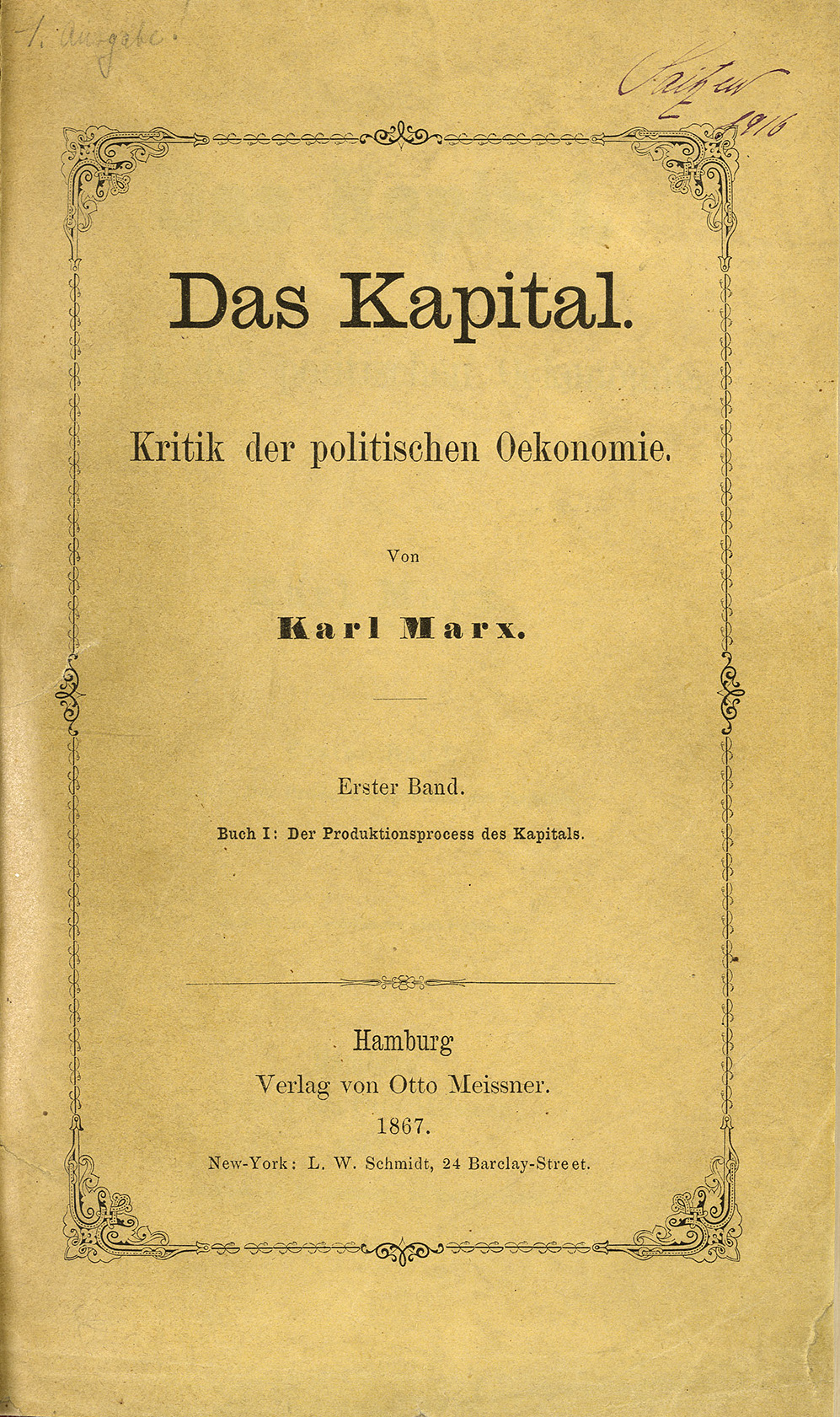
First edition title page of Volume I (1867) written by Karl Marx. Published by Verlag von Otto Meisner. This book was the subject of Robinson's essay on Marxian economics

Orthodox theory in comparison could not reconcile the fall in investments, because capitalist economies were more concerned about short term capital accumulation which would offset future investments (61). The Marxist interpretation which states that capitalism needs to accumulate capital in order to survive is therefore a better analysis for Robinson (61). This is because capitalism requires profits to grow, causing a restriction in markets and over consumption without long term investments (62).

== Imperfect competition ==
Imperfect competition refers to the failure of a market to fulfil the optimal level of distribution, resource allocation, production, employment and other economic factors.

For Robinson, the Orthodox view of short-term employment is based on the idea that the productivity of capital stock determines the rate of profit (63). Yet as Keynes points out, this idea that guaranteed investment leads to sustained increase in profits rests on the assumption that an economy has full employment (65). This leaves no room for unemployment, which is a natural phenomenon in all economic systems (65). Therefore, there is an imperfect distribution of competition in the market.

If people save money in the community this does not raise investments. Instead, when a person invests their money, income and activity increases by the new products and services created, therefore making a rise in savings. Hence, in a capitalist system, "maldistribution of income is quite as deeply imbedded" (72). Alternatively, Robinson states that the power of trade unions can stop the unequal distribution of capital between labourers (81).

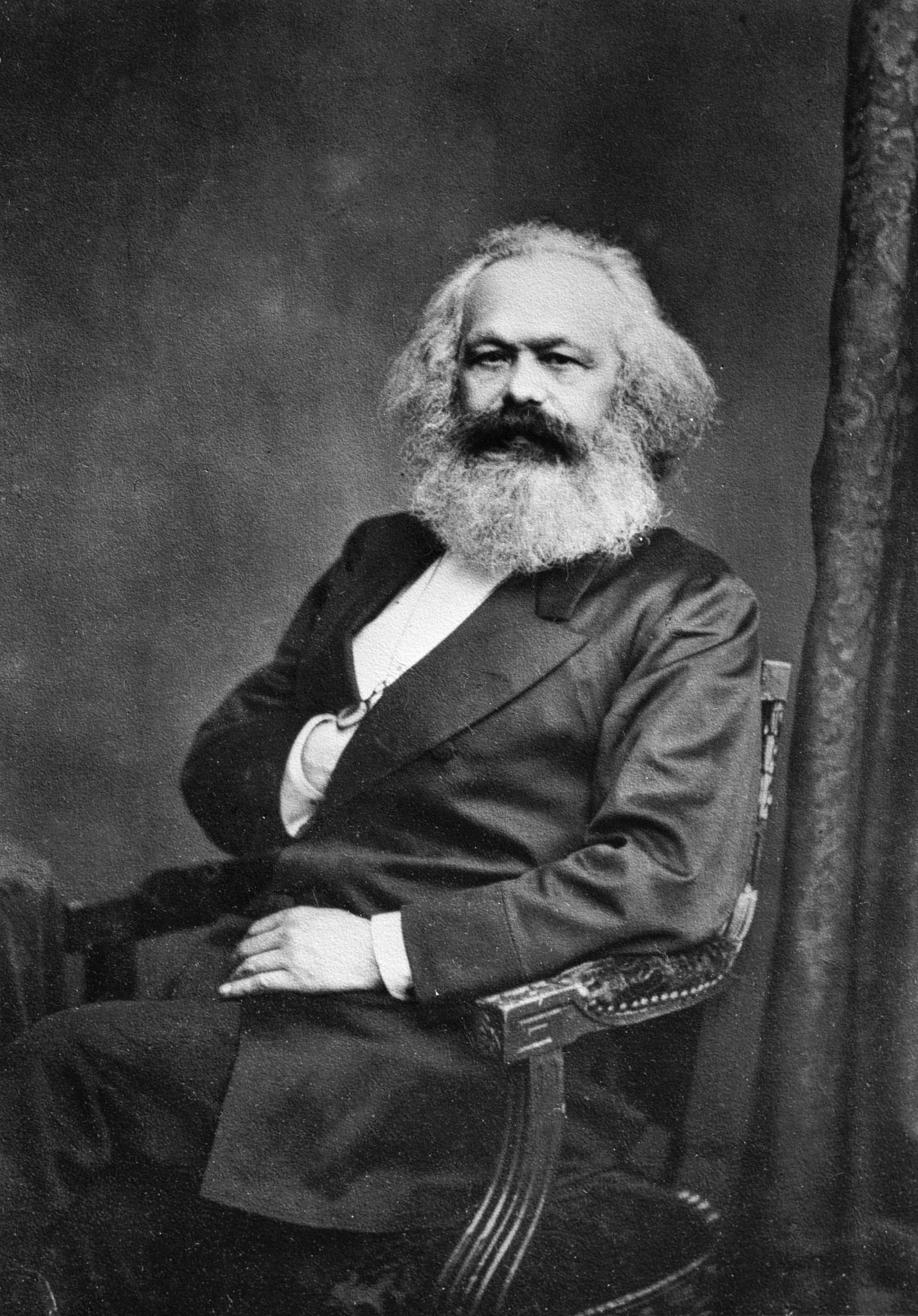
Portrait of Karl Marx 1875. Joan Robinson critiques but also affirms parts of Marx's philosophy, his writing at the centre of her work.

== Real and money wages ==
Money wages are the money given by an employer to the worker in a business organisation, while real wages take into account other factors such as inflation and purchasing power to properly account for the labour and costs involved within an economy.

Under the orthodox view, a rise in money wages through the bargaining of workers and the employer through trade unions will lead to a rise in real wages (82). Although money wages may increase, the real wages of workers which allows them to buy an equivalent amount of goods and services may not be the same. This is because a rise in wages often leads to a rise in cost which is shared across the community making little difference to the purchasing power of the workers' wages (81).

Robinson argues as Keynes does, that an increase in money wages can actually increase employment because, 'Wages are more fully spent than profits, and a transfer of purchasing power from capitalists to workers stimulates the demand for consumption goods and so tends to increase employment' (90).

In comparison to Marx, they both agree that a rise in money wages has little effect on real wages, but if money wages fall it could either help expansion for Marx or do nothing but harm for Keynes (91). Ultimately, Robinson sympathises with Marx but sides with Keynes, as the 1930s interwar period showed that falling wages did not result in capital expansion (91).

== Dynamic analysis ==
In Robinson's view, the goal of the economist is to build off the ideas started by Marx and refined by Keynes to analyse short term consequences by looking at the larger structures in place that result in bigger changes over time. She leans towards a solution of "realistic investigation' to which Marx started to answer but could not finish (94-95). Comparatively, 'The theory of short-period fluctuations in effective demand, opened up by Mr. Keynes's General Theory, has already made great progress. Marx was mainly concerned with long-run dynamic analysis, and this field is still largely untilled. Orthodox academic analysis, bound up with the concept of equilibrium, makes little contribution to it, and the modern theory has not yet gone much beyond the confines of the short period.' (95)

The long-term changes that Marx identified in rates of profit, real wages and class structures are the building blocks for further academic methods to analysis the broader laws of capitalism. If Orthodox economists cannot move past short term fluctuations with wages, profits and capital accumulation, they will fail to address the larger long-term effects (95).

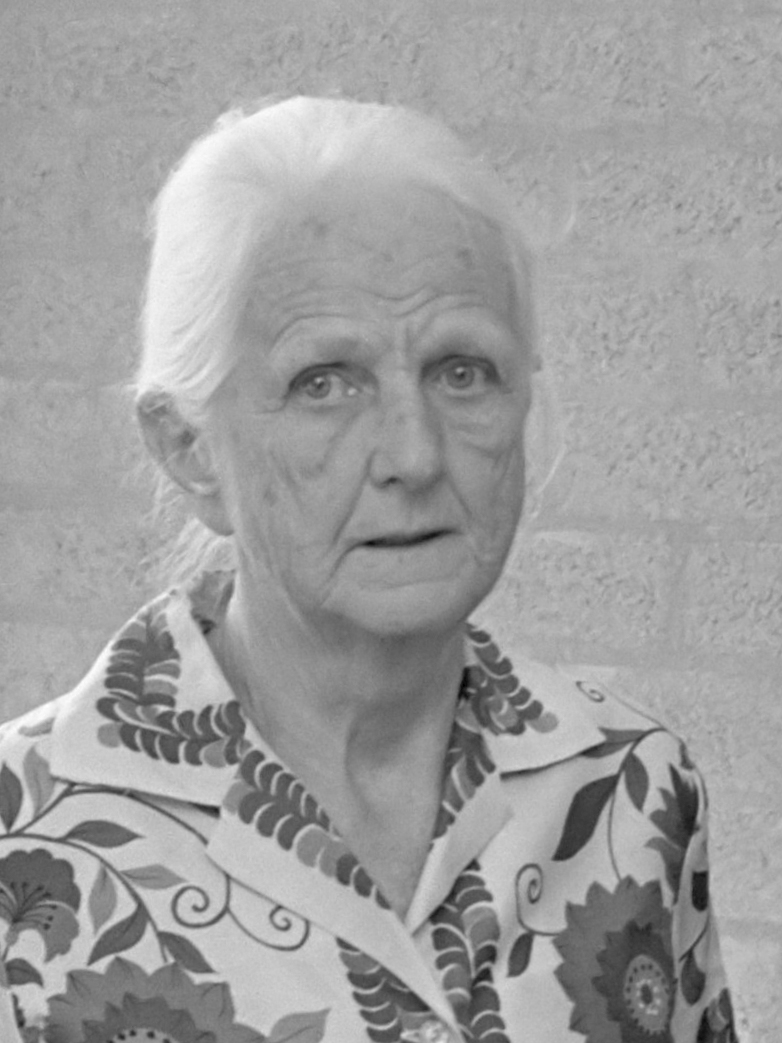
Joan Robinson in 1973

== Reception ==
An Essay on Marxian Economics received a variety of reviews from Marxists and orthodox economists. In 1944, British economist Gerald Shove wrote an analytical review in The Economic Journal in Oxford where he criticised Robinson for missing the contradictions of price and value between Volume I and Volume III of Capital. Shove also criticises Robinson's view that Marx believed socialist economies should sell their commodities at an average price if the margin is greater than the average. However, is largely supportive of the wider discussion that Robinson is provoking that re-states core issues of value theory and income distribution which are in Shove's mind long "overdue."

British academic Eric Roll showed appreciation towards her unifying focus on Marx's system in regard to exploitation and employment and compared her essay to Paul Sweezy's The Theory of Capitalist Development (1942) in importance. Other Marxist figures saw the challenged Robinson's stance which did not fully appreciate the intellectual climate of Karl Marx before the events of post war Europe and pointed towards the broader importance of Marxist economics which was focused on social change and transformation.

The American Political Science Review referred to it as having "deservedly achieved its reputation as probably the best critical introduction to Marxian economics." In modern economics, Fletcher Barager argued Robinson's critiques of Marx were not destructive but constructively building on the ideas of labour value theory, capital accumulation and effective demand crisis. The Marxian economist Ernest Mandel accused Robinson of misinterpretations of Marx similar to those of the socialist economist Rosa Luxemburg. He rejected Robinson's view that the first and third volumes of Marx's Das Kapital make contradictory assumptions about real wages. He argued that Robinson fails to understand that the first and third volumes are at different levels of abstraction, deal with different questions, and make different assumptions in order to clarify the specific dynamics which allow answers to them.

== See also ==
- Rudolf Hilferding
