= Charles Smith (mathematician) =

British academic

Charles Smith (b Huntingdon, 11 May 1844; d Cambridge 13 November 1916) was a 20th-century British academic.

Smith was educated at Sidney Sussex College, Cambridge. He became a Fellow of Sidney Sussex in 1868; Tutor in 1875; and Master in 1890. He was Vice-Chancellor of the University of Cambridge from 1895 to 1897.

Academic offices
Preceded by Robert Phelps	Master of Sidney Sussex College, Cambridge; 1890–1918	Succeeded by George Weekes
Preceded by Augustus Austen Leigh	Vice-Chancellor of the University of Cambridge; 1895–1897	Succeeded by Alexander Hill
