= Joan Robinson =

English economist (1903–1983)

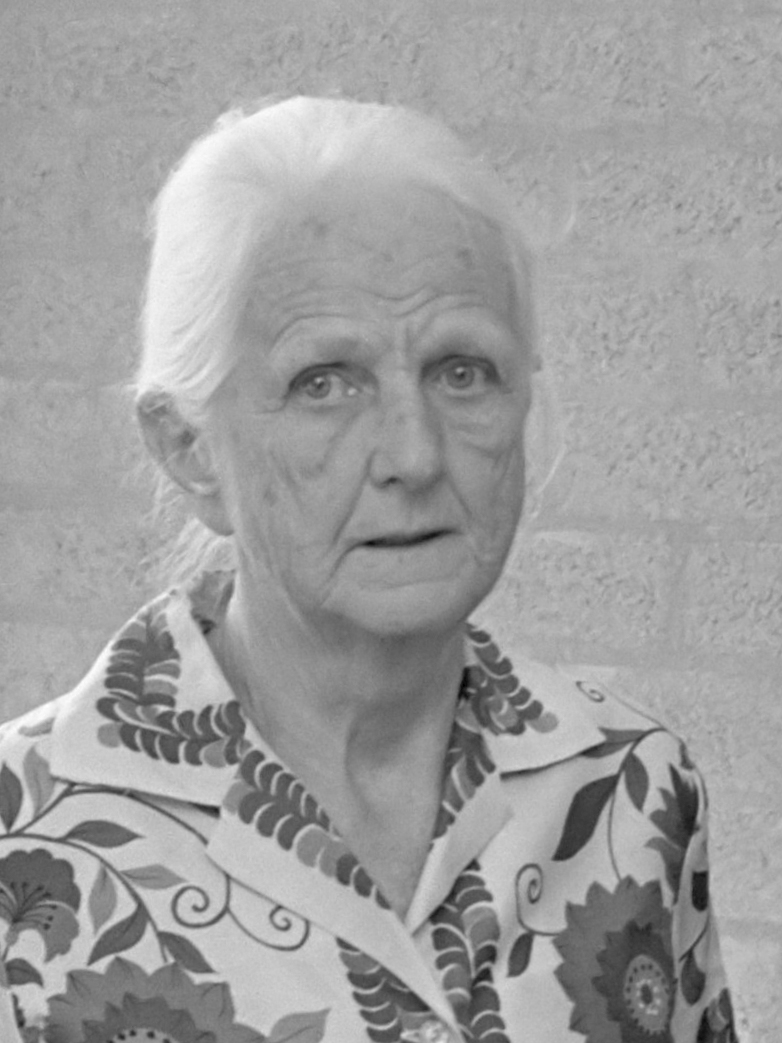
- Robinson in 1973
- Born: Joan Violet Maurice; 31 October 1903; Surrey, England
- Died: 5 August 1983 (aged 79); Cambridge, England
- Spouse: Austin Robinson (m. 1926)
- Children: 2

Academic background
- Influences: Adam Smith, Karl Marx, John Maynard Keynes, Piero Sraffa, Michał Kalecki

Academic work
- Discipline: Monetary economics
- School or tradition: Post-Keynesian economics
- Doctoral students: Amartya Sen
- Notable ideas: Joan Robinson's growth model Amoroso–Robinson relation Monopsony theory Imperfect competition

Joan Violet Robinson FBA (née Maurice; 31 October 1903 – 5 August 1983) was a British economist known for her wide-ranging contributions to economic theory. Her 1933 book, The Economics of Imperfect Competition, developed an analysis of imperfect competition and brought her international recognition. She started out as a Marshallian, became one of the earliest and most ardent Keynesians after 1936, and ended up as a leader of the neo-Ricardian and post-Keynesian schools.

== Early life and education ==
Before leaving to fight in the Second Boer War, Joan's father, Frederick Maurice, married Margaret Helen Marsh, the daughter of Frederick Howard Marsh, and the sister of Edward Marsh, at St George's, Hanover Square. Joan Violet Maurice was born in Camberley, Surrey, in 1903, a year after her father's return from Africa. She was the third of five siblings.

Joan Maurice studied economics at Girton College, Cambridge. She completed her studies in 1925 but due to Cambridge University's refusal to grant degrees to women until 1948, she did not formally graduate. Following her marriage to economist Austin Robinson the next year, she became known as Joan Robinson.

The couple moved to India shortly after their marriage where Joan Robinson became interested in the relations between the British Raj and the Indian princely states and wrote a report on the subject. This time in India was a formative experience on Robinson, shaping her future research interest in both the country and her studies of developing economies. In 1928, the couple returned to Cambridge and Robinson started teaching in the early 1930s as a Junior Assistant Lecturer.

== Career ==
Robinson crossed swords with the economist Marjorie Hollond, Girton's director of studies, over the teaching of economics. Robinson wanted to teach the latest economic theories whereas Hollond believed that they were as yet unproven. In 1937, Robinson became a lecturer in economics at the University of Cambridge. She joined the British Academy in 1958 and was elected a fellow of Newnham College in 1962. In 1965 she assumed the position of full professor and fellow of Girton College. In 1979, just four years before she died, she became the first female honorary fellow of King's College.

As a member of "the Cambridge School" of economics, Robinson contributed to the support and exposition of Keynes' General Theory, writing especially on its employment implications in 1936 and 1937 (it attempted to explain employment dynamics in the midst of the Great Depression).

During World War II, Robinson worked on a few different committees for the wartime national government. During this time, she visited the Soviet Union as well as China, gaining an interest in underdeveloped and developing nations.

Robinson was a frequent visitor to the Centre for Development Studies (CDS), Thiruvananthapuram, India. She was a visiting fellow at the Centre in the mid-1970s. She instituted an endowment fund to support public lectures at the centre. She was a frequent visitor to the centre until January 1982 and participated in all activities of the centre and especially student seminars. Professor Robinson donated royalties of two of her books (Selected Economic Writings, Bombay: Oxford University Press, 1974, Introduction to Modern Economics (jointly with John Eatwell), Delhi; Tata McGraw Hill, 1974) to CDS.

Robinson also made several trips to China, reporting her observations and analyses in China: An Economic Perspective (1958), The Cultural Revolution in China (1969), and Economic Management in China (1975; 3rd edn, 1976), in which she praised the Cultural Revolution. In October 1964, Robinson also visited North Korea, which was effectively a single-party Communist state, and wrote in her report "Korean Miracle" that the country's success was due to "the intense concentration of the Koreans on national pride" under Kim Il Sung, "a messiah rather than a dictator." She also stated in reference to the division of Korea that "[o]bviously, sooner or later the country must be reunited by absorbing the South into socialism." During her last decade, she became more and more pessimistic about the possibilities of reforming economic theory, as expressed, for example, in her essay "Spring Cleaning."

Robinson was a strict vegetarian. She slept in a small unheated hut at the bottom of her garden all year round.

== Works ==
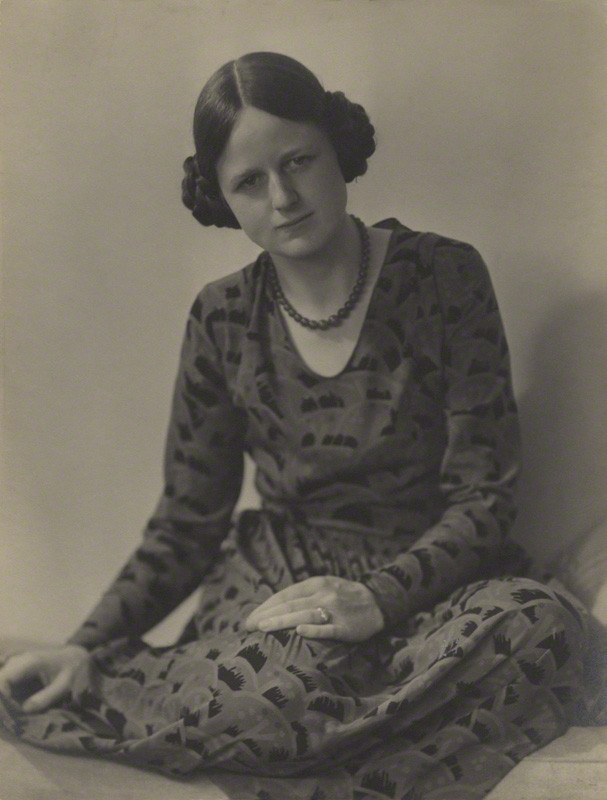
Joan Robinson in the 1920s

In 1933, her book The Economics of Imperfect Competition, Robinson coined the term "monopsony", which is used to describe the buyer converse of a seller monopoly. Monopsony is commonly applied to buyers of labour, where the employer has wage setting power that allows it to exercise Pigouvian exploitation and pay workers less than their marginal productivity. Robinson used monopsony to describe the wage gap between women and men workers of equal productivity.

In 1942, Robinson's An Essay on Marxian Economics famously concentrated on Karl Marx as an economist, helping to revive the debate on this aspect of his legacy.

In 1956, Robinson published her magnum opus, The Accumulation of Capital, which extended Keynesianism into the long run.

In 1962, she published Essays in the Theory of Economic Growth, another book on growth theory, which discussed Golden Age growth paths. Afterwards, she developed the Cambridge growth theory with Nicholas Kaldor. She was elected a Foreign Honorary Member of the American Academy of Arts and Sciences in 1964.

In 1964 she made important contributions to the field of economic methodology. She explored the philosophical foundations of economic analysis in her influential book Economic Philosophy, criticizing traditional methodological approaches and arguing in favor of a more diverse and interdisciplinary approach to economics. She promoted a more practical and historically informed approach that considers the social and institutional environment within which economic phenomena occur.

In 1984, Robinson was elected to the American Philosophical Society.

Near the end of her life, she studied and concentrated on methodological problems in economics and tried to recover the original message of Keynes' General Theory. Between 1962 and 1980, she wrote many economics books for the general public. Robinson suggested developing an alternative to the revival of classical economics.

The Cultural Revolution in China, 1969, is written from the perspective of trying to understand the thinking that lay behind the revolution, particularly Mao Zedong's preoccupations. She visited China for the fifth time in preparation for this book.

In June 2019, the United States Supreme Court used Robinson's monopsony theory in its decision for Apple v. Pepper. Justice Brett Kavanaugh delivered the majority opinion, stating Apple can be sued by application developers, "on a monopsony theory."

== Achievements ==
In 1945, she was appointed to the Ministry of Works' Advisory Committee on Building Research, the only economist and the only female member of that committee.

In 1948, she was appointed the first economist member of the Monopolies and Mergers Commission.

In 1949, she was invited by Ragnar Frisch to become the vice-president of the Econometric Society but declined by saying she that could not be part of the editorial committee of a journal that she could not read.

During the 1960s, she was a major participant in the Cambridge capital controversy alongside Piero Sraffa.

At least two students who studied under her have won the Sveriges Riksbank Prize in Economic Sciences in Memory of Alfred Nobel; they are Amartya Sen and Joseph Stiglitz. In his autobiographical notes for the Nobel Foundation, Stiglitz described their relationship as "tumultuous" and Robinson as unused to "the kind of questioning stance of a brash American student"; after a term, Stiglitz therefore "switched to Frank Hahn". In his own autobiography notes, Sen described Robinson as "totally brilliant but vigorously intolerant."

She, along with Nicholas Kaldor, also greatly influenced Indian Prime Minister Manmohan Singh in his approach towards economic policies.

=== Discussion surrounding the Nobel Prize ===
Robinson never received a Nobel Prize for her contribution to economics. She was widely anticipated to receive the prize for Economics in 1975, and Rachel Reeves described her as 'the most famous economist not to be awarded the Nobel Prize'. Of all 93 recipients of the Nobel Prize in Economic Science, only 10 winners have been cited more widely than Robinson. It is widely assumed that the committee's oversight of Robinson was due to ideological bias within the awarding committee against her support of Mao's economic policies in China, while others have argued this was instead due to sexist biases.

== Family ==
Robinson's father was Frederick Maurice, her mother was Margaret Helen Marsh. The London surgeon and Cambridge academic Howard Marsh was Joan Robinson's maternal grandfather.

Joan Maurice married fellow economist Austin Robinson in 1926. They had two daughters.

== Recognition ==
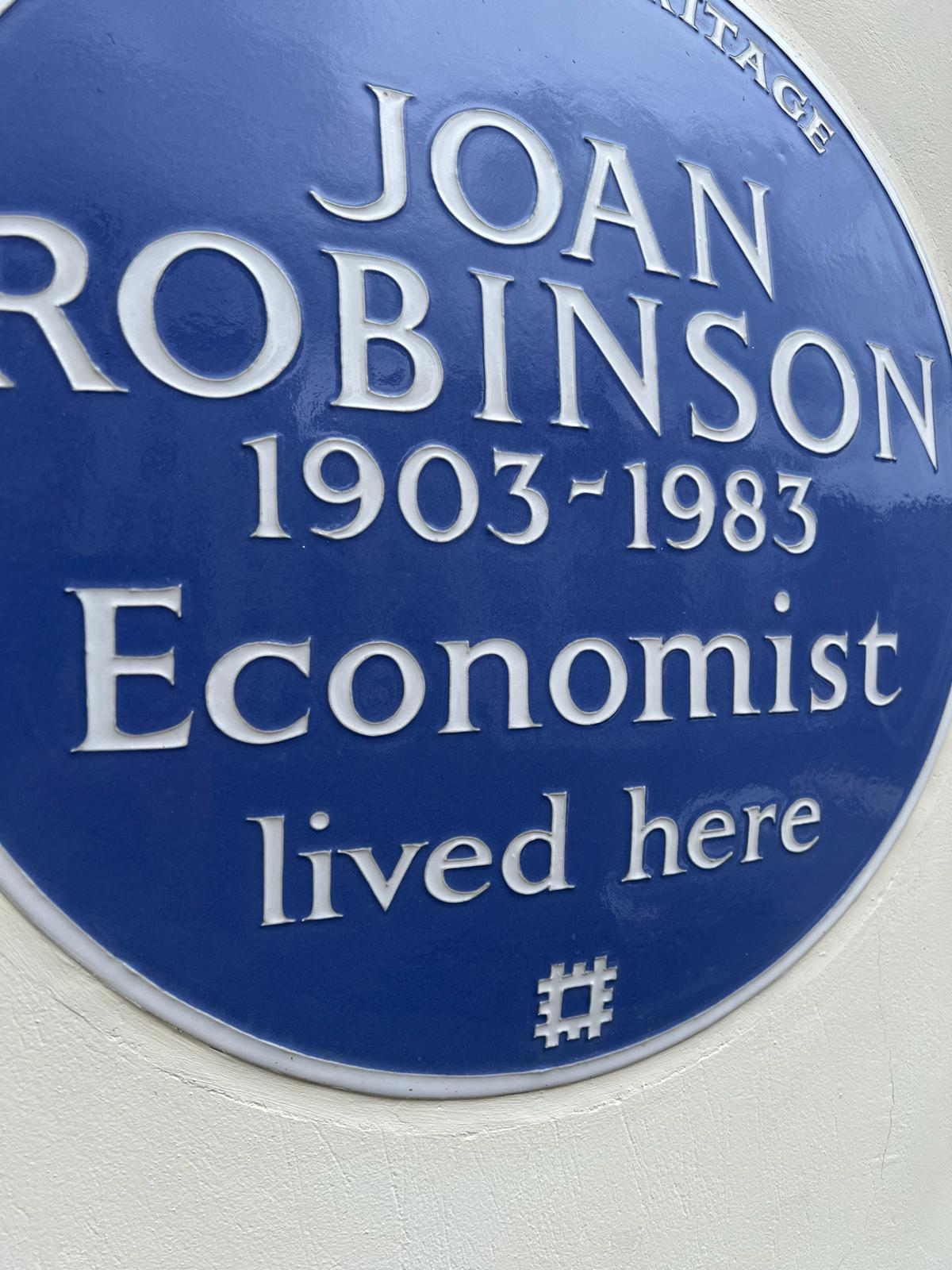
Joan Robinson's blue plaque.

In 2016, the Council of the University of Cambridge approved the use of Robinson's name to mark a physical feature within the North West Cambridge Development.

In 2021, the Gunnar Myrdal Prize (established in 1992 by the European Association for Evolutionary Political Economy) was renamed to the Joan Robinson Prize. It is awarded biennially for the best monograph on a theme broadly in accord with the EAEPE theoretical perspectives. Another prize of the same name, awarded annually by the Review of Political Economy since 2024, is awarded to the best paper published in the journal by a young scholar (PhD candidates and scholars up to five years after the completion of their PhD). The prize, worth ₤1000, is sponsored by Taylor & Francis.

In April 2024, a blue plaque was erected in Kensington Gardens, London, to honour Robinson's life and work. English Heritage, the awarding organisation, described her as "one of the first women to achieve academic prominence in the discipline of economics".

The economics society of Girton College, Cambridge is named the Joan Robinson Society.

== Major works ==
- The Economics of Imperfect Competition (1933)
- Essays in the Theory of Employment (1937)
- An Essay on Marxian Economics (1942), 2nd Edition (1966) (The Macmillan Press Ltd, ISBN 0333058003)
- "The Production Function and the Theory of Capital", The Review of Economic Studies (1953)
- The Accumulation of Capital (1956)
- Exercises in Economic Analysis (1960)
- Essays in the Theory of Economic Growth (1962)
- Economic Philosophy: An Essay on the Progress of Economic Thought (1962)
- Freedom and Necessity: An Introduction to the Study of Society (1970)
- Economic Heresies: Some Old Fashioned Questions in Economic Theory (1971) (Basic Books, New York, ISBN 046501786X)
- Contributions to Modern Economics (1978) (Basil Blackwell, Oxford, ISBN 0631192204)
- Further Contributions to Modern Economics (1980) (Basil Blackwell, Oxford, ISBN 0631126244)

=== Texts for the lay reader ===
- Economics Is a Serious Subject: The Apologia of an Economist to the Mathematician, the Scientist and the Plain Man (1932), W. Heffer & Sons
- Introduction to the Theory of Employment (1937)
- The Cultural Revolution in China, Harmondsworth: Pelican Original (1969)
- An Introduction to Modern Economics (1973) with John Eatwell
- The Arms Race (1981), Tanner Lectures on Human Values

== See also ==
- International economics
- List of economists
- Macroeconomics
- Wealth condensation
- Welfare economics
