= Catherine Hobbs =

British mathematician and educator

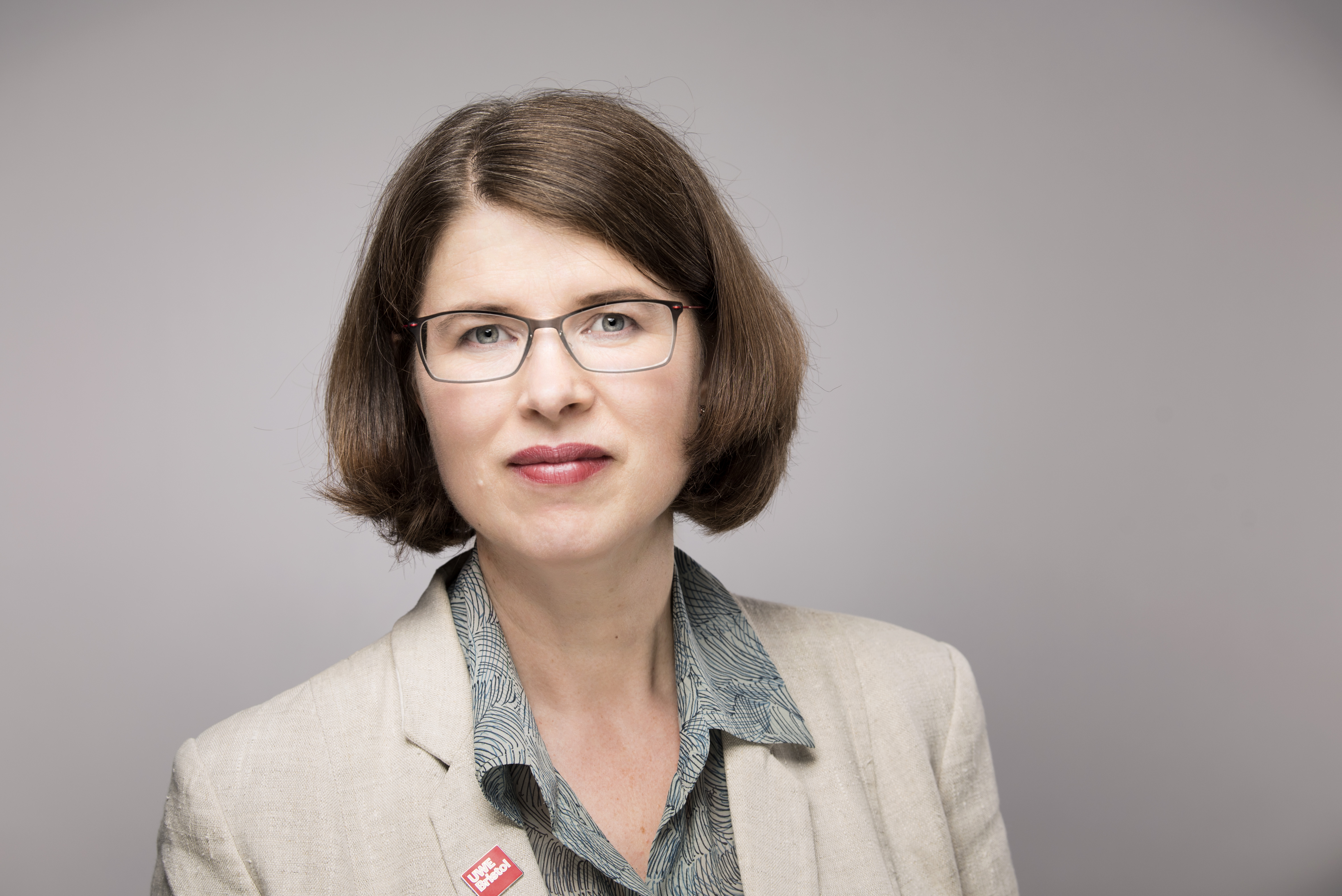
- Born: Catherine Ann Hobbs; 1968 (age 57–58); Bristol, UK
- Education: University of Warwick (BSc Mathematics); University of Liverpool (PhD)
- Scientific career
- Fields: Mathematics; Singularity theory
- Thesis: On Kinematic Singularities of Low Dimension (1993)
- Doctoral advisor: Dr Christopher Gibson
- Website: https://pureportal.coventry.ac.uk/en/persons/catherine-hobbs

Catherine Ann Hobbs FIMA CMath (born 1968) is a British mathematician and educator working as a professor at University of Bristol. Her research focuses on applications of singularity theory to the physical sciences. She has a strong interest in science policy, particularly relating to encouraging and supporting women in STEM fields.

== Early life and education ==
Hobbs's father, David Hobbs, was an academic at the University of Exeter in mathematics education, and contributed to writing a series of influential text books for school mathematics, as part of the School Mathematics Project. These introduced many concepts of modern mathematics at school level for the first time. Her mother Rosalind Hobbs was a primary school teacher. She attended the University of Warwick 1986–1989 for her first degree, where her tutors Christopher Zeeman and Caroline Series both encouraged her to consider postgraduate study. She did a PhD 1989–1993 at the University of Liverpool supervised by Chris Gibson on applications of singularity theory in robotics.

== Career ==
Her first academic appointment was as a teaching fellow at the University of Nottingham, 1992–1994. From 1994 she was at Oxford Brookes University, first as a lecturer then senior lecturer in 1997, then head of the Department of Mathematical Sciences from 2004, and Associate Dean for Research and Knowledge Exchange from 2007. She spent a sabbatical year at the University of Auckland in 2001. In 2010 she became head of the Department of Engineering Design and Mathematics at the University of the West of England in Bristol, and then Academic Dean of the Faculty of Engineering, Environment and Computing at Coventry University. before joining the University of Bristol in 2023.

From 2014–2017 Hobbs was Chair of the Committee of Heads of Departments of Mathematical Sciences in the UK (HoDoMS).

From 2017-2025, Hobbs served as vice president of the London Mathematical Society. Hobbs is a member of the Executive Committee for the set-up phase of a new UK Academy of Mathematical Sciences. In 2023 Hobbs became the Honorary Education Secretary of the Institute of Mathematics and its Applications. In September 2023, Hobbs became the Chair of the Heilbronn Institute for Mathematical Research, succeeding Geoffrey Grimmett. Hobbs is currently on the Board of the Engineering Professors' Council.

== Research ==
Her research interests are in applications of pure mathematics to the physical sciences. She has worked in applications of geometry to robotics, numerical computation of highly oscillatory integrals and dynamical systems.

=== Selected publications ===
- Hobbs C A, Paycha S. (Eds). (2010) European Women in Mathematics: Proceedings of the 13th General Meeting, University of Cambridge, UK, 3-6 September 2007. World Scientific, Singapore ISBN 981-4277-67-3
- Hobbs C A, Osinga H M. (2008) Bifurcations of the global stable set of a planar endomorphism near a cusp singularity. International Journal of Bifurcation and Chaos in Applied Sciences and Engineering, 18 (8): 2207-2222.
- Hobbs C A, Connor J N L. (2007) Theory and numerical evaluation of oddoid and evenoid integrals: oscillatory cuspoid integrals with odd and even polynomial phase functions. Journal of Computational and Applied Mathematics, 207: 192-213.
- Connor J N L, Hobbs C A. (2004) Numerical Evaluation of Cuspoid and Bessoid Oscillating Integrals for Applications in Chemical Physics. Russian Journal of Physical Chemistry, 23 (2): 13-19.
- Hobbs C A, Kirk N P. (2001) On the Classification and Bifurcation of Multigerms of Mappings from the Plane to Space. Mathematica Scandinavica. 89: 57-96.
- Kirk N P, Connor J N L, Curtis P R, Hobbs C A. (2000) Theory of axially symmetric cusped focusing: numerical evaluation of a bessoid integral by an adaptive contour algorithm. Journal of Physics A: Mathematical and General. 33: 4797-4808.
- Kirk N P, Connor J N L, Hobbs C A. (2000) An adaptive contour code for the numerical evaluation of the oscillatory cuspoid canonical integrals and their derivatives. Computational Physics Communications. 132: 142-165.
- Hobbs C A, Fainsilber L (Eds). (1999) European Women in Mathematics: Proceedings of the eighth general meeting, ICTP, Trieste 12–17 December 1997. Hindawi Publishing Corporation, Singapore ISBN 977-5945-00-3
- Gibson C G, Hobbs C A, Marar W L. (1997) On Versal Unfoldings of Singularities for General Two-dimensional Spatial Motions. Acta Applicandae Mathematicae. 47: 221-242.
- Gibson C G, Hobbs C A. (1996) Singularities of General Two-Dimensional Motions of the Plane. New Zealand Journal of Mathematics. 25: 141-163.
- Gibson C G, Hobbs C A. (1995) Singularities of general one-dimensional Motions of the Plane and Space. Proceedings of the Royal Society of Edinburgh. 125A: 639-656.
- Gibson C G, Hawes W, Hobbs C A. (1994) Local Pictures for General Two-parameter Planar Motions. Advances in Robot Kinematics and Computational Geometry 4, Kluwer Academic Publishers, 49-58.
- Gibson C G, Hobbs C A. (1993) Simple Singularities of Space Curves. Mathematical Proceedings of the Cambridge Philosophical Society. 113(2): 297-310.

== Women in STEM ==
Having been the only girl in her Further Mathematics A-level class, in a minority on her undergraduate and postgraduate courses and finding that she encountered very few women in academic positions during her studies, she became active in encouraging and supporting women to go into STEM. She has developed mentoring schemes, run outreach activities and organised conferences and lectures to provide examples of role models to younger women. From 1994 she was active in the organisation European Women in Mathematics, including being newsletter editor, editor of two proceedings of EWM conferences and a co-organiser for the 2007 EWM conference in Cambridge, UK.

She was a Member of the Government Advisory Expert Group on Women in STEM, 2009-2011, member of the National Steering Committee for the WISE Campaign (Women into Science and Engineering), 1997–2000 and a member of the European Mathematical Society's Committee for Women in Mathematics, 2004–2010. She was founding chair of the London Mathematical Society's Women in Mathematics Committee in 1999. The committee was awarded the inaugural Royal Society Athena Prize for Diversity in STEM in 2016.

=== Selected publications ===
- Why an engineering revolution is brewing
- The importance of women in STEM
- The road to equal opportunities in mathematics
- Universities must equip students for new challenges

== Additional recognition ==
Hobbs is a Principal Fellow of Advance HE (formerly the Higher Education Academy, and a 2019 National Teaching Fellow.
