= Economic problem =

Issues related to economic activities

Economic systems as a type of social system must confront and solve the three fundamental economic problems:

- What kinds and quantities of goods shall be produced? "...how much and which of alternative goods and services shall be produced?"
- How shall goods be produced? "...by whom and with what resources and in what technological manner...?"
- For whom are the goods or services produced? Who benefits? "...how is the total of national product to be distributed among different individuals and families?"

Economic systems attempt to solve these problems in several ways: "...by custom and instinct; by command and centralized control (in planned economies)" and in mixed economies using "...both market signals and government directives to allocate goods and resources." The latter is variously defined as an economic system blending elements of a market economy with elements of a planned economy, free markets with state interventionism, or private enterprise with public enterprise.

Paul Samuelson wrote in Economics, a "canonical textbook" of mainstream economic thought that "the price mechanism, working through supply and demand in competitive markets, operates to (simultaneously) answer the three fundamental problems in a mixed private enterprise system..." At competitive equilibrium, the value society places on a good is equivalent to the value of the resources given up to produce it (marginal benefit equals marginal cost). This ensures allocative efficiency — the additional value society places on another unit of the good is equal to what society must give up in resources to produce it.

The solution to these problems is important as according to Keynes in Essays of Persuasion, "...the economic problem, the struggle for subsistence, always has been hitherto the primary, most pressing problem of the human race—not only of the human race, but of the whole of the biological kingdom from the beginnings of life in its most primitive forms."

== Parts of the problem ==
The economic problem can be divided into three different parts, which are given below.

=== Problem of allocation of resources ===
The problem of allocation of resources arises due to the scarcity of resources, and refers to the question of which wants should be satisfied and which should be left unsatisfied. In other words, what to produce and how much to produce. More production of a good implies more resources required for the production of that good, and resources are scarce. These two facts together mean that, if a society decides to increase the production of some good, it has to withdraw some resources from the production of other goods. In other words, more production of a desired product can be made possible only by reducing the quantity of resources used in the production of other goods.

The problem of allocation deals with the question of whether to produce capital goods or consumer goods. If the community decides to produce capital goods, resources must be withdrawn from the production of consumer goods. In the long run, however, [investment] in capital goods augments the production of consumer goods. Thus, both capital and consumer goods are important. The problem is determining the optimal production ratio between the two.

Resources are scarce and it is important to use them as efficiently as possible. Thus, it is essential to know if the production and distribution of national product made by an economy is maximally efficient. The production becomes efficient only if the productive resources are utilized in such a way that any reallocation does not produce more of one good without reducing the output of any other good. In other words, efficient distribution means that redistributing goods cannot make anyone better off without making someone else worse off. (See Pareto efficiency.)

The inefficiencies of production and distribution exist in all types of economies. The welfare of the people can be increased if these inefficiencies are ruled out. Some cost must be incurred to remove these inefficiencies. If the cost of removing these inefficiencies of production and distribution is more than the gain, then it is not worthwhile to remove them.َ

=== The problem of full employment of resources ===
In view of the scarce resources, the question of whether all available resources are fully utilized is an important one. A community should achieve maximum satisfaction by using the scarce resources in the best possible manner—not wasting resources or using them inefficiently. There are two types of employment of resources:

- Labour-intensive
- Capital-intensive

In capitalist economies, however, available resources are not fully used. In times of depression, many people want to work but can't find employment. It supposes that the scarce resources are not fully utilized in a capitalistic economy

=== The problem of economic growth ===
If productive capacity grows, an economy can produce progressively more goods, which raises the standard of living. The increase in productive capacity of an economy is called economic growth. There are various factors affecting economic growth. The problems of economic growth have been discussed by numerous growth models, including the Harrod-Domar model, the neoclassical growth models of Solow and Swan, and the Cambridge growth models of Kaldor and Joan Robinson. This part of the economic problem is studied in the economies of development.

== See also ==
- Full employment
- Post-scarcity
- Job guarantee
- Rivalry (economics)
- Overpopulation
- Degrowth
- Post-growth
- Poverty
