= The Economics of Imperfect Competition =

The Economics of Imperfect Competition is a 1933 book written by British economist Joan Robinson.

== Contents ==
The book discusses the views of Alfred Marshall and Arthur Cecil Pigou on competition and the theory of the firm. Marshall believed that competition was imprecise, with prices being influenced by the rise and fall of demand. He also used the analogy of trees in a forest to explain how firms grow and establish a monopoly. Pigou, on the other hand, presented a logical system where perfect competition occurs when firms produce at a level where marginal cost equals price. He explained that firms operate at less than full capacity due to falling demand curves and maximization of profits at a certain output level. Robinson highlights the limitations and simplifications made in Pigou's analysis, particularly in terms of assumptions about demand conditions and the concept of price policy in manufacturing industries.

She highlights the distinction between tool-makers and tool-users in economics. The book is presented as a box of tools for analytical economists, but it acknowledges that the direct contribution to understanding the real world is limited. The gap between the tool-makers and tool-users is recognized, as economists often provide poor or misleading information to practical individuals. However, the solution is not to abandon the tools but to refine and perfect them to better address practical needs. The importance of stating assumptions clearly is emphasized, as economists sometimes struggle to do so due to a sense of shame or a lack of knowledge of their own assumptions. She stresses the need for economists to be frank about their assumptions and to approach problems in a way that has a chance of finding answers.

== Summary ==
Structure of the book:

Book I: The Technique - This book establishes the necessary definitions and assumptions for the discussions that follow. It introduces the basic concepts and lays the groundwork for the analysis.

Book II: Monopoly Equilibrium - This book focuses on the determination of prices by a single producer operating in a monopoly setting. It examines the factors that influence the price charged by a monopolist, considering both the conditions of demand and the costs involved.

Book III: Competitive Equilibrium - This book delves into the analysis of the supply curve of a commodity based on the results obtained in the previous book. It introduces a new element by considering the impact of monopoly profit on the number of producers in the industry. It also explores the effect of changes in demand on individual sellers' costs and analyzes the supply curve of a commodity under perfect competition.

Book IV: The Comparison of Monopoly and Competitive Output - This book compares the output of a perfectly competitive industry with that of a monopoly when the number of independent producers is reduced to one. It explores the differences in output levels and examines the control of monopoly price. The book also addresses objections to these comparisons, highlighting their limitations and unrealistic assumptions.

Book V: Price Discrimination - This book explores the practice of price discrimination, where a single firm charges different prices for the same commodity. It discusses the concept of price discrimination and raises reflections on its desirability.

Book VI: Monopsony - This book shifts the focus to the perspective of an individual buyer. It analyzes prices from the point of view of a monopsonist, a single buyer facing multiple sellers. It introduces definitions and considerations related to the buyer's position and examines the relationship between monopoly, monopsony, and perfect competition.

Book VII: The Demand for a Factor of Production - This book deals with the demand curve for a factor of production, specifically labor. It explores the demand for labor from the perspective of an individual employer and analyzes the demand for labor at the industry level. The analysis parallels the earlier discussions on the supply curve of a commodity.

Book VIII: The Comparison of Monopoly and Competitive Demand for Labor - This book compares the demand for labor under monopoly and perfect competition, similar to the comparisons made in Book IV for output levels. It addresses the objections and limitations of these comparisons and completes the analysis of the demand side.

Book IX: Exploitation - This book examines the prices of factors of production, shifting the perspective from the employer to the owners of the factors (such as labor). It explores the concept of exploitation and analyzes the prices of factors of production in relation to perfect competition. Ethical reflections and considerations are also introduced.

Book X: A World of Monopolies - This book moves away from the theory of value and delves into the Economics of Welfare. It connects the analysis of monopoly value with the work of Pigou on welfare economics. The book raises ethical questions and explores the implications of a world dominated by monopolies.

== Reception ==
A contemporary review from The Economic Journal in 1933 noted that the book is interesting and stimulating despite editorial limitations. The book was also reviewed in The Journal of Political Economy and Journal of the Royal Statistical Society.
