= Alexander Hill (neurologist) =

English medical doctor and professor

Alexander Hill OBE FRCS FRCP
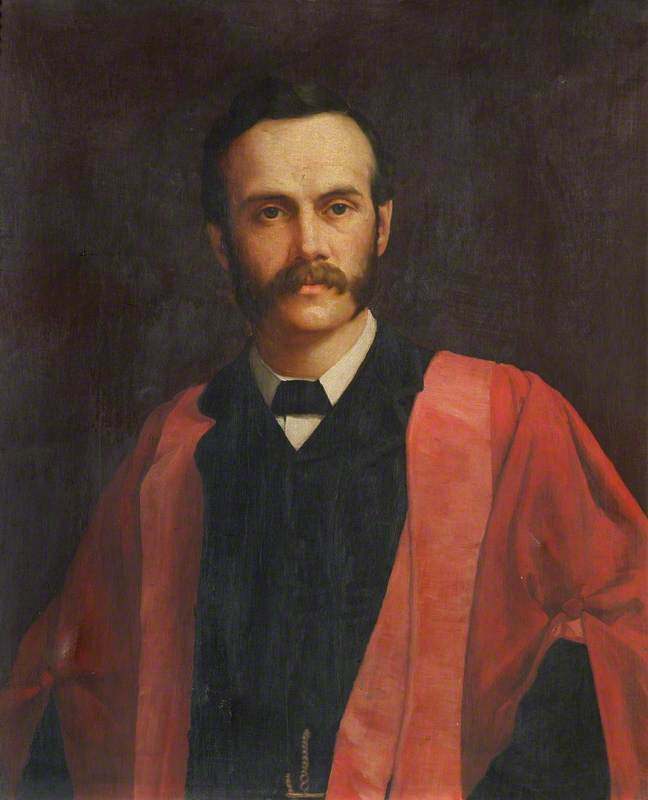
- Alexander Hill c. 1891

Principal of Southampton University College
- In office January 1913 – 1920
- Preceded by: Spencer Richardson
- Succeeded by: Thomas Tudor Loveday

Vice-Chancellor of the University of Cambridge
- In office 1897 – 1899
- Preceded by: Charles Smith
- Succeeded by: William Chawner

Master of Downing College, Cambridge
- In office 1888 – 1907
- Preceded by: William Lloyd Birkbeck
- Succeeded by: Frederick Howard Marsh

Personal details
- Born: 1856 Loughton, Essex, England
- Died: 28 February 1929 (aged 72–73) Southampton, England
- Spouse: Emma Woodward (m. 1878)
- Children: 2
- Education: University College School; Downing College, Cambridge
- Occupation: Medical doctor, professor

Alexander Hill (1856 – 28 February 1929) was a medical doctor and professor who was Master of Downing College, Cambridge from 1888 to 1907 and Vice-Chancellor of the University of Cambridge from 1897 to 1899. He was Principal of Southampton University College from 1913 to 1920.

A brain specialist, he was the first person to use the term 'neuron' in English to describe the nerve cell and its processes, in his 1891 translation of a German paper summarizing the lectures of Heinrich Wilhelm Gottfried von Waldeyer-Hartz.

== Early life ==
Hill was born at Loughton, Essex, England, the son of John Hill, a trader on the London Stock Exchange.

He attended University College School in London and then Downing College, Cambridge, matriculating in 1874, gaining a scholarship, taking first-class honours in the Natural Sciences Tripos in 1877, graduating B.A. 1878, M.A. 1881, M.B. 1882, M.D. 1886. He completed his medical training at St Bartholomew's Hospital.

== Career ==
Elected a Fellow of Downing College in 1880, Hill lectured on the histology and anatomy of the brain. He was Hunterian Professor at the Royal College of Surgeons from 1884 to 1885. He was Master of Downing College from 1888 to 1907 and Vice-Chancellor of the university from 1897 to 1899. As Vice-Chancellor, he startled some critics by inviting the actor Sir Henry Irving to deliver the Rede Lecture in 1898. Irving was awarded an honorary Litt.D., prompting one Cambridge graduate to request that the Vice-Chancellor erase his name from the university register.

Elected a member of The Physiological Society in 1885, Hill was also a founding member of the Neurological Society of London in 1886, serving as the society's President in 1896. He was appointed FRCS in 1907.

=== University College Southampton ===
Hill was appointed a commissioner for the Treasury in 1901 to report on universities and colleges. In 1902 he carried out an inspection of Southampton University College for the University Commission with a colleague, with a further inspection in 1907. This followed the Education Act 1902. The commissioners found insufficient money for local student accommodation; poor entry criteria which were well below normal university entry standards; teaching not up to university standard; and poor buildings not up to university teaching standards. With the threat of failing to continue with university college status, the financial situation was improved with local money from Southampton Borough Council and Hampshire County Council. Although in retirement, and with some hesitation, Hill was persuaded to undertake the rallying of a badly shaken college and building it into a university. In 1912 Hill accepted the position of Principal and took office in January 1913.

In a short period Hill changed the whole situation and won the confidence of staff, students and college council. New appointments and expansion into new fields followed, including Economics backed with an external London University BSc, Pharmaceuticals, Civil and Mechanical Engineering and also Architecture and building. For improved accommodation a lease was taken out on Highfield Hall, a former country house overlooking Southampton Common, but only for a limited number of staff and students. Hill and his family also occupied a house on the site.

In spring 1914, plans were made for a larger Hall of Residence. In early summer an arts block with 28 large and many smaller lecture rooms and a connecting block for biology, chemistry, physics and engineering opened on 20 June. Then, eight days later, the First World War began, with profound implications for the future of the university. The war prevented the move from Hartley College to Highfield campus for five years and disrupted Hill's plans. The new buildings were given over to the War Office for use as a hospital, as was Highfield Hall for the Red Cross. During the war Hill acted as Medical Officer to the Red Cross hospital and made channel crossings on hospital ships tending to the wounded. Student numbers and finances suffered severely. It was 1919–1920 when the War Office had finally moved out and the new buildings could be occupied at last and Highfield Hall re-occupied and the move to the Highfield campus made, after which Hill resigned.

== Personal life ==
In 1878 he married Emma Woodward and they had a son and daughter. He died at Southampton; his wife survived him.

== See also ==
- List of University of Southampton people

Academic offices
Preceded by William Lloyd Birkbeck	Master of Downing College, Cambridge; 1888-1907	Succeeded by Frederick Howard Marsh
Preceded by Charles Smith	Vice-Chancellor of the University of Cambridge; 1897-1899	Succeeded by William Chawner
Preceded by Spencer Richardson	Principal of Southampton University College; 1913 - 1920	Succeeded by Thomas Tudor Loveday
