= William Lloyd Birkbeck =

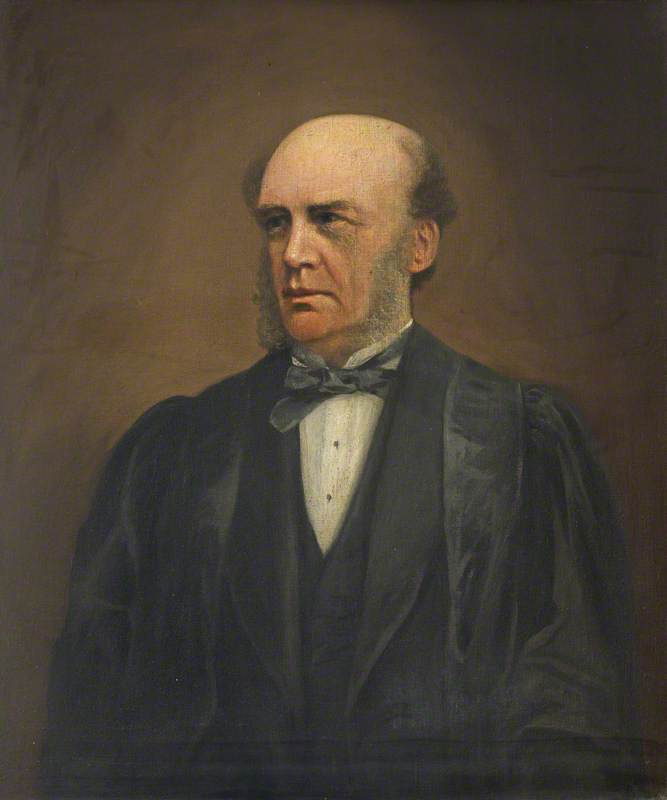
William Lloyd Birkbeck

William Lloyd Birkbeck QC (27 March 1806 – 25 May 1888) was an English legal scholar at the University of Cambridge, who served as Downing Professor of the Laws of England from 1860 and as Master of Downing College, Cambridge 1885–1888.

The son of George Birkbeck, the founder of the London Mechanics' Institute (now Birkbeck, University of London), William Lloyd Birkbeck was born in London, and educated at Charterhouse School and Trinity College, Cambridge (matriculated Michaelmas 1826, scholar 1828, graduated B.A. as 9th wrangler in 1830, proceeded M.A. in 1833).

Appointed to a Fellowship at Trinity and admitted to the Inner Temple in 1830, Birkbeck was called to the bar in 1833. Upon the death of his father George Birkbeck in 1841, Birkbeck succeeded him as President of the London Mechanics' Institute (renamed the Birkbeck Literary and Scientific Institution in 1866).

Birkbeck held the following academic positions:

- President of the Birkbeck Literary and Scientific Institution, London, 1841–88
- Reader in Equity to the Council of Legal Education, London, 1854–73
- Downing Professor of the Laws of England, Cambridge, 1860–88
- Examiner in Civil Law, Cambridge, 1873–74
- Master of Downing College, Cambridge, 1885–88

Birkbeck was appointed Queen's Counsel in 1886. He died on 25 May 1888, aged 82, at Downing College, Cambridge, and was buried in the family tomb at Kensal Green Cemetery.

Academic offices
Preceded by Thomas Worsley	Master of Downing College, Cambridge; 1885–1888	Succeeded by Alexander Hill
