= Fry Building =

Historic building of University of Bristol in England

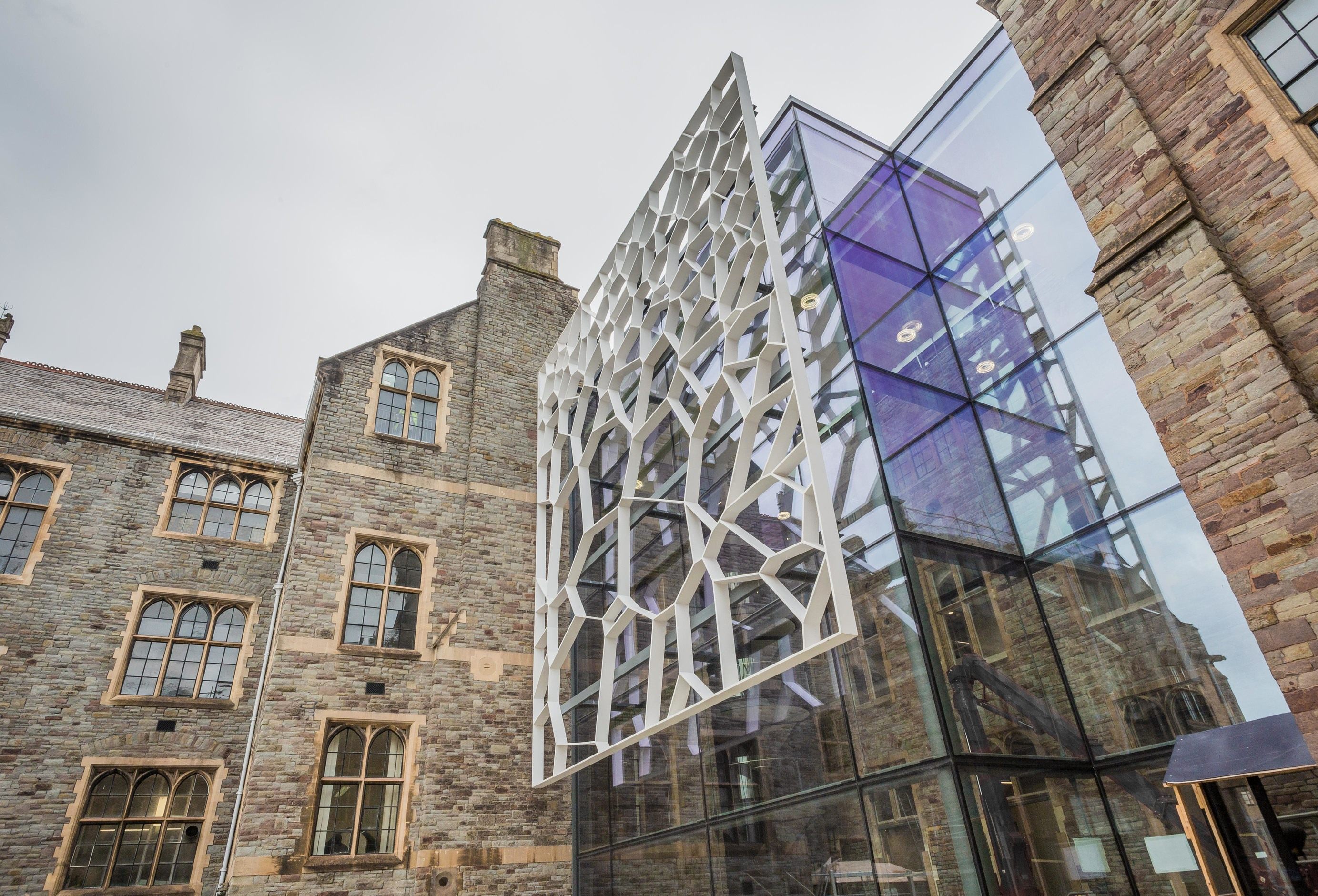
- Voronoi Sculpture on the Fry Building

- Location within Bristol
- 51.4569°N 2.6038°W
- Location: Bristol, England

Site notes
- Architect: George Oatley
- Owner: University of Bristol

Listed Building – Grade II
- Official name: University of Bristol, School of Mathematics
- Designated: 4 March 1977
- Reference no.: 1220433

The Fry Building of the University of Bristol is a Grade II listed building built in 1909 by Sir George Oatley.

In September 2019, staff and postgraduate students moved into the refurbished building ahead of the start of term.

== History ==
The building is named for the Fry family who donated land and funds to the university at its founding in 1909, when Lewis Fry was Chairman of the College Council. The Fry family was prominent in England, especially Bristol, in the Society of Friends, and as J. S. Fry & Sons in the confectionery business in the 18th, 19th, and early 20th centuries. They intermarried with many of the other prominent Quaker families and were involved in business and social and philanthropic causes.

The original section of the building was constructed in 1880, designed by architect Charles Francis Hansom. In 1909 Sir George Oatley was appointed to design a new university department for Chemistry and Physiology, further extending the Fry Building to the southwest.

The building was used for the School of Biological Sciences until 2014.

On 6 January 2018, while £33 million building work was underway to convert it into a new mathematics department, the building caught fire. Avon Fire and Rescue Service responded with a turntable ladder and multiple fire engines. A helicopter was used to illuminate the area.

The cause of fire was investigated and labelled accidental by the fire and rescue service.

Staff and students of the School of Mathematics moved into the building in September 2019.

== Architecture ==
The majority of the building is Grade II listed and constructed of pennant stone with limestone dressings and slate roof. The exterior is "architecturally ornate", including lead light windows and a decorative castellated parapet.

== Public art ==
Public art in the form of a Voronoi pattern acts as a brise soleil on the new glass facade overlooking Wills Memorial Building. This screen encloses what were originally external walls.

Outside, the design of the paving layout draws on the work of the Nobel Prize-winning Bristol-born mathematician Paul Dirac (1902–1984). Dirac notation is also present as a pattern on the internal glazing throughout the building.
