= Joan Robinson's growth model =

Joan Robinson's Growth Model is a simple model of economic growth, reflecting the working of a pure capitalist economy, expounded by Joan Robinson in her 1956 book The Accumulation of Capital. However, The Accumulation of Capital was a terse book. In a later book, Essays in the theory of Economic Growth, she tried to lower the degree of abstraction. Robinson presented her growth model in verbal terms. A mathematical formalization was later provided by Kenneth K. Kurihara.

Assumptions:

1. There is a laissez-faire closed economy.
2. The factors of production are capital and labour only.
3. There is neutral technical progress.
4. There are only two classes: workers and capitalists, among whom the national income is distributed.
5. Workers save nothing and spend their wage income on consumption.
6. Capitalists consume nothing, but save and invest their entire income for capital formation.
7. There is no change in the price level.
8. Saving is a function of profit.

== The model ==
The entrepreneurs’ total profit and the workers’ total wage bill constitute the net national income. It can be mathematically expressed as

$$p Y = w N +\pi p K$$

where Y is the net national income, w is the money wage rate, N is the number of workers employed, K is the amount of capital utilized, p is the average price of output as well as of capital and π is the gross profit rate.The above equation indicates that the profit rate is a functional of labour productivity (Y/N) and real wage rate (w/p)and capital/labor ratio

$$\pi = \frac{\frac{Y}{N} - \frac{w}{p}}{K/N}$$

Net investment

$$p\Delta K = I - \delta pK$$

where $I$ is gross investment, and $\delta$ is the rate of capital depreciation.

Investment equals savings. Since workers consume all of their wage income and capitalists save/invest all of their profits, $I = \pi pK$, then the rate of capital accumulation equals the net rate of profit:

$$\frac{\Delta K}{K} = \pi - \delta$$
