= Alan Bookbinder =

British journalist and administrator

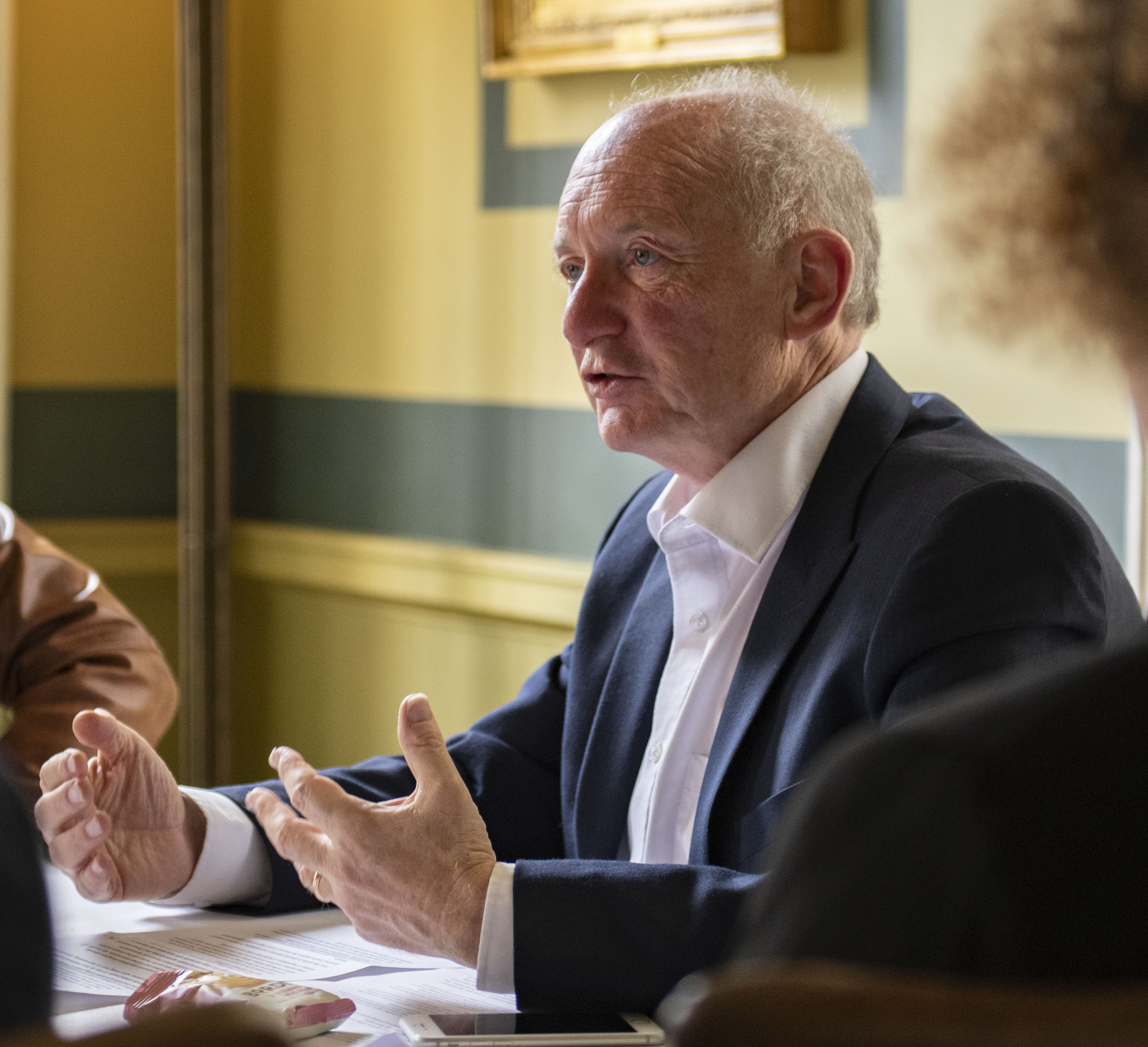
- Bookbinder in 2022

18th Master of Downing College, Cambridge
- In office 1 October 2018 – 2 October 2023
- Preceded by: Professor Geoffrey Grimmett
- Succeeded by: Graham Virgo

Personal details
- Born: Alan Peter Bookbinder; 16 March 1956 (age 70) Bristol, England
- Education: St Catherine's College, Oxford (BA); Harvard University (MA)
- Occupation: Journalist, charity executive, academic administrator

Alan Peter Bookbinder (born 16 March 1956) is a British journalist, charity executive, and academic administrator. From October 2018 to 2023, he served as Master of Downing College, Cambridge. He previously worked for the BBC, and was Director of the Sainsbury Family Charitable Trusts from 2006 to 2018.

== Biography ==
Bookbinder was born on 16 March 1956 in Bristol, England, the eldest of his parents' three sons. Geoffrey Ellis Bookbinder (1927–1990), his father, was a senior psychologist who worked for the British prisons service. His mother, born Bridget Mary Doran (1930–2009), was originally from Manchester. It was in Manchester that Alan Bookbinder spent most of his boyhood, and where he attended Manchester Grammar School, an all-boys direct grant grammar school. He studied history and Russian at St Catherine's College, Oxford, graduating in 1978 with a Bachelor of Arts (BA) degree. His university course included a year abroad, spent at Voronezh in the Soviet Union, some 300 miles south of Moscow. He subsequently received a Master of Arts (MA) degree from Harvard University, having spent a year at the Russian Research Center on a Harkness Fellowship.

He was a journalist and producer at the BBC from 1986 to 2006 where, despite describing himself as "an open-hearted agnostic", he became Head of Religion and Ethics programming (2001–2006). He was then Director of the Sainsbury Family Charitable Trusts (2006–2018), the largest family philanthropic body in the United Kingdom.

In November 2017, Bookbinder was announced as the next Master of Downing College, Cambridge, in succession to Geoffrey Grimmett. On 1 October 2018, he was installed as the 18th Master of Downing College. He was succeeded as Master by Graham Virgo in October 2023.
