= Albert Seward =

British botanist and geologist

Albert Charles Seward
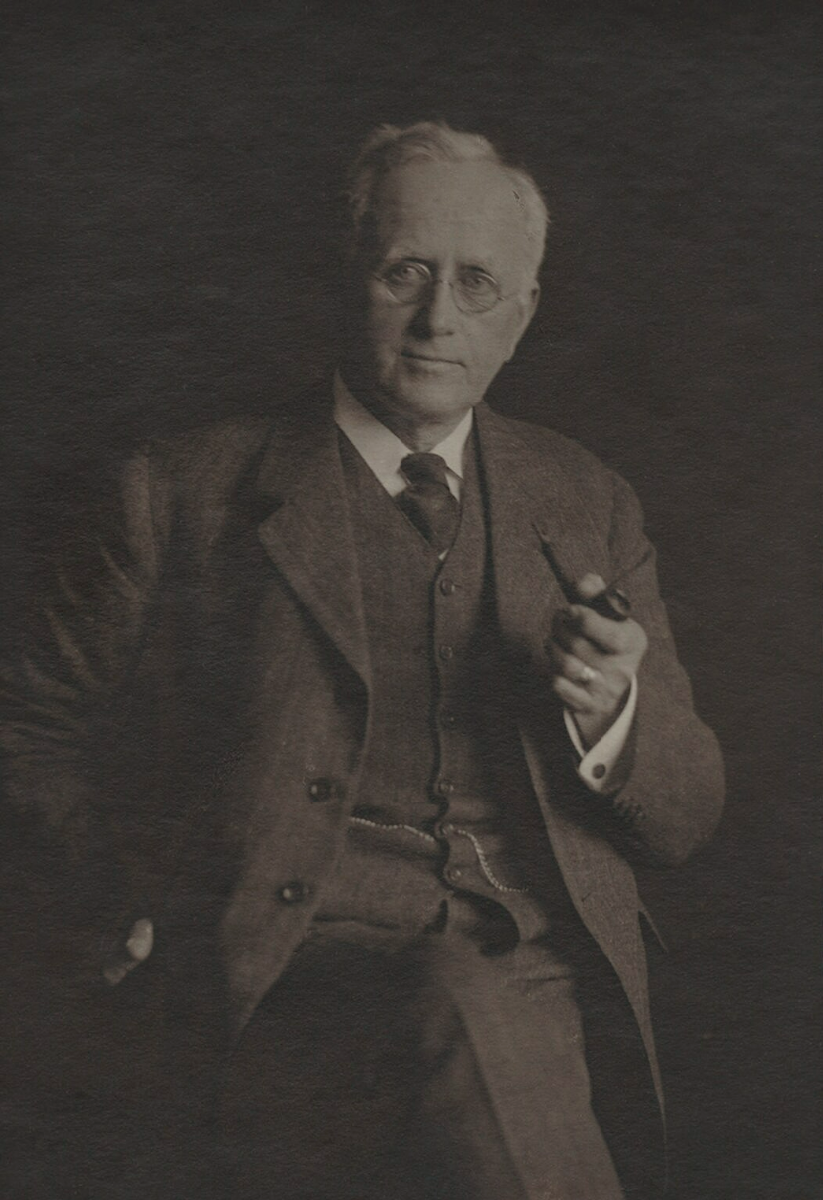
- Born: 9 October 1863; Lancaster, Lancashire, England
- Died: 11 April 1941 (aged 77); Oxford

Sir Albert Charles Seward FRS (9 October 1863 – 11 April 1941) was a British botanist and geologist.

== Life ==
Seward was born in Lancaster. His first education was at Lancaster Grammar School and he then went on to St John's College, Cambridge, intending to fulfil parents' wish that he would dedicate his life to the Church. His boyhood interest in botany and zoology soon resurfaced, helped along by inspiring lectures from William Crawford Williamson. His aptitude soon became apparent and he was appointed lecturer in botany at Cambridge University in 1890, later becoming a tutor at Emmanuel, and still later succeeding Harry Marshall Ward as Professor of Botany, Cambridge University from 1906 to 1936. He became Master of Downing College in 1915 and subsequently became Vice-Chancellor.

He was a founding member of the University of Cambridge Eugenics Society, eventually becoming its Chairman. He was joint editor (with Francis Darwin) of More letters of Charles Darwin (1903).

He was elected as fellow of the Royal Society in 1898 and was awarded the Murchison Medal of the Geological Society of London in 1908. Seward's studies of Mesozoic palaeobotany earned him membership of the Royal Society at the youthful age of thirty-five. He devoted a great deal of time to education, both as college and departmental administrator, and as writer on educational matters. In 1934 he was awarded the Darwin Medal.

In 1931 Seward dismissed the notion of a biological origin of stromatolites. At the time, this was for the most part correct. Many of the objects called stromatolites in Seward's era were inorganic in origin and misinterpreted as biologic in origin. However, Seward's claim that all stromatolites were inorganic was later shown to be incorrect, and may have delayed scientific understanding of stromatolites.

His interest in plants went beyond the living and the fossil. In 1935 he published a study on the floral carvings in the chapter house of Southwell Minster.

This botanist is denoted by the author abbreviation Seward when citing a botanical name.

Seward died in Oxford, aged 77.

== Family ==
His daughter Dorothy married his prize pupil, John Walton (son of the artist Edward Arthur Walton), who later became Professor of Botany at Glasgow University.

== Timeline ==
- 1885-86 First class honours at Cambridge University
- 1886 Embarks on a career in palaeobotany
- 1890-1906 Lecturer in botany at Cambridge
- 1892 Sedgwick Prize for essay Fossil Plants as Tests of Climate
- 1894-95 Publication of "The Wealden Flora", 2 vols
- 1898 Fellow of the Royal Society of London
- 1898-1919 Publication of "Fossil Plants", 4 vols
- 1900-1904 Publication of "The Jurassic Flora", 2 vols
- 1906-36 Professor of botany at Cambridge
- 1908 Murchison Medal of the Geological Society of London
- 1909 Publication of "Darwin and Modern Science" - Essays edited by A. C. Seward
- 1915-36 Master of Downing College, Cambridge
- 1922-24 President of the Geological Society of London
- 1924-26 Vice-Chancellor of Cambridge
- 1925 Royal Medal of the Royal Society
- 1930 President of the Fifth International Botanical Congress
- 1930 Wollaston Medal of the Geological Society
- 1931 President of the International Union of Biological Sciences
- 1931 Publication of "Plant Life Through the Ages"
- 1934 Darwin Medal of the Royal Society
- 1936 Knighthood conferred
- 1939 President of the British Association for the Advancement of Science

== Selected publications ==
- Fossil Floras of Cape Colony (1903)
- More Letters of Charles Darwin (Volume 1, Volume 2, 1903) [with Francis Darwin]
- Darwin and Modern Science (1909)
- Links With the Past in the Plant World (1911)
- Science and the Nation (1917)
- Plant Life Through the Ages (1933)
- Geology for Everyman (1943); Seward, Albert Charles (9 June 2011). 2011 pbk edition. Cambridge University Press. ISBN 978-0-521-23897-7.

Academic offices
Preceded by Frederick Howard Marsh	Master of Downing College, Cambridge; 1915–1936	Succeeded by Herbert William Richmond
