= Geoffrey Grimmett =

English mathematician (born 1950)

Geoffrey Grimmett FRS OLY
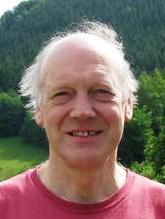
- Born: Geoffrey Richard Grimmett; 20 December 1950 (age 75); Birmingham, England, UK
- Education: Merton College, Oxford (BA, DPhil)
- Spouse: Rosine Bonay (m. 1986)
- Children: Hugo Grimmett
- Awards: DSc (Oxon) (2010); ScD (Cantab) (2010); Rollo Davidson Prize (1989)
- Scientific career
- Fields: Probability; Statistical Mechanics; Random graphs; Random fields
- Workplaces: University of Cambridge; University of Oxford; University of Bristol
- Thesis: Random Fields and Random Graphs (1974)
- Doctoral advisor: John Hammersley; Dominic Welsh
- Website: www.statslab.cam.ac.uk/~grg

Geoffrey Richard Grimmett (born 20 December 1950) is an English mathematician known for his work on the mathematics of random systems arising in probability theory and statistical mechanics, especially percolation theory and the contact process. He is the Professor of Mathematical Statistics in the Statistical Laboratory, University of Cambridge, and was the Master of Downing College, Cambridge, from 2013 to 2018.

== Education ==
Grimmett was educated at King Edward's School, Birmingham and Merton College, Oxford. He graduated in 1971, and completed his DPhil in 1974 under the supervision of John Hammersley and Dominic Welsh.

== Career and research ==
Grimmett served as the IBM Research Fellow at New College, Oxford, from 1974 to 1976 before moving to the University of Bristol. He was appointed Professor of Mathematical Statistics at the University of Cambridge in 1992, becoming a fellow of Churchill College, Cambridge. He was Director of the Statistical Laboratory from 1994 to 2000, Head of the Department of Pure Mathematics and Mathematical Statistics (DPMMS) from 2002 to 2007, and is a trustee of the Rollo Davidson Prize.

Grimmett is particularly recognised for his achievements in the rigorous theory of disordered physical systems. Especially influential is his work on and around percolation theory, the contact model for stochastic spatial epidemics, and the random-cluster model, a class that includes the Ising/Potts models of ferromagnetism. His monograph on percolation is a standard work in a core area of probability, and is widely cited. His breadth within probability is emphasized by his important contributions to probabilistic combinatorics and probabilistic number theory.

In October 2013 he was appointed Master of Downing College, Cambridge, succeeding Barry Everitt. He ended his term as Master on 30 September 2018, being replaced by Alan Bookbinder.

He was appointed Chair of the Heilbronn Institute for Mathematical Research in September 2020. He was succeeded by Catherine Hobbs on September 1 2023.

== Awards and honours ==
Grimmett was awarded the Rollo Davidson Prize in 1989 and elected a Fellow of the Royal Society (FRS) in 2014.

== Personal life ==
Grimmett is the son of Benjamin J Grimmett and Patricia W (Lewis) Grimmett.

He competed at the 1976 Summer Olympics in Montreal as a member of the Great Britain Men's Foil Team, finishing 6th.

Academic offices
Preceded by Barry Everitt	Master of Downing College, Cambridge; 2013–2018	Succeeded by Alan Bookbinder
