= Barry Everitt (scientist) =

British neuroscientist

Barry Everitt FRS FMedSci
- Born: Barry John Everitt; 19 February 1946 (age 80)
- Education: University of Hull; University of Birmingham
- Awards: Fellow of the Royal Society; FMedSci
- Scientific career
- Fields: Neuroscience
- Workplaces: University of Cambridge; University of Hull; University of Birmingham; Karolinska Institute
- Thesis: The adrenal glands and sexual behaviour in female rhesus monkeys (1971)
- Website: www.neuroscience.cam.ac.uk/directory/profile.php?bje10 psychol.cam.ac.uk/people/bje10@cam.ac.uk

Barry John Everitt (born 19 February 1946) is a British neuroscientist and academic. He was Master of Downing College, Cambridge (2003–2013), and Professor of Behavioural Neuroscience at the University of Cambridge (1997–2013). He is now emeritus professor. From 2013 to 2022, he was provost of the Gates Cambridge Trust at Cambridge University.

== Early life and education ==
Everitt was born on 19 February 1946. He graduated in zoology and psychology at the University of Hull and received his PhD degree from the University of Birmingham on behavioural neuroendocrinology. He undertook post-doctoral research at Birmingham and then at the Karolinska Institute in Stockholm, with the neuroanatomists Tomas Hökfelt and Kjell Fuxe.

== Research ==
Everitt's research has spanned many aspects of brain function, from neuroanatomy to neuroendocrinology and behavioural neuroscience. He is a behavioural neuroscientist who has combined learning theory with the methodology of systems neuroscience to uncover the neural basis of motivated behaviour. In foundational work he showed the importance of the amygdala in appetitive emotional learning and detailed the functional organization of amygdala-striatal circuitry in mediating conditioned reinforcement. Applying insights from his empirical work to addictive behaviours, he showed, in collaboration with Trevor Robbins, that drug addiction involves a transition from goal-directed control, that subsumes voluntary or recreational drug use, to habitual drug seeking that becomes compulsive. This insight led him to refine our understanding of ventral and dorsal striatal mechanisms in mediating the balance between goal-directed and habitual drug seeking, as well as detail the influence drug-associated (conditioned) cues exert on drug seeking habits and relapse. He also marshalled evidence that impairments in ‘top-down’, prefrontal inhibitory, control are a key contributory mechanism in the emergence of compulsive drug seeking in the face of adverse outcomes. A growing body of human data, including neuroimaging findings, has vindicated this neural systems account of addictive behaviour. His more recent research addressing aetiological factors, including individual differences, has revealed, with David Belin, that impulsivity acts as a vulnerability trait for compulsive cocaine seeking, leading to the characterisation of an addiction endophenotype. His discovery that addictive drug memories, potent precipitants of abstinence relapse, are vulnerable to disruption through prevention of their reconsolidation opens a novel and translatable therapeutic avenue for prevention of relapse. He is in the top 1% most cited researchers in behavioural neuroscience.

Everitt was appointed to the Department of Anatomy at the University of Cambridge in 1974, became a Fellow of Downing College in 1976 and was a Director of Studies in Medicine for the College from 1979 to 1999. In 1994 he was appointed a Reader in the Department of Experimental Psychology and in 1997 was elected Professor of Behavioural Neuroscience.

== Awards and honours ==
He has served on several national and international advisory committees and has been president of the British Association for Psychopharmacology, the European Brain and Behaviour Society and the European Behavioural Pharmacology Society. He served as President of the Federation of European Neuroscience Societies (FENS) from 2016 to 2018. He is an elected Fellow of the Royal Society, Fellow of the Academy of Medical Sciences, member of the European Molecular Biology Organisation, and received honorary D.Sc. degrees from his almae matres, Birmingham University and Hull University. In 2015 he was awarded the degree of honorary Doctor of Medicine (MDhc) by the Karolinska Institutet in Stockholm. Everitt has been editor-in-chief of the European Journal of Neuroscience and is a reviewing editor for Science. He has received the American Psychological Association "Distinguished Scientific Contribution Award" (2011), the European Behavioural Pharmacology Society "Distinguished Achievement Award" (2011), the Federation of European Neuroscience Societies European Journal of Neuroscience (FENS-EJN) Award (2012), the British Association of Psychopharmacology Lifetime Achievement Award (2012), and the Fondation Ipsen Neuronal Plasticity Prize (2014).. In 2021, he was awarded the Croonian Medal and Lecture, the Royal Society's premier award and lecture in the biological sciences. He was elected Fellow of the American Association for the Advancement of Science in 2022.In October 2019 he began what became a 2-year term as President of the Society for Neuroscience, the first President to be elected from outside North America in its 50 year history, at the beginning of the Society's 50th anniversary year..

== See also ==
- DrugScience

Academic offices
Preceded by Stephen Fleet	Master of Downing College, Cambridge; 2003–2013	Succeeded by Geoffrey Grimmett
