= City of Norwich School =

Sixth form and secondary school in Norfolk, England

Location
- Eaton Road; Norwich, Norfolk, NR4 6PP; England; 52.613°N 1.276°E

Information
- Type: Academy
- Motto: "Excellence in All"
- Established: 1910
- Local authority: Norfolk
- Department for Education URN: 141269 Tables
- Ofsted: Reports
- Headteacher: Joanne Philpott
- Gender: Mixed
- Age: 11 to 18
- Enrolment: 1,720 pupils
- Houses: Kelling, Blakeney, Holkham, Thornham, Winterton
- Website: http://www.cns-school.org/

The City of Norwich School, more commonly known as CNS, is a coeducational secondary school and sixth form with academy status in Norwich, England.

== History ==
In 1910, the Education Committee decided to merge the King Edward VI Middle School in Norwich with the Municipal and Presbyterian Schools for boys to create the new City of Norwich School, a boys' grammar school, which was to be built at Eaton.

=== Grammar school ===
The grammar school had around 950 boys in 1960, and around 850 in 1969 when administered by the Norwich Education Committee.

=== Comprehensive ===
It became a comprehensive in 1970 at which point its name changed to Eaton (City of Norwich) School and co-educational in 1971. Three female sixth-formers were admitted in 1972 (Hazel, Marian and Mary.) The original building is still in use today and sits alongside dedicated, modern facilities for science, mathematics, the arts and sixth form.

=== Academy ===
Previously a community school administered by Norfolk County Council, City of Norwich School converted to academy status on 1 September 2014 and is now sponsored by Ormiston Academies Trust. However the school continues to co-ordinate with Norfolk County Council for admissions.

== Admissions ==
It has over 1,300 pupils in years 7 to 11 and nearly 400 pupils in years 12 and 13. The school currently employs over 190 staff.

It is situated just west of the A146 ring road (former A47), with the A11 to the north and the A140 to the south. Eaton Golf Club is next door to the south-west.

== House system ==
The pupils from Years 7 to 11 at CNS are split into five houses named after notable coastal villages in Norfolk: Blakeney, Holkham, Kelling, Thornham and Winterton. Their house colours are Blue, Purple, Green, Yellow and Red respectively. Pupils in years 12 and 13 are not categorised into houses and instead belong as a singular community known as CNS Sixth Form.

== Notable former pupils ==
- Rebecca Grinter, academic
- Robert Green, footballer
- Adrian Ramsay, Former Co-leader of the Green Party of England and Wales
- Neil Shephard, FBA, Frank B. Baird Jr., Professor of Science, Professor of Economics and Professor of Statistics, Harvard University. Head of Department of Statistics, Harvard University.
- Peter Trudgill, linguist

=== City of Norwich School (boys' grammar school) ===
- Michael Andrews (artist)
- Sir Kenneth Blaxter, Director from 1965 to 1982 of the Rowett Research Institute, President from 1970 to 1971 of the British Society of Animal Production, from 1974 to 1975 of The Nutrition Society and from 1986 to 1988 of the Institute of Biology
- Jack Boddy MBE, general secretary from 1978 to 1982 of the National Union of Agricultural and Allied Workers
- Arthur Roy Clapham CBE, Professor of Botany from 1944 to 1969 at the University of Sheffield, President from 1967 to 1970 of the Linnean Society of London
- Christopher Dainty, Professor of Applied Physics since 2002 at the National University of Ireland, Galway, President from 1990 to 1993 of the International Commission for Optics and from 2002 to 2004 of the European Optical Society
- Melvyn Greaves, Professor of Cell Biology at the Institute of Cancer Research, and expert on haematological malignancy
- David Holbrook, writer, poet and academic
- Alan Howard, Wilkins Fellow of Downing College, Cambridge and inventor of the Cambridge diet
- Edmund Lawson, barrister
- Cecil Alec Mace, Professor of Psychology from 1944 to 1961 at Birkbeck College, and President from 1952 to 1953 of the British Psychological Society
- Bernard Matthews CBE, food executive
- Bernard Meadows, Professor of Sculpture from 1960 to 1980 at the Royal College of Art
- Adrian Newland, Professor of Haematology since 1992 at Barts and The London School of Medicine and Dentistry, President from 1998 to 1999 of the British Society for Haematology
- Thomas Piercy, clarinetist
- George Plunkett (1913–2006), photographer
- Malcolm Quantrill, distinguished professor of architecture from 1986 to 2007 at Texas A&M University
- Tony Sheridan, musician
- Jeremy C. Smith (scientist), Governor's Chair for Biophysics, University of Tennessee, since 2006
- Steve Smith (academic), Vice Chancellor, University of Exeter
- Very Rev John Southgate, Dean of York from 1984 to 1994
- Graeme K Talboys, writer – attended the school for the first two years of his secondary education
- Robert H. Thouless, President from 1949 to 1950 of the British Psychological Society who wrote Straight and Crooked Thinking in 1930
- Prof Peter Trudgill, academic and author, Professor of English Linguistics from 1998 to 2005 at the University of Fribourg (Switzerland)
- George Willis, Labour MP from 1945 to 1950 for Edinburgh North, and from 1954 to 1970 for Edinburgh East

=== King Edward VI Middle School ===
- Sir Graham Savage CB, architect of the comprehensive school system

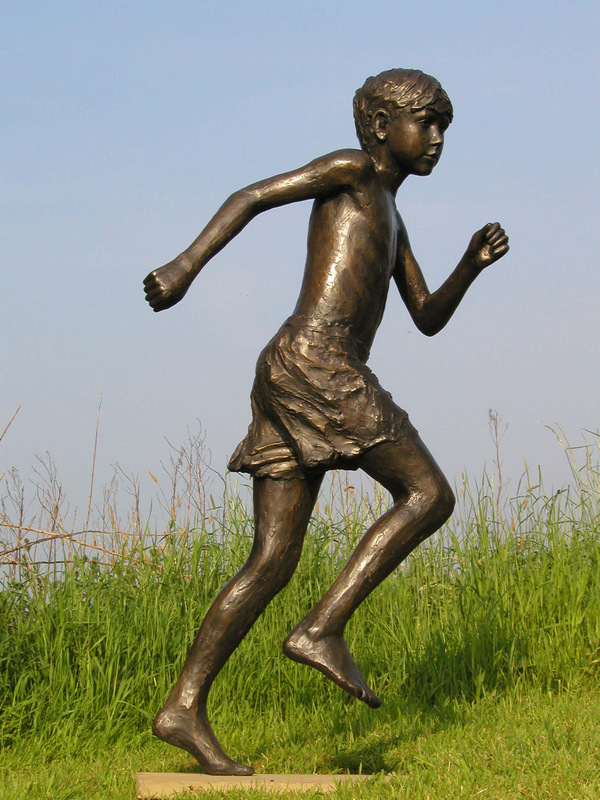
Bronze sculpture by Brian Alabaster ARBS of Tom Running at City of Norwich School
