= Alan Howard (nutritionist) =

English nutritionist (1929–2020)

Alan Norman Howard
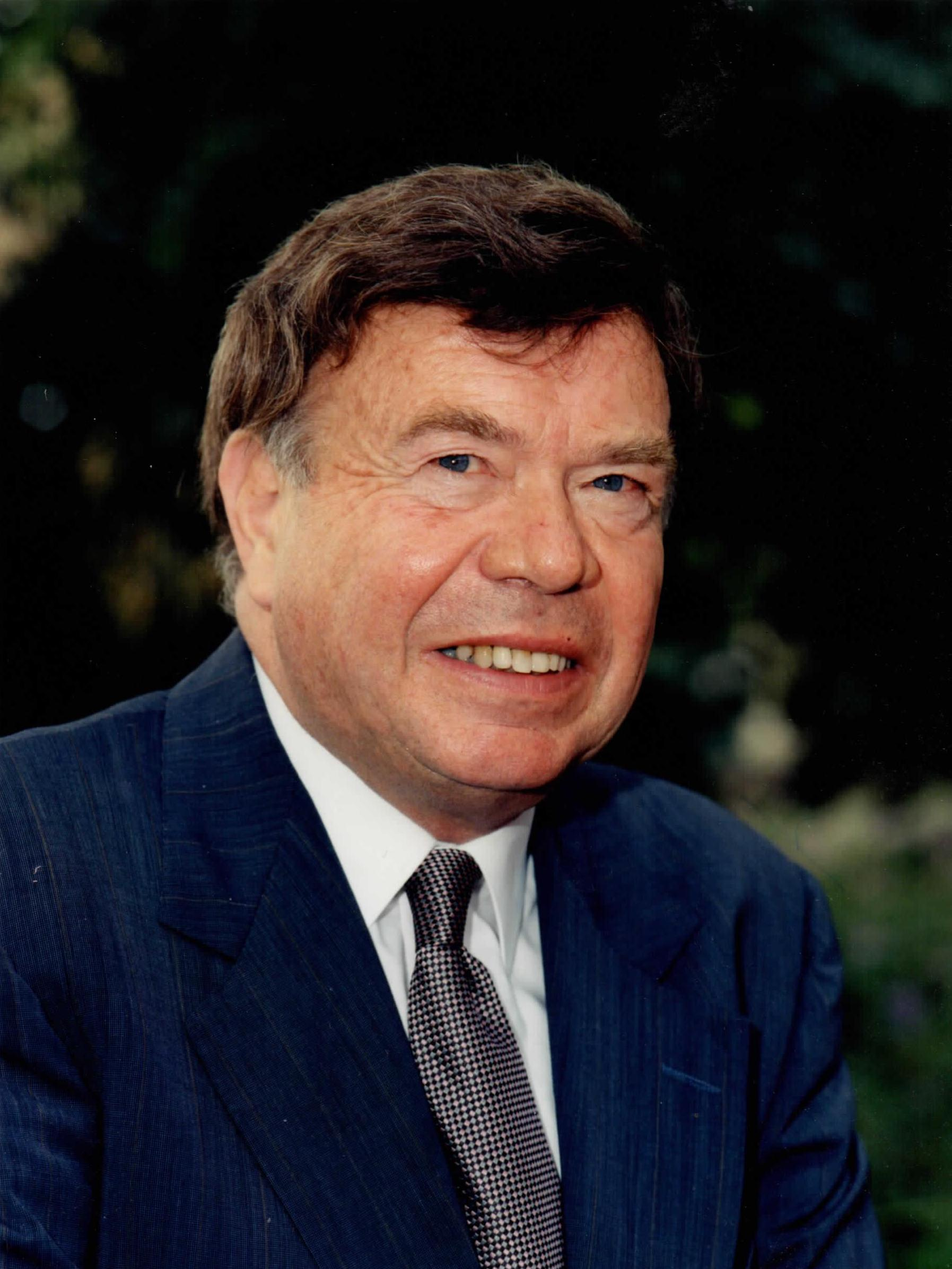
- Howard in 1999
- Born: 16 March 1929; Norwich, England
- Died: 24 June 2020 (aged 91); Cannes, France
- Education: City of Norwich School, Downing College, Cambridge
- Alma mater: Downing College, Cambridge
- Occupations: Nutritionist and Philanthropist
- Known for: The Cambridge Diet; Howard Foundation
- Spouse(s): Grace Elizabeth (née Lee) m. 1952 d. 2008; Lydia (née Bentley) m. 2008
- Children: 2
- Awards: Fellow of the Royal Society of Chemistry (FRSC) 1968; Honorary Fellowship of Downing College, Cambridge, 1987

Alan Norman Howard (16 March 1929 – 24 June 2020) was an English nutritionist. His research interests were in the field of nutrition, initially in the nutritional relationships associated with coronary heart disease and the treatment of obesity and later into eye and brain nutrition. His inventions and patents related to very-low-calorie diets enabled him to establish the Howard Foundation. He died peacefully on 24 June 2020 in his holiday home in Cannes, France.

== Education ==
Howard enrolled at Downing College, Cambridge in 1948 to read Natural Sciences. He continued his education at Downing College, gaining an MA in natural sciences and PhD in immunology in January 1955. He then trained as a nutritionist at the Medical Research Council's Dunn Nutritional Laboratory also in Cambridge.

== Academic career ==
Howard was at Cambridge University 1960–1992; the later part of this was in the Department of Medicine under Professor Ivor Mills, a Fellow of the Royal College of Physicians, and then as College Lecturer in Nutritional Research at Downing College (Cambridge University).

=== Early work on atherosclerosis ===
In the 1950s, Howard began working on experimental atherosclerosis. He continued this study while at the Department of Pathology and was secretary for the first International Symposium On Atherosclerosis held in Athens in 1966 and was an editor of the proceedings.

=== Early work on obesity ===
In 1968, Howard published results of a clinical trial on the use of a high-protein "Cambridge Formula Loaf" for treatment of obesity. He became secretary to the newly formed Obesity Association (aka The Obesity Society of Great Britain and now the Association for the Study of Obesity). Howard became secretary and later chairman of The Food Education Society from 1970 until 1990. In July 1974, Howard was invited to take part in the BBC series Don't just sit there ... with William Rushton and others. He then co-authored a book Don't just sit there.

Howard and George A. Bray (from the University of California) organised the first International Congress on Obesity (ICO) which was held at the Royal College of Physicians in London in October 1974. They were also the founding co-editors of The International Journal of Obesity which began in 1977. These early initiatives led in 1985/86 to the formation of the International Association for the Study of Obesity which since 2014 is known simply as World Obesity.

== The Cambridge Diet ==
While in the Department of Medicine at Cambridge University, Howard's team ran a "lipid clinic" at Addenbrookes Hospital between 1973 and 1980. He collaborated with Ian MacLean Baird, then a consultant at West Middlesex Hospital, to devise a low-calorie diet formula for morbidly obese patients. This was initially named "Howard's Diet". It was later marketed as The Cambridge Diet. In 1982, Howard and family members formed Cambridge Nutrition Limited in the UK. In 1985, Howard and John Marks wrote a book The Cambridge Diet – A Manual for Health Professionals. From 1985 to the late 1980s, Howard supervised the commercial marketing of the Cambridge Diet in the UK and other European countries.

== Later research ==
Howard established Howard Foundation Research (HFR) in 1986 to carry out scientific research into low-calorie diets under the direction of Dr Stephen Kreitzman. Howard resigned as director in 2000.

In 1991, Howard established the COAG Trace Elements Laboratory, based at Papworth Hospital, near Cambridge. The COAG Laboratory ran until 2000 carrying out research into aspects of nutrition and health, especially the prevention of coronary heart disease. When the laboratory closed, the equipment was transferred to the University of Ulster and the Poznan University of Medical Sciences, for the continuation of research programmes.

== Macular degeneration and carotenoids ==
In 1995, Howard started work with Richard Bone and John Landrum at Florida International University. Together they patented a dietary supplement containing meso-zeaxanthin, lutein and zeaxanthin.

In 2009, Howard began working with the Macular Pigment Research Group at the Waterford Institute of Technology in Ireland on nutrition research, initially regarding age-related macular degeneration followed by research into Alzheimer's disease. In 2019, Howard was awarded an honorary fellowship to the institute.
