= Howard Foundation (UK) =

British charitable organization

The Howard Foundation
- Founded: 1982; 44 years ago
- Founder: Dr Alan Howard
- Registration no.: 285822
- Purpose: Scientific Research and support for Downing College Cambridge University
- Location: Cambridge England
- Region served: United Kingdom and overseas
- Key people: Dr Alan Howard (Chairman); Jon Howard (Secretary); Sir Anthony Grant (former trustee); Stephen Fleet (former trustee)
- Website: www.howard-foundation.com

The Howard Foundation is a charitable trust with the aims of establishing and maintaining scientific research into nutriceuticals and in assisting the construction and maintenance of buildings at Downing College Cambridge University.

== History ==
In 1982 Dr Alan Howard, together with his son Jon, formed the Howard Foundation into which all royalties and profits from worldwide sales of the Cambridge Diet and other intellectual property rights were paid. The Foundation currently focuses on biomedical research and philanthropy. The Foundation sponsors research into human nutrition and conferences on obesity, prostate cancer, creatine, and on macular carotenoids.

== Philanthropy ==
The Foundation has made significant donations to buildings and other works at Downing College Cambridge University. In particular, the Howard Building (1986) and the Howard Lodge (1991) both designed by Quinlan Terry and the Howard Theatre designed by Quinlan and Francis Terry (2009). The Foundation sponsored the book by Tim Rawle: A Classical Adventure – the Architectural History of Downing College, Cambridge.

The Foundation also made donations to the Waterford Institute of Technology towards the construction of the Howard Laboratory (an analytical chemical laboratory) and the Howard Gate at Carriganore House, on the west campus of the Waterford Institute of Technology.

== Conferences ==
In May 2010, the Foundation sponsored a conference on "Creatine in Health, Medicine and Sport", held at Downing College, Cambridge. This was followed by the first Macular Carotenoids Conference also held at Downing College in July 2011 which led to a book, Carotenoids and Retinal Disease. Further conferences on Macular Carotenoids at Downing College were held in 2013 and 2015. The BON (Brain and Ocular Nutrition) Conference is to be held 11–13 July 2018 again at Downing College, Cambridge.

== Research ==
Since 2009 the Foundation has sponsored numerous clinical trials conducted by the Waterford Institute of Technology, and has funded numerous Fellowships, the principal bequest being a Chair in Human Nutrition funded permanently by it from October 2016, the current holder being Professor John Nolan PhD.
