= Howard Foundation =

Howard Foundation may refer to:

- Howard Foundation, started by the Howard families, a fictional group of people created by the author Robert A. Heinlein
- Howard Foundation (UK), a charitable trust aiming to establish and maintain scientific research into nutriceuticals
