= A Classical Adventure: The Architectural History of Downing College, Cambridge =

Book by Tim Rawle

- Jacket with photograph by Tim Rawle and Louis Sinclair
- Author: Tim Rawle; edited by John Adamson; with foreword by Jon Howard
- Illustrator: Tim Rawle (photographs); Louis Sinclair (photographs); Jeremy Bays (aerial perspective drawings)
- Cover artist: Tim Rawle and Louis Sinclair
- Language: English
- Release number: 1st edition
- Subject: Cambridge, history of architecture, architectural photography
- Genre: Reference
- Published: Cambridge
- Publisher: Oxbridge Portfolio
- Publication date: 10 September 2015
- Publication place: United Kingdom
- Pages: 200
- ISBN: 978-0-9572867-4-0 (Hardcover)
- OCLC: 931005141
- Website: Book's official web page

A Classical Adventure: The Architectural History of Downing College, Cambridge is a book written by Tim Rawle and first published in 2015. The book is an introduction to the architectural history of Downing College, Cambridge with photographs of the college buildings by Rawle and Louis Sinclair.

== Summary ==
Founded in 1800, through the will of Sir George Downing, 3rd Baronet, Downing College was the first major scheme in England to be built in the Neoclassical Greek Revival style, and the first college to be built in Cambridge for more than two hundred years. The architect William Wilkins won the commission to design the college but owing to a protracted legal battle instigated by the last Lady Downing, Wilkins's concept was never fully built.

Rawle's book tells the story from the beginnings of the college to the present day and shows how it has remained committed to the Neoclassical tradition in most of the later buildings erected, including the Senior Combination Room by Howell, Killick, Partridge & Amis and the Howard Theatre by Quinlan and Francis Terry.

== Critical reception ==
"Often overlooked by tourists and 'tucked away' from its more famous counterparts, Cambridge's only classical college has been brought into the spotlight, in a new book by a former student," wrote the Cambridge News. The Georgian commented, “a beautifully-illustrated and well-researched architectural history of Downing College,” and Historic House called the book, "an essential read".
