= David Holbrook =

British writer, poet and academic

David Kenneth Holbrook (9 January 1923 – 11 August 2011) was a British writer, poet and academic. From 1989 he was an Emeritus Fellow of Downing College, Cambridge.

== Life ==
David Holbrook was born in Norwich in 1923. He was educated at City of Norwich School and won a scholarship to study English at Downing College, Cambridge for a year in 1941, where he was a pupil of F. R. Leavis. He is sometimes identified as a Leavis disciple, but their relationship was slighter than this might suggest (and also ended angrily, though this is a lesser indication). Holbrook was called up for military service with the British Army in 1942 and served until 1945 as an officer with the East Riding Yeomanry. His novel Flesh Wounds (1966) is a lightly fictionalised account of his D-Day campaign experiences. In 1945 he returned to Downing to complete his degree, which he did in 1947. In 1946 he made a bleak visit to George Orwell on Jura. The actual reason was to see his girlfriend Susan Watson, who was Orwell's housekeeper, but Orwell assumed it was connected with Holbrook's membership of the Communist Party of Great Britain, and gave him a frosty reception.

After Cambridge, he became an editor with Edgell Rickword, of the communist cultural periodical Our Time. He then took up teaching positions, for the Workers' Educational Association and then at a secondary school in Bassingbourn, Cambridgeshire. He became a full-time writer in the early 1960s. He also renewed links with the University of Cambridge, becoming a Fellow of King's College, Cambridge in 1961, a Fellow of Downing College, Cambridge in 1981 and an Emeritus Fellow of Downing in 1988.

The Associated University Presses marked his seventieth birthday by publishing a Festschrift entitled Powers of Being in October 1995. The book of essays is edited by Edwin Webb, Senior Lecturer in English at the University of Greenwich, and included contributions by sixteen academics and teachers from the United Kingdom, Canada, and the United States, with a portrait written by Boris Ford.

He was a Fellow of the English Association.

== Works ==
=== Novels ===
Holbrook wrote several novels based on his own life and his family history. These were not Romans à clef—most characters were identified by their real names—but they were closely based on real events without the constraints of veracity. The novels were not written in the internal chronological order.

His first novel, Flesh Wounds (1966), told the story of the escapades of Paul Grimmer (Holbrook's fictionalised persona) as a tank officer in the Normandy invasions. The events of Grimmer's adolescent life up to his enlistment were recounted in A Play of Passion (1978), which told of his involvement with the Maddermarket Theatre and its founder Nugent Monck.

In Going Off The Rails (2003), Holbrook recreates the Edwardian lives of his paternal grandparents in rural Norfolk. His grandfather William built wagons in the Midland and Great Northern Railway workshops at Melton Constable. Holbrook's father worked as a railway booking clerk in North Walsham. He moved to Norwich when he was suspected of theft.

His other novels are Nothing Larger Than Life (1987); Worlds Apart (1988); A Little Athens (1990); Jennifer (1992); The Gold in Father's Heart (1992); Even If They Fail (1994); and Getting It Wrong With Uncle Tom (1998).

=== Poetry ===
- Imaginings. London: Putnam, 1960 (Reprinted 1961).
- Against The Cruel Frost. London: Putnam, 1963.
- Object Relations. London: Methuen & Co. Ltd., 1967.
- Old World New World. London: Rapp & Whiting, 1969. ISBN 0-85391-144-4
- Chance of a Lifetime. London: Anvil Press, 1978.
- Moments in Italy: Poems and Sketches. Richmond, England: The Keepsake Press (An edition of 280 signed and numbered copies).
- Selected Poems: 1961–1978 London: Anvil Press, 1980.

=== Criticism ===
- The Quest for Love, 1965;
- Human Hope and the Death Instinct, 1971;
- Sex and Dehumanization, 1972;
- The Masks of Hate, 1972;
- Dylan Thomas; the Code of Night, 1972;
- Gustav Mahler and the Courage to Be, 1975;
- Sylvia Plath: Poetry and Existence, 1977;
- Lost Bearings in English Poetry, 1977;
- Evolution and the Humanities, 1987;
- The Novel and Authenticity, 1987;
- Further Studies in Philosophical Anthropology, 1988;
- Images of Woman in Literature, 1990;
- The Skeleton in the Wardrobe: the Phantasies of C.S.Lewis, 1991;
- Edith Wharton and the Unsatisfactory Man, 1991;
- Where Lawrence Was Wrong About Woman, 1992;
- Charles Dickens and the Image of Woman, 1993;
- Creativity and Popular Culture, 1994;
- Tolstoy, Woman and Death, 1997;
- Wuthering Heights: A Drama of Being, 1997;
- George MacDonald and the Phantom Woman, 2000;
- Lewis Carroll: Nonsense Against Sorrow, 2000

=== Words for music ===
Holbrook worked with composer Wilfrid Mellers on a series of works:

- Mary Easter (ballad opera, 1957)
- The Borderline (opera, 1958)
- The Hedge of Flowers , masque (1960)
- Dream of the Green Man, after Ronald Johnson, masque 1980
- The Pentagle Song for mixed chorus (1981)

=== Education ===
English for Maturity (1961) is a guide for secondary school English teachers drawing on Holbrook's experience in that role at Bassingbourn.

His other books on education are English for the Rejected (1964); English in Australia Now (1964); The Exploring Word (1967); Children's Writing (1967); The Secret Places (1972); Education, Nihilism and Survival (1974); Education and Philosophical Anthropology (1987); and English for Meaning (1980).

=== List of other works ===
- Children's Games (1957)
- Imaginings (1961) poems
- Lights in the Sky Country: Mary Easter and Stories of East Anglia (1962)
- Llareggub Revisited. Dylan Thomas and the state of modern poetry (1962)
- Thieves and Angels (1962) editor, school drama
- People and Diamonds (1962) editor, school short story anthology
- Against the Cruel Frost (1963) poems
- Penguin Modern Poets 4 (1963) with Christopher Middleton and David Wevill
- English for the Rejected. Training Literacy in the Lower Streams of the Secondary School (1964)
- English in Australia Now. Notes on a visit to Victoria and other states (1964)
- The Secret Places. Essays on Imaginative Work in English Teaching and on the Culture of the Child (1964)
- Dylan Thomas and Poetic Dissociation (1964)
- The Quest for Love (1964)
- Visions of Life (1964) four volumes, editor, prose comprehension
- Iron, Honey, Gold: The Uses of Verse (1965) editor, a poetry anthology
- Childhood by Maxim Gorki (1965) abridged, Gertrude M, Foakes translator
- Object Relations (1967) poems
- The Exploring Word: Creative Disciplines in the Education of Teachers of English (1967)
- Children's Writing: a sampler for student teachers (1967)
- The Cambridge Hymnal (1967) compiler with Elizabeth Poston
- Plucking The Rushes (1968) editor
- Old World, New World (1969) poems
- Human Hope and the Death Instinct: An Exploration of Psychoanalytical Theories of Human Nature and their Implications for Culture and Education (1971)
- The Mask of Hate: The Problem of False Solutions in the Culture of an Acquisitive Society (1972)
- Sex & Dehumanization in Art, Thought, and Life in Our Time (1972)
- Dylan Thomas; the Code of Night (1972)
- The Pseudo-Revolution (1972)
- The Case Against Pornography (1973) editor
- Education, Nihilism, and Survival (1974)
- Gustav Mahler and The Courage To Be (1975)
- Sylvia Plath: Poetry and Existence (1976)
- A Play of Passion (1977) novel
- Lost Bearings in English Poetry (1977)
- Chance of a Lifetime (1978) poems
- Moments in Italy: Poems and Sketches (1978)
- A Play of Passion (1978)
- Selected Poems (1980)
- English for Meaning (1980)
- Nothing Larger Than Life (1987) novel
- Evolution and the Humanities (1987)
- The Novel and Authenticity (1987)
- Education and Philosophical Anthropology: Toward a New View of Man for the Humanities and English (1987)
- Worlds Apart (1988) novel
- Further Studies in Philosophical Anthropology (1988)
- Images of Woman in Literature (1989)
- What Is It to Be Human?: New Perspectives in Philosophy (1990)
- A Little Athens (1990) novel
- The Skeleton in the Wardrobe: C.S. Lewis's Fantasies: A Phenomenological Study (1991)
- Edith Wharton and the Unsatisfactory Man (1991)
- Where Lawrence Was Wrong About Woman (1992)
- Jennifer (1992) novel
- Charles Dickens and the Image of Woman (1993)
- The Gold In Father's Heart (1992) novel
- Creativity and Popular Culture (1994)
- Even If They Fail (1994) novel
- Tolstoy, Woman, and Death. A Study of War and Peace and Anna Karenina (1997)
- Wuthering Heights: A Drama of Being (1997)
- Getting It Wrong With Uncle Tom (1998) novel
- Bringing Everything Home (1999) poems
- A Study of George MacDonald and the Image of Women (2000)
- Lewis Carroll: Nonsense Against Sorrow

== Bibliography ==
- Holbrook, David. Flesh Wounds (London: Methuen, 1966) ISBN 978-1-86227-391-7
- Holbrook, David. A Play of Passion (London: W. H. Allen, 1978) ISBN 0-491-02282-4 Reprinted Norwich: Mousehold, 2004 ISBN 1-874739-33-1
- Holbrook, David. Going Off The Rails (London: Capella, 2003) ISBN 1-902918-14-2
