= Edmund Lawson =

Edmund James Lawson, QC (17 April 1948 – 26 March 2009) was a prominent English barrister who worked on high-profile cases.

== Personal life ==
The only son of Donald and Veronica Lawson, he was born and grew up in Norwich, but also spent several of his childhood years in Ireland. He attended City of Norwich School and, although he excelled in Latin, decided to read law at University (for want, in his words, of a "better option"). He attended Trinity Hall, Cambridge, where he participated in rugby union and punting. He graduated in 1970.

While at Cambridge, he met his first wife Jennifer Cleary, with whom he had three sons. They were divorced in 2002, and in 2003 Lawson married Christina Russell, a barrister at his chambers, with whom he already had two children (one daughter and one son) and a stepson, and this marriage produced a further two sons.

He was a keen musician, playing violin and viola, and with a penchant for the music of Bach and Mozart (as well as the earlier works of the Rolling Stones), and latterly was an active supporter and sponsor of the Nash Ensemble, the acclaimed chamber music ensemble. He was also an avid fan of rugby union, regularly attending England internationals either at Twickenham or abroad, and was also a supporter of Harlequins RFC.

In January 2009, Lawson suffered the first of a series of strokes which left him severely incapacitated, and on 26 March he died peacefully of pneumonia. He was 60.

== Career ==
Having been called to the Bar by Gray's Inn in 1971, he spent five years with a small civil set in Kings Bench Walk, before joining the (then) Chambers of Sir Arthur Irvine, QC (the former Solicitor-General), at 4 Paper Buildings. He developed a sterling reputation as a criminal barrister, with particular expertise in financial crime and fraud, and took Silk in 1988. He was appointed head of chambers in 1990, a position he held for 11 years, during which time the set moved to 9–12 Bell Yard and entrenched its reputation as a leading criminal set in the country.

In 1998 Lawson was appointed a Bencher of Gray's Inn. He sat for several years as chairman of the Inn's Continuing Education Committee, and was actively involved in the provision of advocacy and ethics training to junior barristers and pupils.

In 2006, he was one of six high-profile QCs who moved to form a new "super set", Cloth Fair Chambers (named after the historic London street in which it was located). At the time, the concept of a "Silks only" set (i.e. one with no junior barristers or pupils) was seen as a controversial move, though Cloth Fair quickly gained recognition as the leading criminal chambers in London.

== Notable trials ==
Lawson's criminal law practice saw him involved in a number of high-profile and complex trials, including:

- defending multiple murderer Jeremy Bamber (as Junior Counsel) in 1986
- defending UBS Phillips & Drew in the 'Blue Arrow' securities Fraud
- defending Ian Maxwell in the fraud trial arising from the Mirror Group Newspapers pension fund scandal
- defending police officers against charges of corruption and of perverting the course of justice during the investigations into the 'Guildford Four' and 'Birmingham Six' bombings
- defending hacker Gary McKinnon against extradition to the US to face charges of hacking into US Department of Defense computer systems
- defending Railtrack in the corporate manslaughter trial following the Hatfield rail crash
- prosecuting al-Qaeda terrorist Dhiren Barot on charges of conspiring to commit mass murder
- defending Henry Sweetbaum, former chairman and chief executive of Wickes plc, on charges of accounting fraud
- acting for the Metropolitan Police in securing the reversal of an unlawful killing verdict in the shooting of Harry Stanley

== Inquiries ==
In addition to his trial work, Lawson was involved in a number of sensitive inquiries, including:

- representing the Metropolitan Police at the inquest into the death of Diana, Princess of Wales
- representing British Army soldiers at the Saville Inquiry into the events of 'Bloody Sunday'
- acting as Counsel to the Stephen Lawrence Inquiry
- advising the Metropolitan Police at the inquiry and subsequent Inquest into the shooting of Jean-Charles de Menezes
- advising Michael Peat, private secretary to HRH The Prince of Wales, in an internal inquiry into alleged misconduct within the Prince's household
