= Evolution and the Humanities =

1987 book by David Holbrook

- Author: David Holbrook
- Subject: Evolution
- Publisher: Gower Publishing Company
- Publication date: 1987
- Pages: 228

Evolution and the Humanities is a 1987 book by David Holbrook that attacks Darwinian evolution. The book rejects reductionist biology and takes influence from Michael Polanyi and vitalist philosophy.

== Reception ==
The book has been heavily criticized by academics. Martin Stuart-Fox noted that Holbrook's criticism of natural selection was a "cobble together, in a sort of scissors-and-paste criticism... the book contains no vigorous argument at all. Not only is Holbrook very obviously no scientist, he is no philosopher either."

Ecologist Arthur M. Shapiro in a review for the National Center for Science Education commented:

David Holbrook, Fellow of Downing College, Cambridge, has written a polemic not so much against evolution as against scientific reductionism (which he sees incarnate in neo-Darwinism). He proceeds from revulsion at the existentialist vision of "life as a 'scientific accident.'" He's no creationist but, rather, a from-the-gut free-form vitalist—just as preoccupied with the perceived moral consequences of the Darwinian revolution as any Bible-thumping moralist could be. As usual, he conflates science with scientism and evolution with evolutionism, materialism, and atheism."

The book is said by Arthur M. Shapiro, among others, to have been poorly edited and contain errors such as misspellings of relevant names. The book also contains factual errors or misunderstandings.
