= Graham Savage =

British civil servant

Sir (Edward) Graham Savage CB (31 August 1886 – 18 May 1981) was an English civil servant who largely invented the concept of comprehensive schools and originated the phrase.

== Early life ==
Born in Erpingham, Savage was the son of Edward Graham Savage and Mary Matilda Dewey, teachers at the Upper Sheringham elementary (primary) school. He was the eldest in the family and had two brothers and two sisters. He attended Upper Sheringham School, King Edward VI Middle School, Norwich (merged with the Presbyterian School to become the City of Norwich School) and Downing College, Cambridge. He gained firsts in Part 1 of the Natural Science Tripos in 1905 and in Part 2 of the Historical Tripos in 1906.

== Career ==
He became a schoolteacher and later an educational administrator. He became an education officer for London County Council.

He was a tutor at Bede College, Durham then assistant master at St. Andrews College, Toronto and Tewfikieh School, Cairo. He became a lecturer at Khedivial Training College, Egypt. From 1914 to 1919 he served in the Royal West Kent Regiment in Gallipoli, becoming a captain then a major. He was injured at Ypres. After the war he was assistant master at Eton College.

He became a District Inspector for the Board of Education from 1919 to 1927, then Chief Inspector of Technical Schools and Colleges in 1932. He was a Senior Chief Inspector from 1933 to 1940, then Education Officer to the LCC from 1940 to 1951. This was during The Blitz. Labour had controlled London County Council since 1934.

=== Comprehensive schools ===
From 1925 to 1926 he visited America specifically the states of New York and Ohio, and was impressed by the democratic nature of the high schools in terms of social diversity, although overall academic performance of such schools was less well-researched; it was of secondary interest. He noted that the system did not account for the different needs of the school population, but he nonetheless liked the general nature of the schools. The Labour Party had been a champion of grammar schools in the 1940s, but by the 1950s had begun to look at Graham Savage's ideas instead, which had been implemented partly in London.

In 1947 he introduced the London School Plan of comprehensive schools, wholly driven by the wishes of the incumbent Labour council. Although largely responsible for their first introduction, he had some misgivings about the comprehensive system; he hoped these could be alleviated, specifically that although at the same school, pupils would study different courses in keeping with their abilities. In this his ideas were more for bi-lateral schools than comprehensives. He explicitly did not want all pupils of differing abilities studying the same courses. To achieve this, schools would have to be very large – up to 400 in each year. In many comprehensive schools this is simply not possible.

He was knighted in 1947. He thought highly of direct grant grammar schools, saying in 1965 that they were the scaffolding on which a good state system of secondary education is slowly being built. Most of London's fifty five state grammar schools would stay until the 1970s. He retired in 1951. He passed away in 1981.

=== Outcome of his work ===
In later life, despite his satisfaction with lending British national pedagogy a more democratic character, he thought that the educational standards of comprehensive schools might have declined more than the marginal amount he had predicted in 1928.

== Personal life ==
He married May Thwaites, from Southchurch in Essex, in 1911 in Rochford. They had two sons and a daughter.

== See also ==
- Debates on the grammar school
- Tripartite System
- Anthony Crosland
- Social mobility
