= Dorothy Trump =

English physician

- Born: 24 January 1964; Redcar, North Riding of Yorkshire, England
- Died: 26 March 2013 (aged 49)
- Occupation: Physician
- Medical career
- Sub-specialties: Clinical genetics

Dorothy Trump (24 January 1964 – 26 March 2013) was an English physician who specialised in clinical genetics. Her research focused on genetic causes of blindness and deafness.

== Biography ==
Dorothy Trump was born on 24 January 1964 in Redcar, North Riding of Yorkshire, and raised in Stockton-on-Tees. Both of her parents, Leslie John and Iris Trump (born Iris Butler), were social workers. After attending Stockton Sixth Form College, she went on to study medicine at Downing College, Cambridge, graduating as MB BCh in 1988. She later spent three years as a genetics researcher at the Royal Postgraduate Medical School at Hammersmith Hospital under the supervision of Professor Rajesh V. Thakker, where she searched for the specific genetic defect in X-linked hypophosphataemia and worked with a group that attempted to map the first draft of the human genome. She was awarded a Doctor of Medicine for her research in 1996.

In 1995, Trump returned to Cambridge, where she undertook specialist training in clinical genetics while researching X-linked retinoschisis. She eventually identified the gene defect that causes the disease, but made the discovery only after a competing team. As a consultant and senior lecturer in genetics at Addenbrooke's Hospital, she specialised in genetic disorders affecting the eye, including X-linked congenital stationary night blindness and oculocutaneous albinism. She left Cambridge for Manchester in 2003 to take up a chair in human molecular genetics. In Manchester, she continued her research on the genetics of the eye but also developed an interest in the genetic causes of deafness. This led her to identify the gene defect that causes Perrault syndrome; her findings were published in 2013 in the American Journal of Human Genetics. She died on 26 March 2013, aged 49, from a soft-tissue sarcoma.
