= Cambridge (book) =

2005 book by Tim Rawle

- First edition Jacket with photograph by Tim Rawle
- Author: Tim Rawle with foreword by William Bortrick and drawings by Jeremy Bays; edited by John Adamson
- Illustrator: Tim Rawle (photographs)
- Cover artist: Tim Rawle
- Language: English
- Release number: 2nd edition
- Subject: Cambridge, history of architecture, architectural photography
- Genre: Reference
- Published: Cambridge
- Publisher: Frances Lincoln (first edition), Oxbridge Portfolio (second edition)
- Publication date: First published 2005, 2nd edition May 2016
- Publication place: United Kingdom
- Pages: 204
- ISBN: 978-0-9572867-2-6 2nd edition
- Website: Book's official web page

Cambridge is Tim Rawle's introduction to the architectural history of Cambridge. Concise essays telling the story of the city's growth from Roman times to the present day and of the development of the colleges of the University of Cambridge are profusely illustrated with Rawle's photographs of townscapes and views of the colleges.

== Summary ==
Dr Peter Richard's review in CAM captures the book's essence: "At the heart of the book lies a fascinating exploration of seven hundred years of University architecture," he wrote. "In a succession of striking images, Rawle examines halls and chapels, bridges, lanterns, gate towers and gardens. Accompanying the pictures are well informed captions and a substantial stylishly written essay that traces the city's history from Roman times."

== Critical reception ==
Writing in the Sunday Telegraph, Clover Stroud commented: "It takes a book such as this to remind us that there are places in Britain to rival any city in the world for architectural splendour." John Graham in the Catholic Herald remarked on the "strikingly beautiful photographs, which avoid the usual clichéd images, depicting instead the university's more unusual and private corners" and on the "excellent essay on the development of the colleges", "On more than one occasion," he noted,"I had the eerie sense of actually looking at the building itself when perusing the photograph." Paul Kirkley's two-page illustrated feature on the book published in Cambridge Evening News gives a glimpse of how Rawle's photography captures "the hidden beauty" of the city. Peter Richards, in his CAM review, wrote: "This is, quite simply, the best introduction to Cambridge ever published."
