= Tim Rawle =

English photographer

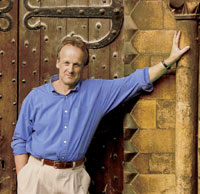
- Rawle at the Round Church, Cambridge, 2005
- Born: Ashford, Kent, England
- Education: St Martin's School of Art and Central School of Art and Design, London; Downing College, Cambridge; Architectural Association, London
- Occupations: Architectural photographer and writer
- Website: www.timrawle.com

Tim Rawle is an English architectural photographer and writer. He is best known for his photographs of buildings in Cambridge, England.

== Biography ==
Tim Rawle was born in Ashford, Kent. After studying fine art and graphic design at St Martin's School of Art and at the Central School of Art and Design, London, he read architecture at Downing College, Cambridge, continuing his education at the Architectural Association, where he was Caldicott Scholar.

He first came to attention with the publication of his book Cambridge Architecture in 1985. Besides providing the text and the photographs for this venture he also designed the book. The Daily Telegraph described it as "an astonishingly comprehensive book . . . a unique and valuable record". A revised edition was brought out by André Deutsch in 1993.

In 1987 he provided the photography and design for Cinzia Maria Sicca's Committed to Classicism: The Building of Downing College, Cambridge. The following year he was commissioned to design a new pictorial book on the National Portrait Gallery's collection as well as a small guide to the NPG's outstation at Bodelwyddan Castle, North Wales.

In 1991, he set up a small business called "The Cambridge Portfolio" to publish calendars, diaries, greetings cards and postcards featuring his photographs of Cambridge buildings and Cambridge town and gown. He did the photography and design for the official guide to King's College Chapel. For a period spanning several years he produced prospectuses for many Cambridge colleges and independent schools in south-east England.

In 2005 he published the book Cambridge (Frances Lincoln). In his review in CAM, the university magazine, Peter Richards wrote: "At the heart of the book lies a fascinating exploration of seven hundred years of University architecture . . . This is, quite simply, the best introduction to Cambridge ever published."

The Howard Foundation commissioned Rawle to be the author and photographer of a new book on Downing College published in 2015 and described by the Georgian as a "well-researched architectural history" with "exceptional photographs".

Rawle was appointed a Fellow Commoner of Downing College, Cambridge in 1987.

== Bibliography ==
- Cambridge Architecture (1st ed., sponsored by Cambridge Consultants) London: Trefoil Books, 1985. 224 pp. ISBN 0862940591; paperback ISBN 0862940508 OCLC 12128315
- Committed to Classicism: The Building of Downing College, Cambridge. With Cinzia Maria Sicca (main author), Edward Powell, Charles Harpum (contrib.) Cambridge: Downing College, Cambridge, 1987. 228 pp. ISBN 0951162012; paperback ISBN 0951162004 OCLC 14717806
- Cambridge Architecture (2nd ed.) London: André Deutsch, 1993. 240 pp. ISBN 0233988181 OCLC 29468655
- Cambridge (1st ed.). London: Frances Lincoln, 2005. 192 pp. ISBN 0711225494 OCLC 61176603
- Classic Cambridge: 100 Photographs by Tim Rawle. Cambridge: The Cambridge Portfolio, 2012. 128 pp. ISBN 9780957286702 OCLC 858070726
- The Chapel of Trinity College, Oxford. With Martin Kemp (author). London: Scala Arts & Heritage Publishers, 2014. 88 pp. ISBN 9781857598247 OCLC 834412864
- A Classical Adventure: The Architectural History of Downing College, Cambridge. Tim Rawle (author), Tim Rawle and Louis Sinclair (photographers), John Adamson (editor). Cambridge: Oxbridge Portfolio, 2015, 200 pp. ISBN 978 0 9572867 4 0 OCLC 931005141
- Cambridge. Tim Rawle (author and photographer), John Adamson (editor) (new edition with a foreword by William Bortrick). Cambridge: Oxbridge Portfolio, 2016, 204 pp. ISBN 978 0 9572867 2 6
