= Downing College, Cambridge =

College of the University of Cambridge

Coordinates: 52.2008°N 0.1248°E

Downing College
- University of Cambridge
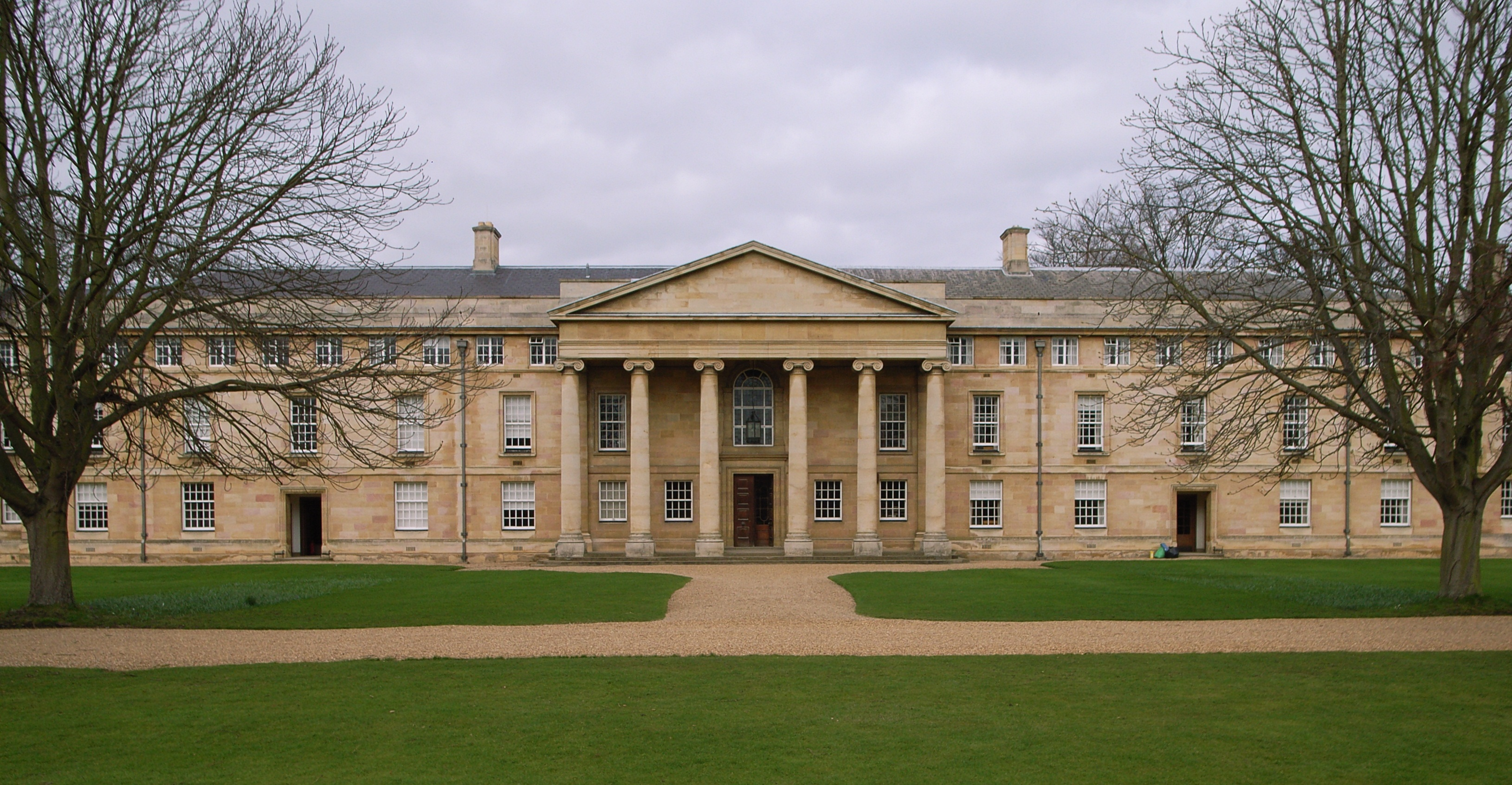
- Downing College Chapel

- Arms of Downing College; Arms: Barry of eight argent and vert, a griffin segreant or within a bordure azure charged with eight roses of the first seeded and barbed proper.
Scarf colours: black, with three narrow magenta stripes
- Location: Regent Street, Cambridge (map)
- Full name: Downing College in the University of Cambridge
- Abbreviation: DOW
- Motto: Quaerere Verum (Latin)
- Motto in English: Seek the truth
- Founder: Sir George Downing
- Established: 22 September 1800; 225 years ago
- Sister college: Lincoln College, Oxford
- Master: Graham Virgo
- Undergraduates: 493 (2022-23)
- Postgraduates: 455 (2022-23)
- Endowment: £44.1m (2022)
- Visitor: The Crown ex officio
- Website: www.dow.cam.ac.uk
- JCR: www.jcr.dow.cam.ac.uk
- MCR: downingmcr.soc.srcf.net
- Boat club: Downing College Boat Club

Map
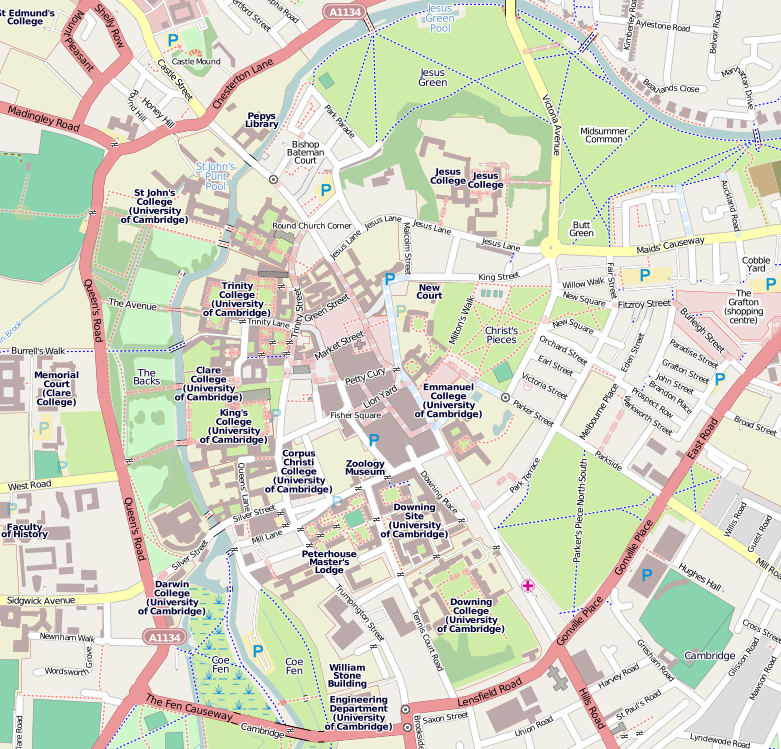
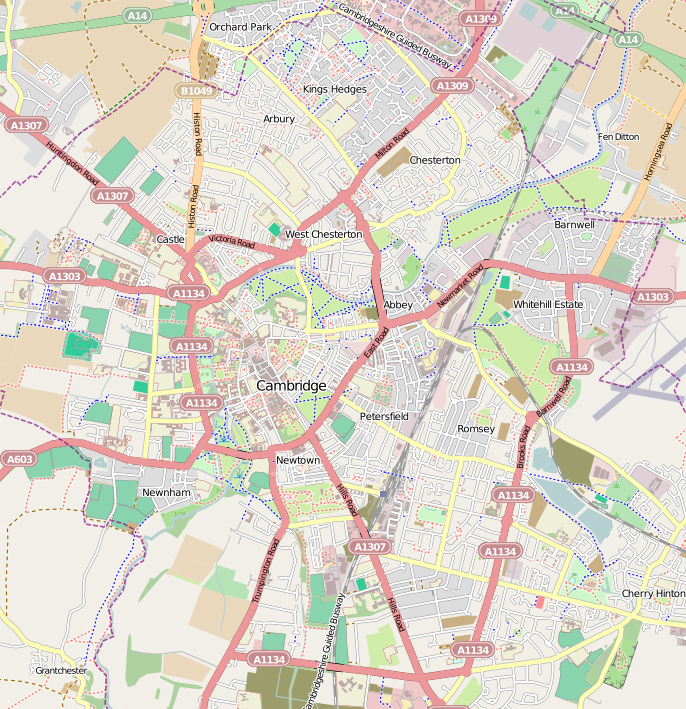
- Location within Central Cambridge Location within Cambridge

Downing College is a constituent college of the University of Cambridge and currently has around 950 students. Founded in 1800, it was the only college to be added to the university between 1596 and 1869, and is often described as the oldest of the new colleges and the newest of the old. Downing College was formed "for the encouragement of the study of Law and Medicine and of the cognate subjects of Moral and Natural Science", and has developed a reputation amongst Cambridge colleges for Law and Medicine.

In 2012, Downing was named one of the two most eco-friendly Cambridge colleges.

== History ==
Upon the death of Sir George Downing, 3rd Baronet in 1749, the wealth left by his grandfather, Sir George Downing, 1st Baronet, who served both Cromwell and Charles II and built 10 Downing Street (a door formerly from Number 10 is in use in the college), was applied by his will. Under this will, as he had no direct issue (he was legally separated from his wife), the family fortune was left to his cousin, Sir Jacob Downing, 4th Baronet, and if he died without heir, to three cousins in succession. If they all died without issue, the estates were to be used to found a college at Cambridge called Downing.

Sir Jacob died in 1764, and as the other named heirs had also died, the college should have come into existence then, but Sir Jacob's widow, Margaret, refused to give up the estates and the various relatives who were Sir George's legal heirs had to take costly and prolonged action in the Court of Chancery to compel her to do so. She died in 1778 but her second husband and the son of her sister continued to resist the heirs-at-law's action until 1800 when the court decided in favour of Sir George's will and George III granted Downing a royal charter, marking the official foundation of the college.

== Buildings ==
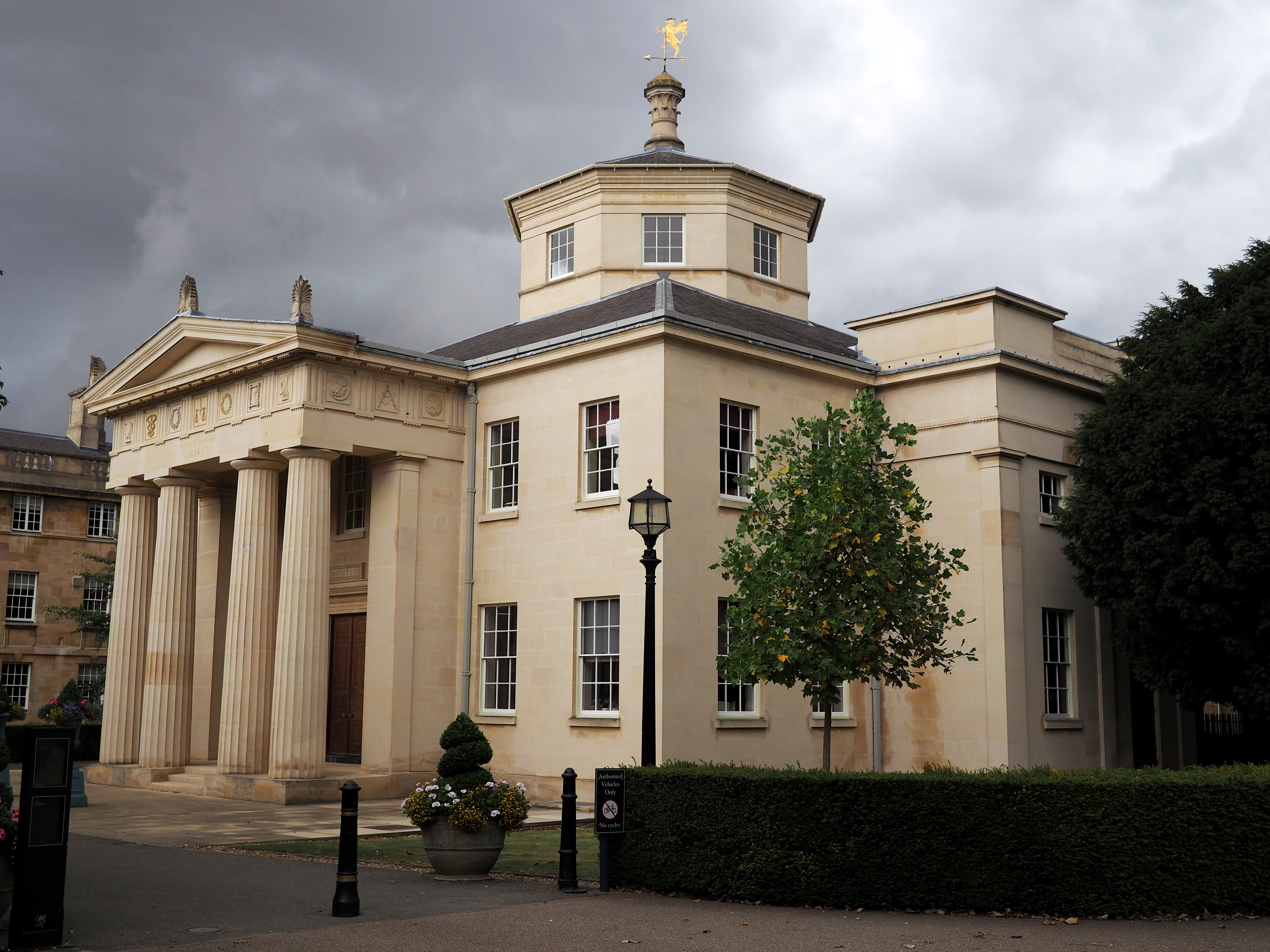
The Maitland Robinson Library by Quinlan Terry, completed in 1992.

The architect William Wilkins was commissioned by the trustees of the Downing estate, who included the Master of Clare College and St John's College and the archbishops of Canterbury and York, to design the plan for the college. Wilkins, a disciple of the neo-classical architectural style, designed the first wholly campus-based college plan in the world based on a magnificent entrance on Downing Street reaching back to form the largest court in Cambridge, extending to Lensfield Road. But this was not to be.

The estate was much reduced by the suit in Chancery, and the grand plans failed. Much of the north side of what was then the Pembroke Leys was sold to the university and is now home to scientific buildings ("The Downing Site"). In fact, only limited East and West ranges were initially built, with the plans for a library and chapel on the south face of the college shelved.

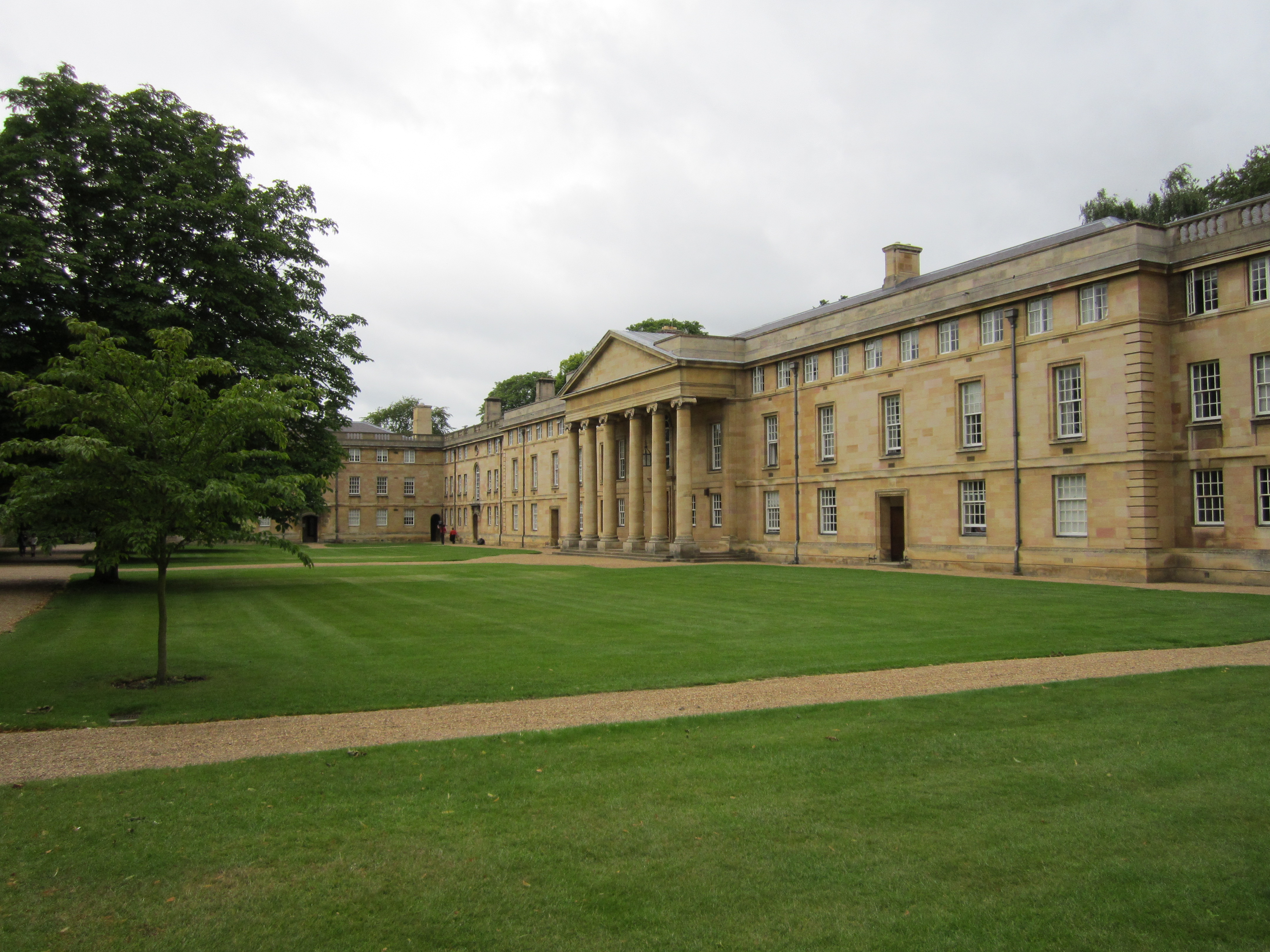
Downing College Chapel (behind the portico), built in 1951

The third side of the square was only completed in 1951 with the building of the college chapel. Where the fourth side would have been is now a large paddock (known simply as "The Paddock"), with many trees. Though not fully enclosed, the court formed before Downing College is perhaps the largest in Cambridge or Oxford (a title contested with Trinity College's Great Court).

The most recent building additions are the Howard Lodge accommodation, the Howard Building, and most recent of all the Howard Theatre which opened in 2010. These were sponsored by the Howard Foundation, and are located behind the main court around their own small garden. These facilities are used for conference and businesses gatherings outside the student term.

=== Heong Gallery ===
The Heong Gallery, opened in February 2016, is a modern and contemporary art gallery at Downing. It is named for Alwyn Heong, an alumnus of the college, who is a supporter of the visual arts. The conversion of a stables building by Caruso St John won a RIBA regional award.

== Student life ==
Downing students remain prominent in the university world; in the past few years Cambridge Union Presidents, Blues captains, Law and Economic Society Presidents and more have hailed from the college. Downing has a particular reputation as the 'Law College'.

The Griffin has been the undergraduate student magazine for over 100 years.

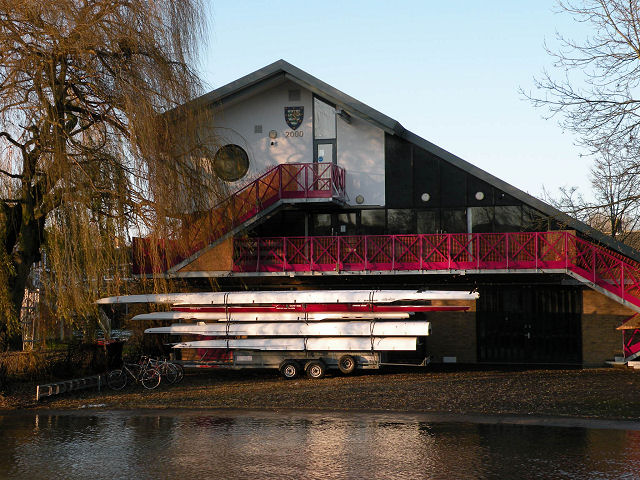
Downing College boathouse on the River Cam, it was rebuilt in 2000. Here a trailer of rowing boats is shown outside the building.

=== Sport ===
The college fields teams in a range of sports, including men's football, men's and women's rugby, tennis and ultimate.

Downing College Rugby Union Football Club is one of Cambridge’s top teams, having secured victory in both the 2019 Cuppers and 2022 Shield competitions. The rise of Downing has also included a win in the Plate competition during the 2017/18 season.

Downing College Boat Club is successful too, with the Women's first boat gaining Lents Headship of the river in 2004 and most recently in 2020, and the Mays Headship in the 2014 and 2015 May Bumps. The men's first boat has held the headship several times in the 1980s and 1990s (for example in 1994 to 1996) while gaining the Mays headship in 1996 and the Lents Headship in 2014, on each occasion recognising the tradition of "burning the boat" (using an old wooden 8 oared boat), while the rowers of the winning boat jump the flames. They both currently hold positions at or near the top in both University bumps races [Lents and Mays].

== Gallery ==
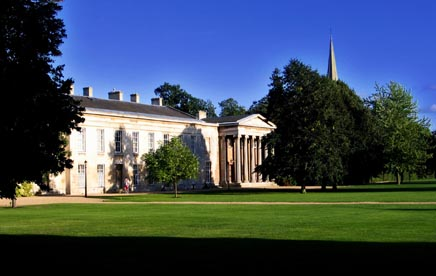
East Range, Downing College, November 2006

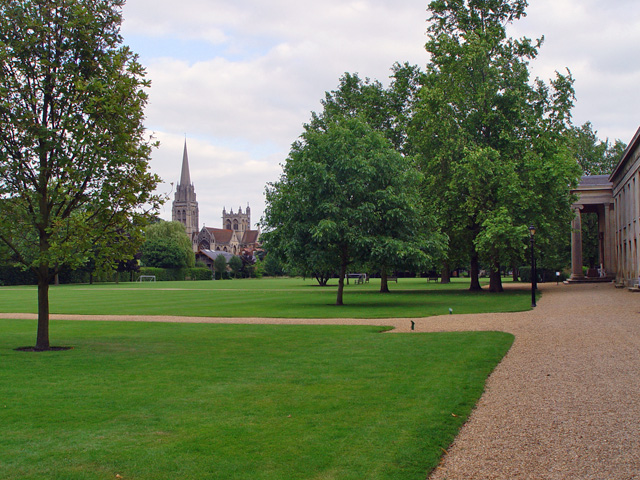
The Paddock, the green space between the trees. The church on the skyline is on Lensfield Road.

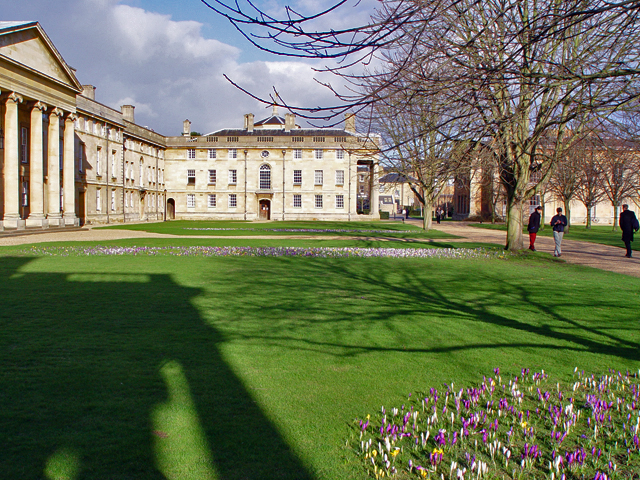
North east view of the lawns outside the chapel.

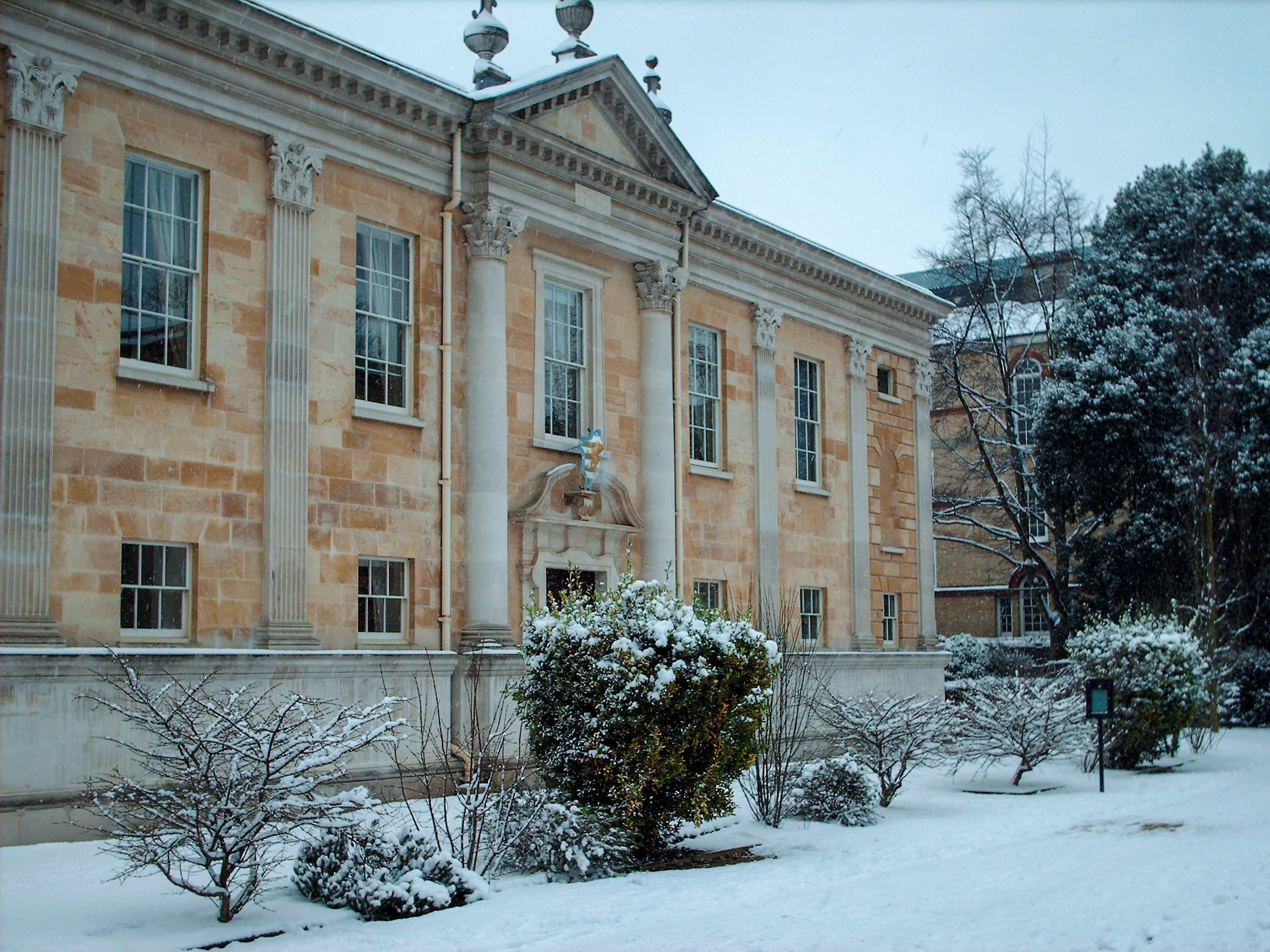
The Howard Building

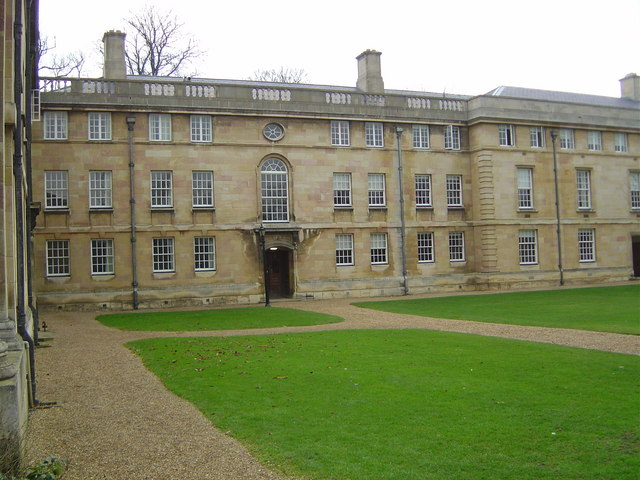
J Staircase accommodation

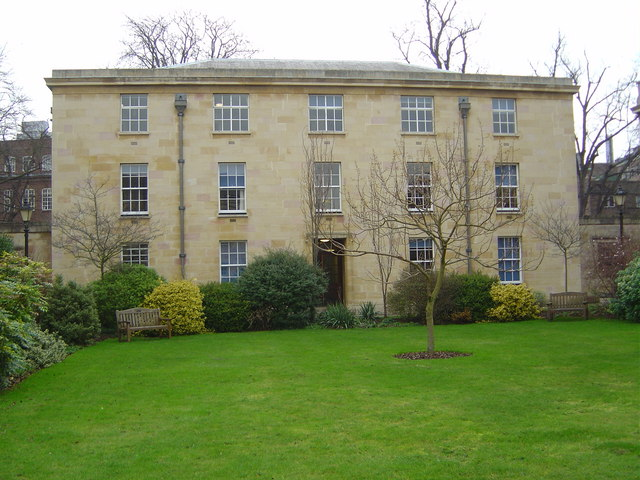
The Kenny Building

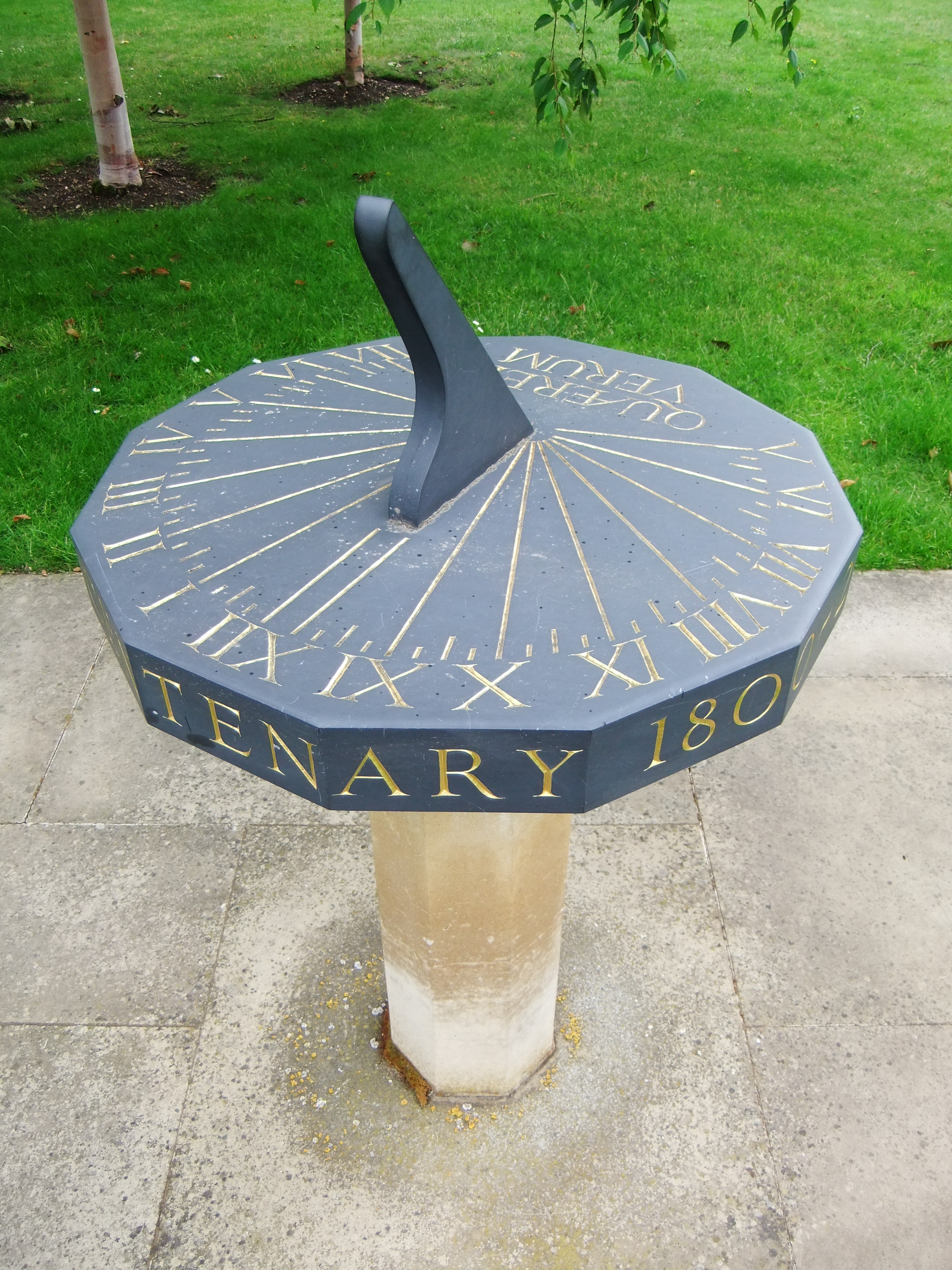
A sundial commemorating the bicentenary of the college

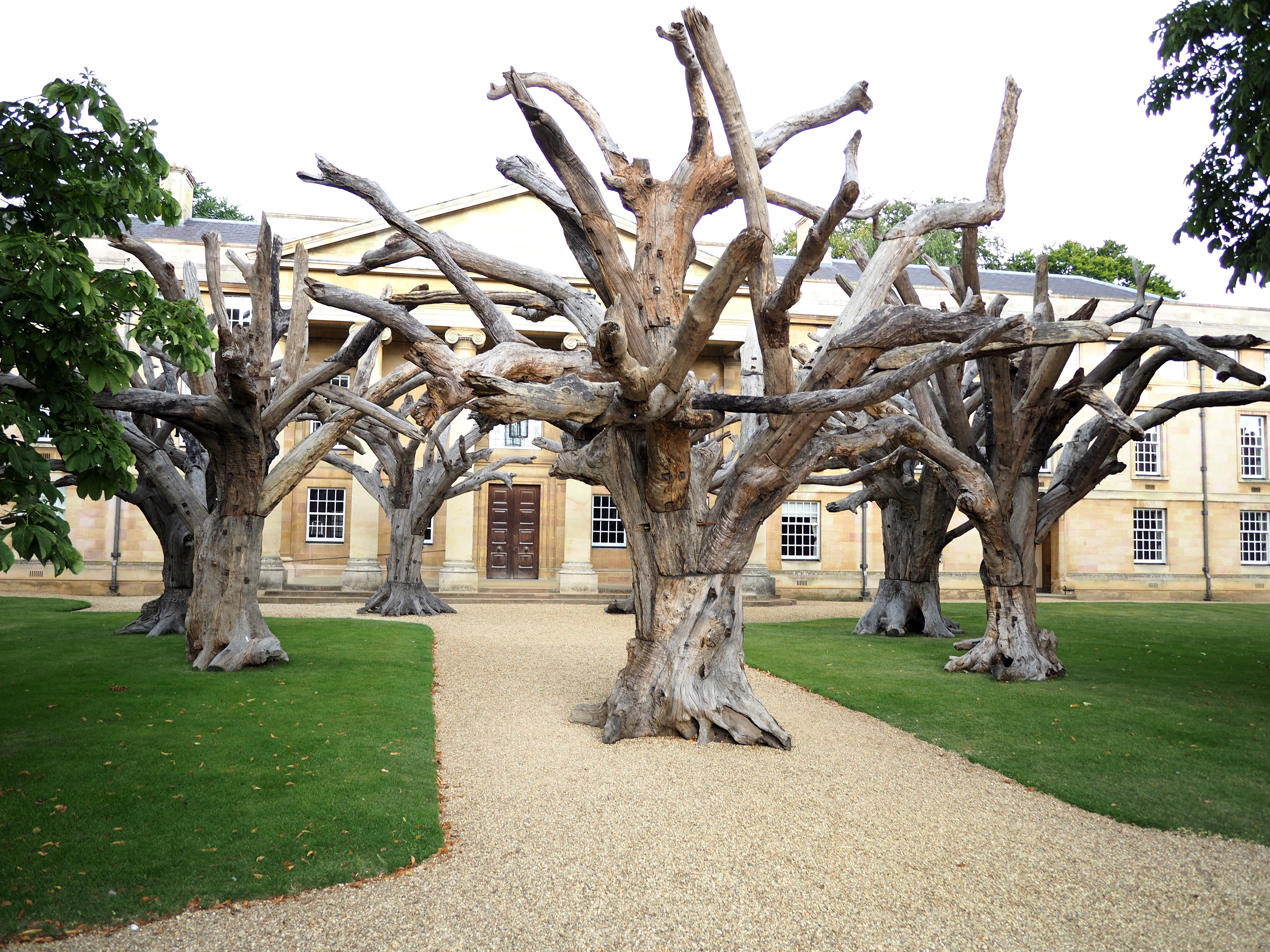
Ai Weiwei Trees, part of a 2016 exhibition at the Heong Gallery

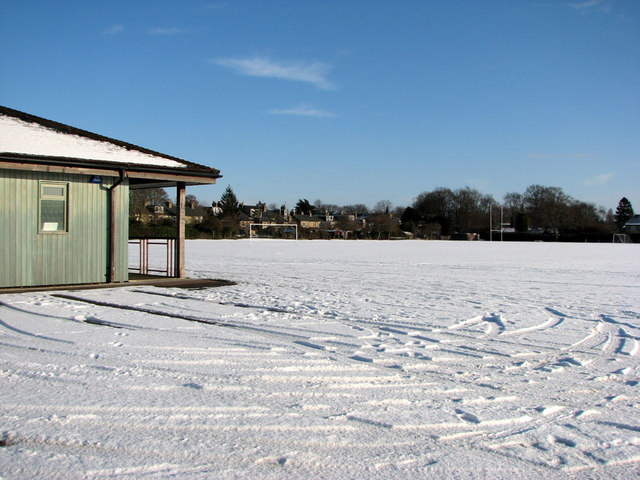
The college sports ground in the snow

== People associated with Downing ==
The college is renowned for its strong legal tradition, being built up by Clive Parry, his pupil and successor John Hopkins and Graham Virgo. Legal notables who have been honorary fellows of the college include the late Sir John Smith, the pre-eminent criminal lawyer of his generation; Lord Collins of Mapesbury, the first solicitor to be appointed to the Court of Appeal and House of Lords; and Sir Robert Jennings, former president of the International Court of Justice.

=== Notable alumni ===
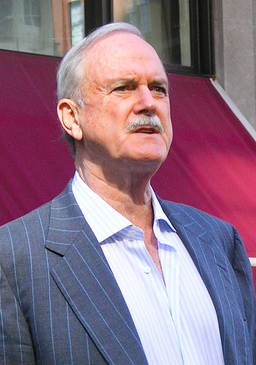
John Cleese, actor and comedian

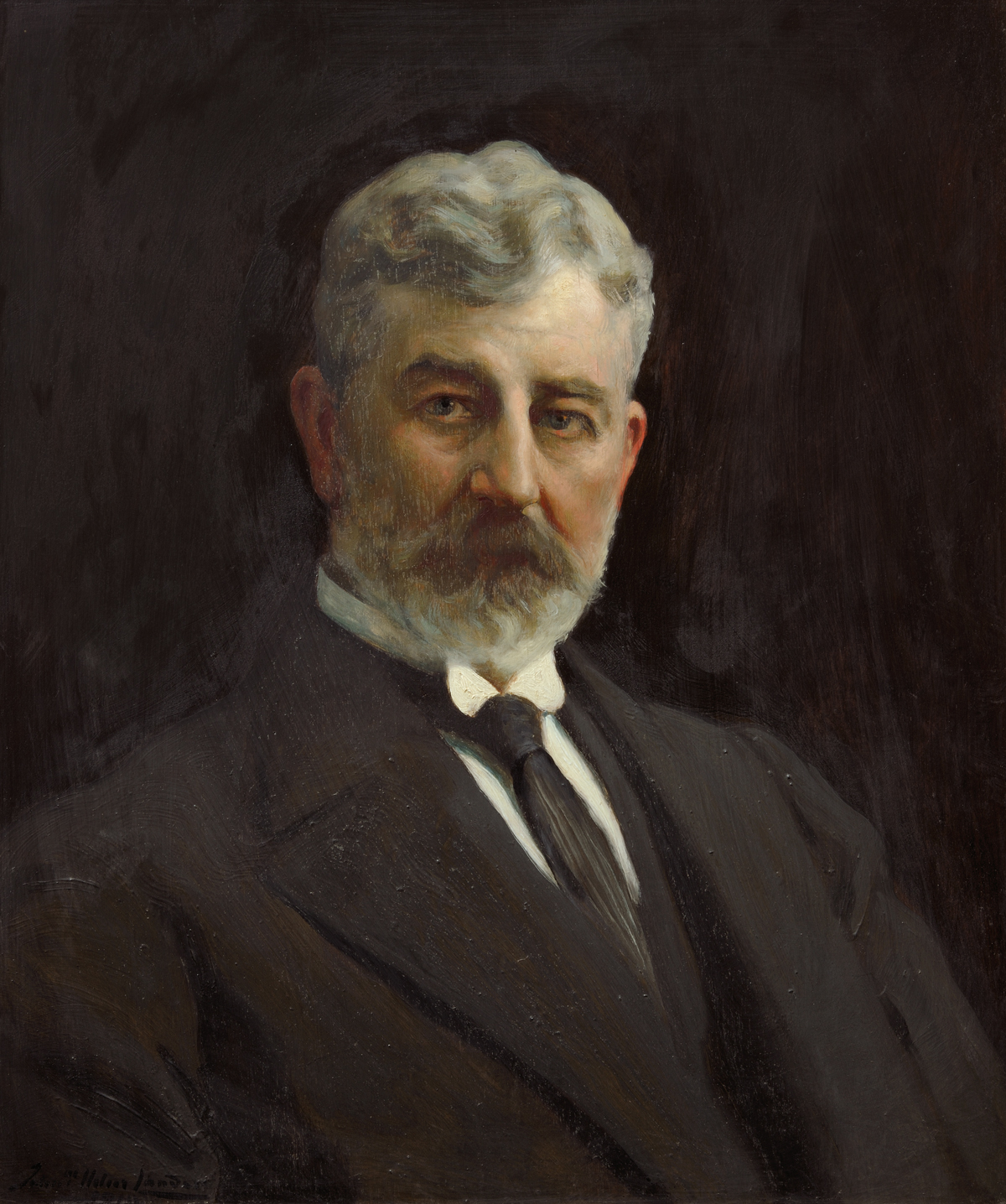
William Philip Schreiner, Prime Minister of the Cape Colony during the Second Boer War

Michael Atherton broadcaster, journalist and a former England international cricketer.

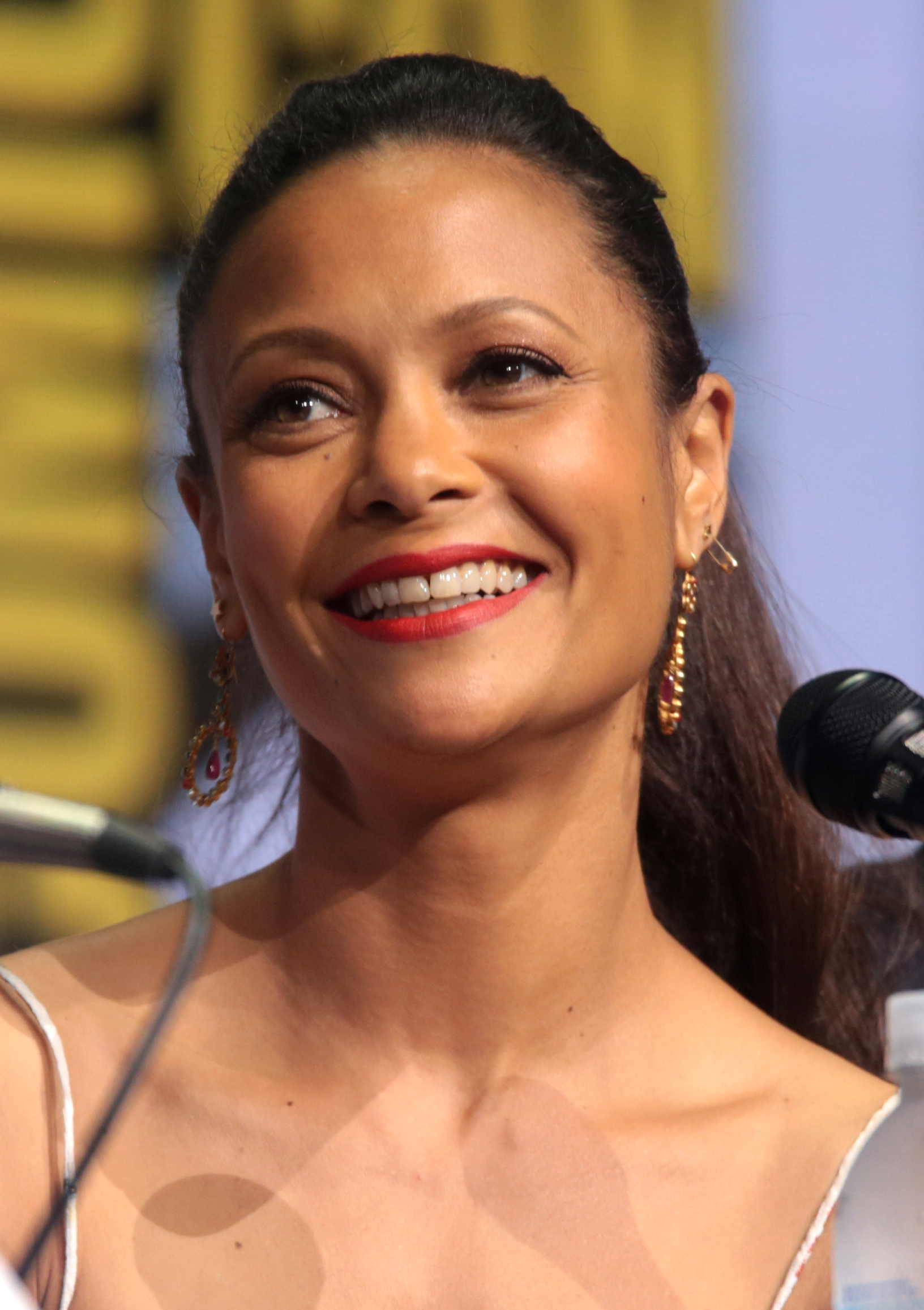
Thandiwe Newton, BAFTA award-winning actress

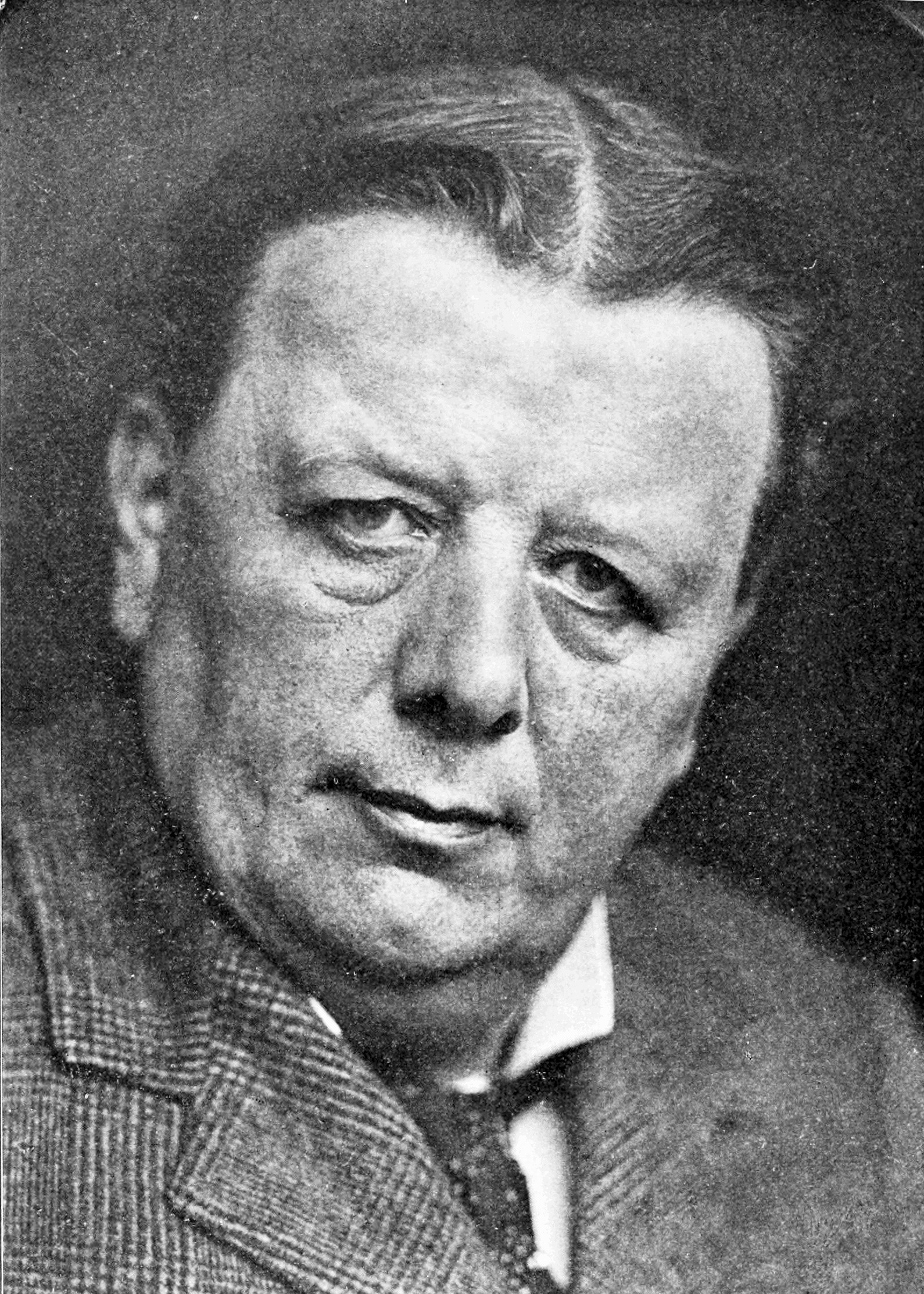
Sir Ray Lankester, invertebrate zoologist and evolutionary biologist

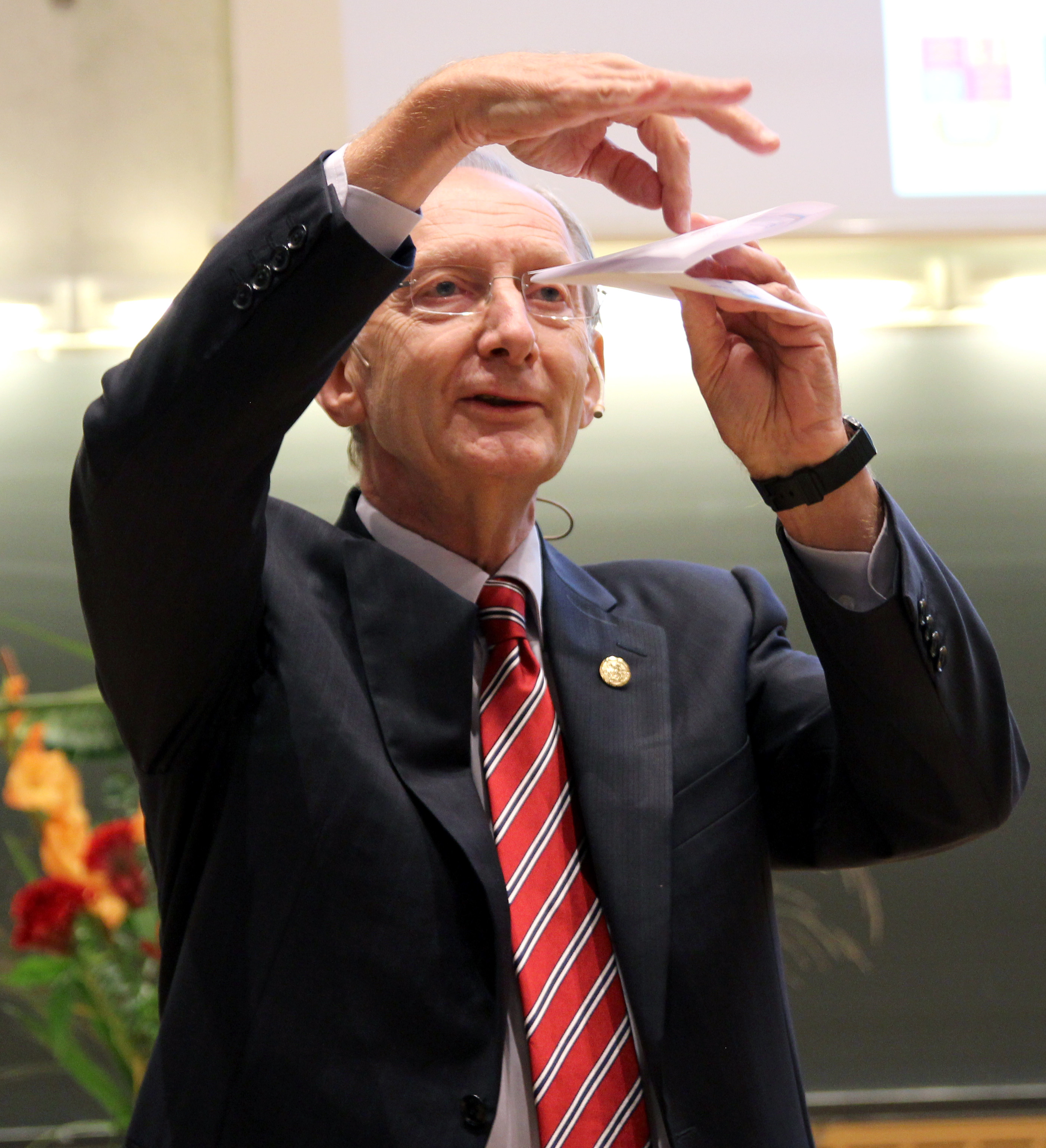
Sir John Pendry, theoretical physicist

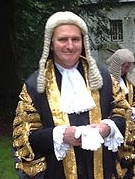
David Lloyd Jones, Lord Lloyd-Jones, Justice of the Supreme Court of the United Kingdom

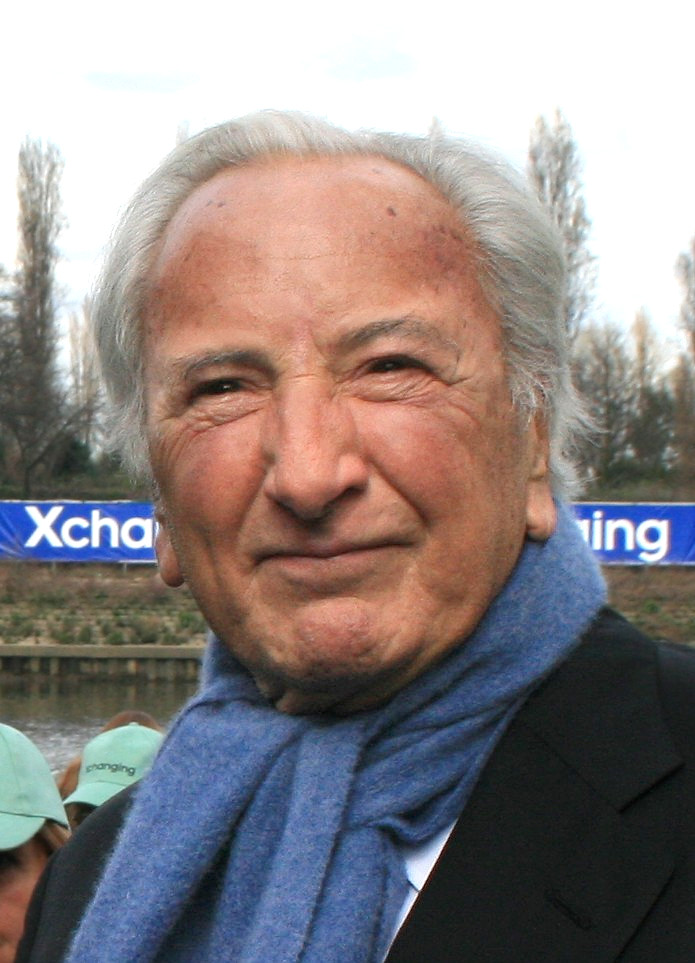
Michael Winner, film director and producer

John Leslie Green, Victoria Cross recipient

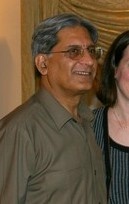
Aitzaz Ahsan, Pakistani politician

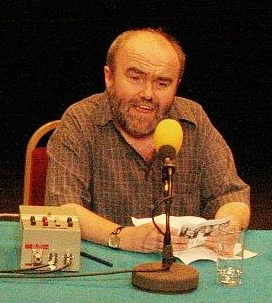
Andy Hamilton, comedian
- Peter Ackroyd, Biblical scholar
- Michael Apted, TV and film director and producer
- Mike Atherton, England cricket player
- Martin Baker, Master of Music, Westminster Cathedral
- Richard Baker, former CEO of Boots Group
- Richard Barbrook, lecturer at University of Westminster
- Michael Baxandall, art historian
- Farmida Bi, lawyer
- Quentin Blake, author and illustrator
- John Blofeld, Taoist and Buddhist author
- Sir Derek Bowett, international lawyer, former Whewell Professor of International Law
- Giles Brindley, physiologist
- Frank Buttle, priest and founder of two charities
- John Cardy, physicist
- J. C. D. Clark, historian
- John Cleese, actor and comedian of Monty Python fame
- Geoffrey Cox KC, barrister and Conservative MP
- Mark Cox, tennis player
- Lawrence Collins, judge
- Rob Crilly, journalist and author
- Scott Davidson, VC, Professor of Law
- Louise Dean, author
- Terrance Dicks, author, TV writer, script editor, producer
- Sir Bernard Eder, High Court judge
- D. J. Enright, poet
- Arnold Goodman, lawyer
- Hari Singh Gour, lawyer and jurist
- John Leslie Green, VC
- Richard Gregory, experimental psychologist (neuropsychology, visual perception), author of Eye and Brain (1966)
- Nick Griffin, British National Party leader
- Andy Hamilton, comedian, director and critic
- Hildebrand Wolfe Harvey, marine biologist
- Hamish Henderson, Scots poet
- John Herington, military historian and airman
- Philip Hobsbaum, poet
- David Holbrook, poet, author, critic
- Yong Pung How, second chief justice of Singapore
- Howard Jacobson, novelist
- Stan Kelly-Bootle, pioneer computer scientist
- Martin Kemp, art historian
- Clive King, author
- Ray Lankester, zoologist
- Sir Frank Lee, civil servant, Master of Corpus Christi College
- Sir Kim Lewison, Lord Justice of Appeal
- Godfrey Lienhardt, anthropologist
- Peter Lienhardt, social anthropologist
- David Lister, Origami historian
- Lord David Lloyd Jones, Justice of the Supreme Court of the United Kingdom
- Malcolm MacDonald, writer on music
- Sir Richard McCombe, Lord Justice of Appeal
- Bernard Mayes, journalist, professor and author
- Ed Mayo, economist
- Wilfrid Mellers, music critic and composer
- Karl Miller, literary editor, critic and writer
- Mark Moore, headmaster Clifton College
- George Mosse, historian
- Henry Naylor, comedian and playwright
- Michael Neubert, British politician
- Thandiwe Newton, actress
- Trevor Nunn, theatre and film director
- Iain Overton, investigative journalist
- Tim Parks, novelist, university professor, translator
- Kathryn Parsons, British tech entrepreneur, co-founder of Decoded
- Gordon Pask, cybernetician
- Stuart Peach, Air Chief Marshal and Chairman of the NATO Military Committee
- John Pendry, theoretical physicist
- John Penrose, politician
- E.O.E. Pereira, engineer
- Rubel Phillips, lawyer and politician from Mississippi
- Justin Pollard, historian, writer
- Victoria Prentis KC, Attorney General and Conservative MP
- Amol Rajan, former editor, The Independent journalist, broadcaster
- Brian Redhead, author, journalist, broadcaster
- Gordon Reece, journalist, TV producer, political strategist
- Derek Robinson, novelist, rugby official
- Graham Savage, Education Officer for London County Council, influential advocate for comprehensive schools
- William Schreiner, Prime Minister of the Cape Colony during the South African War
- Francis Terry, classicist and architect
- John Treherne, Entomologist and author
- Dorothy Trump, geneticist
- Leigh Turner, diplomat
- Tom Udall, United States Senator from New Mexico
- Rumi Verjee, businessman and philanthropist
- Annabel Vernon, world rowing champion
- Lord Wallace of Tankerness, lawyer and politician; former Deputy First Minister of Scotland
- Arthur Watts, international lawyer, diplomat and arbitrator
- Richard Weber, mathematician
- Philip William Wheeldon, Bishop of Whitby and Bishop of Kimberley and Kuruman
- Caroline Wilson, diplomat
- Michael Winner, film director and producer, restaurant critic

== Bibliography ==
- Bradley, Simon; Pevsner, Nikolaus (2014). Buildings of England: Cambridgeshire. Pevsner Architectural Guides. New Haven: Yale University Press. ISBN 978-0-300-20596-1.
- French, Stanley, ed. (1982). Aspects of Downing History. Cambridge: Downing College Association. OCLC 13078974.
- Hope, Thomas (1804). Observations on the Plans and Elevations Designed by James Wyatt, Architect, for Downing College, Cambridge: In a Letter to Francis Annesley, Esq. M. P. London: D.N. Shury. OCLC 61617898.
- Liscombe, Rhodri Windsor (1980). William Wilkins, 1778–1839. Cambridge: Cambridge University Press. ISBN 978-0-521-22528-1.
- Stevens, Horace William Pettit (1889). Downing College. London: F.E. Robinson. OCLC 18275839.
- Rawle, Tim (2015). Adamson, John (ed.). A Classical Adventure: The Architectural History of Downing College, Cambridge. Photography by Tim Rawle and Louis Sinclair. Cambridge: The Oxbridge Portfolio. ISBN 978-0-9572867-4-0.
- Smith, Otto Saumarez (2013). "A Strange Brutalist 'Primitive Hut': Howell, Killick, Partridge and Amis's Senior Combination Room at Downing College, Cambridge". Twentieth Century Architecture (Oxford and Cambridge: No. 11). The Twentieth Century Society: 148–165. JSTOR 24644446.
- Sicca, Cinzia Maria (1987). Committed to Classicism: The Building of Downing College, Cambridge. Contributions by Charles Harpum and Edward Powell. Photography, design, and production by Tim Rawle. Cambridge: Downing College. ISBN 978-0-9511620-1-9.
- Watkin, David (2000). The Age of Wilkins: The Architecture of Improvement. Cambridge: Fitzwilliam Museum. ISBN 978-0-9538462-0-7.
- Watkin, David (2004). The Architect King: George III and the Culture of the Enlightenment. London: Royal Collection Publications. ISBN 978-1-902163-50-5.
- Watkin, David (2006). Radical Classicism: The Architecture of Quinlan Terry. New York: Rizzoli. ISBN 978-0-8478-2806-7.
- Watkin, David (2015). The Practice of Classical Architecture: The Architecture of Quinlan and Francis Terry, 2005-2015. Foreword by Charles, Prince of Wales. New York: Rizzoli. ISBN 978-0-8478-4490-6.
- Willis, Robert; Clark, John Willis (1886). The Architectural History of the University of Cambridge and of the Colleges of Cambridge and Eton. Vol. 1–4. Cambridge: Cambridge University Press.
