= The Cambridge Diet =

Meal replacement fad diet

The Cambridge Diet was a very-low-calorie meal replacement fad diet developed in the 1960s. The diet launched with different versions in the US and the UK. The US version filed for bankruptcy and shut down shortly after the deaths of several dieters. The UK diet has also been known as the Cambridge Weight Plan, but is now known as The 1:1 Diet.

== History ==
The Cambridge Diet was initially used and developed in hospital weight loss programs in the 1960s by Alan Howard at Cambridge University, England. Rights to the original Cambridge powder formula in the United States were obtained by Cambridge Direct Sales in 1979, and after improvements for flavor the Cambridge diet was launched as a commercial product in the United States in 1980. It was sold through multi-level marketing. Howard created his own, different flavor improvements and launched a commercial UK version of the Cambridge diet in 1984. Since 2005 the UK company that makes the product is Cambridge Nutritional Foods Limited.

The US diet was very popular in the 1980s but was also the subject of some controversy. It came under scrutiny from regulators and health authorities after potential health concerns were raised. Under pressure from the U.S. Food and Drug Administration the calorie intake was raised from 330 kcal/day to 800 kcal/day. In 1985 Cambridge Diet Plan paid a six figure sum to settle a case brought by the family of a 31 year old woman who had died while following the Cambridge Diet. The FDA stated that eight such deaths were "potentially linked" to the Cambridge diet. In the early 1980s there were six documented deaths of people following the Cambridge liquid diet.

In 1987 a UK government Health Department report was critical of evidence submitted by Cambridge Nutrition – the working group responsible were not convinced by claims that the Cambridge Diet achieved protein sparing as well as conventional calorie restricted diets, and were concerned about conservation of lean tissue during dieting.

== Composition ==
Food is principally in liquid form and includes soups, shakes, bars, and meals sold as part of the diet. Most of the meal replacement products sold as part of the diet are manufactured in the UK. As of 2006, 3 servings of the liquid diet had a macronutrient composition of 43 g of protein, 42 g of carbohydrate and 8 g of fat, supplemented with micronutrients.

== 1:1 Diet ==
As of 2019 the diet was renamed the "1:1 diet". The 1:1 Diet is categorized as a very-low-calorie diet. The diet plan has 6 variants or "steps." The first step consists of 3-4 products totaling at least 600 kcal per day. The remaining steps reintroduce regular meals and remove the 1:1 products in various combinations.

== Criticism ==
The Cambridge diet has been characterized as a fad diet due to its starvation-level calorie intake, extreme weight loss, and its rapid rise and fall in popularity in the 1980s.

Modern guidelines state that a diet of less than 1000 kcal/day should not be followed for more than 12 weeks, and a diet of less than 600kcal/day should have medical supervision, as very-low-calorie diets can lead to sudden death by cardiac arrest. When it was launched in 1980 the diet specified an intake of 330 kcal/day, and as recently as 2019 allowed an intake of 450 kcal/day. While there is some evidence that these types of diets result in short-term weight loss, there is little evidence of long-term benefit.

There are concerns regarding the cost due to the fact that people must buy at least two weeks of product at a time. The British Dietetic Association lists the possible adverse side effects as including "bad breath, a dry mouth, tiredness, dizziness, insomnia, nausea and constipation". In 2005, the American Academy of Family Physicians recommended avoiding fad diets such as the Cambridge Diet.
