= Anti-competitive practices =

Practices that prevent or reduce competition in a market by a business or government

Anti-competitive practices are business or government practices that prevent or reduce competition in a market. Antitrust laws ensure businesses do not engage in competitive practices that harm other, usually smaller, businesses or consumers. These laws are formed to promote healthy competition within a free market by limiting the abuse of monopoly power. Competition allows companies to compete in order for products and services to improve, promote innovation, and provide more choices for consumers. In order to obtain greater profits, some large enterprises take advantage of market power to hinder survival of new entrants. Anti-competitive behavior can undermine the efficiency and fairness of the market, leaving consumers with little choice to obtain a reasonable quality of service.

Anti-competitive behavior refers to actions taken by a business or organization to limit, restrict or eliminate competition in a market, usually in order to gain an unfair advantage or dominate the market. These practices are often considered illegal or unethical and can harm consumers, other businesses and the broader economy. Anti-competitive behavior is used by business and governments to lessen competition within the markets so that monopolies and dominant firms can generate supernormal profit margins and deter competitors from the market. Therefore, it is heavily regulated and punishable by law in cases where it substantially affects the market.

Anti-competitive practices are commonly only deemed illegal when the practice results in a substantial dampening in competition, hence why for a firm to be punished for any form of anti-competitive behavior they generally need to be a monopoly or a dominant firm in a duopoly or oligopoly who has significant influence over the market.

== Types ==
Anti-competitive behavior can be grouped into two classifications. Horizontal restraints regard anti-competitive behavior that involves competitors at the same level of the supply chain. These practices include mergers, cartels, collusions, price-fixing, price discrimination and predatory pricing. On the other hand, the second category is vertical restraint which implements restraints against competitors due to anti-competitive practice between firms at different levels of the supply chain e.g. supplier-distributor relationships. These practices include exclusive dealing, refusal to deal/sell, resale price maintenance and more.

=== Horizontal integration ===
Horizontal integration can result in economies of scale, economies of density and be anti-competitive. When two companies with similar products or product characteristics merge horizontally, there is less competition. Horizontal mergers can also easily lead to a monopoly, reducing consumers' choices and indirectly harming consumers' interests.

=== Vertical integration ===
Vertical integration can result in economies of scope and reduce the hold-up problem and be anti-competitive. In absence of perfect competition, the Chicago school of economics argues that vertical integration may be pro-competitive by reducing double marginalization.

== Common anti-competitive actions ==
- Dumping, also known as predatory pricing, is a commercial strategy for which a company sells a product at an aggressively low price in a competitive market at a loss. A company with large market share and the ability to temporarily sacrifice selling a product or service at below average cost can drive competitors out of the market, after which the company would be free to raise prices for a greater profit. For example, many developing countries have accused China of dumping. In 2006, the country was accused of dumping silk and satin in the Indian markets at a cheaper rate which affected the local manufacturers adversely.
- Exclusive dealing, where a retailer or wholesaler is obliged by contract to only purchase from the contracted supplier. This mechanism prevents retailers to lessen profit maximisation and/or consumer choice. In 1999, Dentsply entered a 7 years court complaint by the U.S., the dental wholesaler had been successfully sued for using monopoly power to restrain trade using exclusive dealings within contract requirements.
- Price fixing, where companies collude to set prices, effectively dismantling the free market by not engaging in competition with each other. In 2018, travel agency giant, Flight Centre was fined $12.5 million for encouraging a collusive price fixing plan between 3 international airlines from between 2005 and 2009.
- Refusal to deal, e.g., two companies agree not to use a certain vendor. In 2010, Cabcharge refused, on commercial terms, to allow its non-cash payment instruments to be accepted and processed electronically by Travel Tab/Mpos' system for the payment of taxi fares. Travel Tab/Mpos requested access to the instruments but Cabcharge refused twice. Penalties for the first and second refusal were $2 million and $9 million respectively.
- Dividing territories, an agreement by two companies to stay out of each other's way and reduce competition in the agreed-upon territories. Also known as 'market sharing', a practice in which businesses geographically divide or allocate customers using contractual agreements that include non-competition on established customers, not producing the same goods or services and/or selling within specific regions. Boral and CSR formed a pre-mix concrete cartel and were penalized for bid rigging, price fixing and market sharing at an amount over $6.6million and a maximum of $100,000 on each of the 6 executives involved. The companies had agreed to recognize clients as belonging to suppliers without competition over regular meetings and phone conversations. Company market shares were monitored to ensure the agreement was not breached - this led to over-charging on construction quotes which were used by federal, state and local government projects.
- Tying, where products that are not naturally related must be purchased together. This incumbent strategy forces the buyer to purchase an unnecessary product from a separate market, implicitly lessening competition in various markets by increasing unnatural barriers to entry as entrants are unable to compete on a full line of products nor on price. In 2006, Apple iTunes iPod lost a $10 million 10 year antitrust case when iPods were sold between September 2006 to March 2009 that were only compatible with tracks from the iTunes Store or those downloaded from CDs.
- Resale price maintenance, when a manager sells to a distributor, the resale price is agreed to not fall below a specified minimum value. However, when the retail price decreases, the manufacturer does sell more products. This is interesting from a management perspective. This strategy is controversial, and the benefits are to protect some inefficient small stores or manufacturers from competition threats. But at the same time, this strategy can easily lead to the level price cartel of brand operators.
- Technology monopoly: This type of monopoly occurs when one company has exclusive control over a particular technology or innovation, thus enabling them to dominate the market. For example, a company that owns a patent for a breakthrough technology may have a technology monopoly.
- Legal loopholes: This type of monopoly occurs when the government grants a company exclusive rights or privileges to operate in a particular market. For example, patents and Copyrights provide temporary monopolies to inventors and creators to encourage innovation and creativity.

Unfair competition includes a number of areas of law involving acts by one competitor or group of competitors which harm another in the field, and which may give rise to criminal offenses and civil causes of action. The most common actions falling under the banner of unfair competition include:

- Matters pertaining to antitrust law, known in the European Union as competition law. Antitrust violations constituting unfair competition occur when one competitor attempts to force others out of the market (or prevent others from entering the market) through tactics such as predatory pricing or obtaining exclusive purchase rights to raw materials needed to make a competing product.
- Trademark infringement and passing off, which occur when the maker of a product uses a name, logo, or other identifying characteristics to deceive consumers into thinking that they are buying the product of a competitor. In the United States, this form of unfair competition is prohibited under the common law and by state statutes, and governed at the federal level by the Lanham Act.
- Misappropriation of trade secrets, which occurs when one competitor uses espionage, bribery, or outright theft to obtain economically advantageous information in the possession of another. In the United States, this type of activity is forbidden by the Uniform Trade Secrets Act and the Economic Espionage Act of 1996.
- Trade libel, the spreading of false information about the quality or characteristics of a competitor's products, is prohibited at common law.
- Tortious interference, which occurs when one competitor convinces a party having a relationship with another competitor to breach a contract with, or duty to, the other competitor is also prohibited at common law.
- Anti-competitive agreements: Firms may enter into agreements that limit competition, such as agreements to fix prices, limit production or supply, or divide markets. These agreements harm competition, reduce consumer choice and lead to higher prices or lower quality products or services.
- Mergers and acquisitions that harm competition: Mergers and acquisitions that result in a significant reduction in market competition may be considered anti-competitive. This may include actions such as acquiring a competitor to eliminate or reduce competition, or merging to form a dominant market player who may engage in anti-competitive behavior.
- Exclusive deals or tie-in arrangements: Companies may enter into exclusive deals or tie-in arrangements that require customers or suppliers to trade with them exclusively or purchase one product or service in order to obtain another. These practices can limit consumer choice and limit competition by preventing competitors from entering major distribution channels or markets.

Also criticized are:

- Absorption of a competitor or competing technology, where a powerful firm effectively co-opts or swallows its competitor rather than let it either compete directly or be absorbed by another firm
- Subsidies from government which allow a firm to function without being profitable, giving them an advantage over competition or effectively barring competition
- Compulsory tax-financed public provision, when a government uses mandatory taxation to fund and supply a good or service, regardless of whether individual taxpayers demand or use it, thereby reducing the viability of voluntary private alternatives. Taxpayers who prefer a market-based provider may therefore pay twice—once through taxes for the public provision and again for the private alternative—while the state-funded supplier is insulated from the price and quality discipline of competition.
- Regulations which place costly restrictions on firms that less wealthy firms cannot afford to implement
- Protectionism, tariffs and quotas which give firms insulation from competitive forces
- Patent misuse and copyright misuse, such as fraudulently obtaining a patent, copyright, or other form of intellectual property; or using such legal devices to gain advantage in an unrelated market
- Digital rights management which prevents owners from selling used media, as would normally be allowed by the first sale doctrine.
- Occupational licensing
- Ticket scalping

Various unfair business practices such as fraud, misrepresentation, and unconscionable contracts may be considered unfair competition, if they give one competitor an advantage over others. In the European Union, each member state must regulate unfair business practices in accordance with the principles laid down in the Unfair Commercial Practices Directive, subject to transitional periods.

== See also ==
- Anti-competitive practices of Amazon
- Anti-competitive practices of Apple Inc.
- Competition law
- Competition regulator
- Loss leader
- Market concentration
- Natural monopoly
- Network effect
- Parker immunity doctrine
- Predatory pricing
- Price discrimination
- Trade regulation law
- Embrace, extend, and extinguish
- Planned obsolescence
- Enshittification
- Category killer
- European Union competition law
- Unfair business practices
- United States antitrust law
