= Market concentration =

Term in market economics

In economics, market concentration is a function of the number of firms and their respective shares of the total production (alternatively, total capacity or total reserves) in a market. Market concentration is the portion of a given market's market share that is held by a small number of businesses. To ascertain whether an industry is competitive or not, it is employed in antitrust law land economic regulation. When market concentration is high, it indicates that a few firms dominate the market and oligopoly or monopolistic competition is likely to exist. In most cases, high market concentration produces undesirable consequences such as reduced competition and higher prices.

The market concentration ratio measures the concentration of the top firms in the market, this can be through various metrics such as sales, employment numbers, active users or other relevant indicators. In theory and in practice, market concentration is closely associated with market competitiveness, and therefore is important to various antitrust agencies when considering proposed mergers and other regulatory issues. Market concentration is important in determining firm market power in setting prices and quantities.

Market concentration is affected through various forces, including barriers to entry and existing competition. Market concentration ratios also allows users to more accurately determine the type of market structure they are observing, from a perfect competitive, to a monopolistic, monopoly or oligopolistic market structure.

Market concentration is related to industrial concentration, which concerns the distribution of production within an industry, as opposed to a market. In industrial organization, market concentration may be used as a measure of competition, theorized to be positively related to the rate of profit in the industry, for example in the work of Joe S. Bain.

An alternative economic interpretation is that market concentration is a criterion that can be used to rank order various distributions of firms' shares of the total production (alternatively, total capacity or total reserves) in a market.

== Factors affecting market concentration ==
The 2020 Australian Telecommunications firms market share: an example of a highly concentrated market with an estimated HHI of 3034.
1. Telstra (37.0%)
2. Optus (30.0%)
3. Vodafone (27.0%)
4. Other (6.00%)

There are various factors that affect the concentration of specific markets which include; barriers to entry(high start-up costs, high economies of scale, brand loyalty), industry size and age, product differentiation and current advertising levels. There are also firm specific factors affecting market concentration, including: research and development levels, and the human capital requirements.

Although fewer competitors doesn't always indicate high market concentration, it can be a strong indicator of the market structure and power allocation.

== Metrics ==
After determining the relevant market and firms, through defining the product and geographical parameters, various metrics can be employed to determine the market concentration. This can be quantified using the SSNIP test.

A simple measure of market concentration is to calculate 1/N where N is the number of firms in the market. A result of 1 would indicate a pure monopoly, and will decrease with the number of active firms in the market, and nonincreasing in the degree of symmetry between them. This measure of concentration ignores the dispersion among the firms' shares. This measure is practically useful only if a sample of firms' market shares is believed to be random, rather than determined by the firms' inherent characteristics.

Any criterion that can be used to compare or rank distributions (e.g. probability distribution, frequency distribution or size distribution) can be used as a market concentration criterion. Examples are stochastic dominance and Gini coefficient.

=== Herfindahl–Hirschman Index ===
The Herfindahl–Hirschman index (HHI) (the most commonly used market concentration) is added portion of market attentiveness. It is derived by adding the squares of all the Market participants market shares. A higher HHI indicates a higher level of market concentration. A market concentration level of less than 1000 is typically seen as low, whilst one of more than 1500 is regarded as excessive.

$H=\sum_{i=1}^N s_i^2$

Where $s_i$ is the market share of firm i, conventionally expressed as a percentage, and N is the number of firms in the relevant market.

If market shares are expressed as decimals, an HHI of 0 represents a perfectly competitive industry while an HHI index of 1 represents a monopolised industry. Regardless whether the decimal or percentage HHI is used, a higher HHI indicates higher concentration within a market.

Section 1 of the Department of Justice and the Federal Trade Commission's Horizontal Merger Guidelines is entitled "Market Definition, Measurement and Concentration" and states that the Herfindahl index is the measure of concentration that these Guidelines will use.

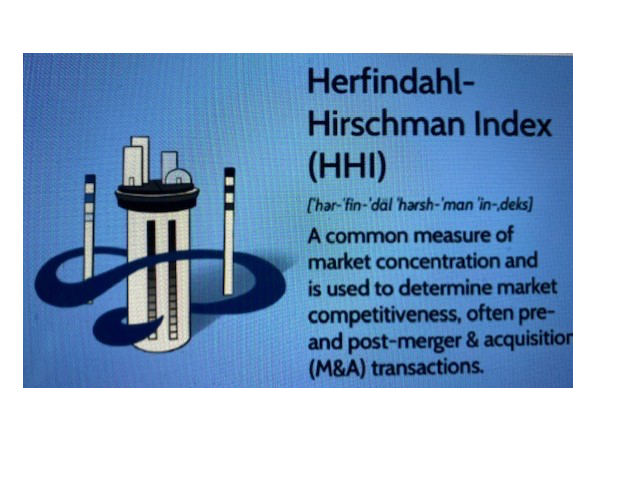
Herfindahl-Hirschman Index

=== Concentration ratio ===
The concentration ratio (CR) is a measure of how concentrated a market is. By dividing the overall market share by the sum of the market shares of the largest enterprises, it is calculated. It can be used to assess the market's strength over both the short and long haul. Generally speaking, a CR of less than 40% and a CR of more than 60% are regarded as modest and high levels of market concentration, respectively. This ratio measures the concentration of the largest firms in the form

$CR_n = C_1+C_2+.....+C_n$

where N is usually between 3 and 5.

Relationship between Market Structure and Market Concentration Metrics
Type of Market	CR Range	HHI Range
Monopoly	1	6000 - 10 000 (Depending on Region)
Oligopoly	0.5 - 1	2000 - 6000 (Depending on Region)
Competitive	0 - 0.5	0 - 2000 (Depending on Region)

== Regulatory usage ==
=== Historical usage ===
Since the introduction of the Sherman Antitrust Act of 1890, in response to growing monopolies and anti-competitive firms in the 1880s, antitrust agencies regularly use market concentration as an important metric to evaluate potential violations of competition laws. Since the passing of the act, these metrics have also been used to evaluate potential mergers' effect on overall market competition and overall consumer welfare. The first major example of the Sherman Act being imposed on a company to prevent potential consumer abuse through excessive market concentration was in the 1911 court case of Standard Oil Co. of New Jersey v. United States where after determining Standard Oil was monopolising the petroleum industry, the court-ordered remedy was the breakup into 34 smaller companies.

=== Modern usage ===
Modern regulatory bodies state that an increase in market concentration can inhibit innovation, and have detrimental effects on overall consumer welfare.

The United States Department of Justice determined that any merger that increases the HHI by more than 200 proposes a legitimate concern to antitrust laws and consumer welfare . Therefore, when considering potential mergers, especially in horizontal integration applications, antitrust agencies will consider the whether the increase in efficiency is worth the potential decrease in consumer welfare, through increased costs or reduction in quantity produced.

Whereas the European Commission is unlikely to contest any horizontal integration, which post merger HHI is under 2000 (except in special circumstances).

Modern examples of market concentration being utilised to protect consumer welfare include:

- 2014 Attempted purchase of Time Warner Cable by Comcast, was abandoned after the US DOJ threatened to file an antitrust lawsuit, citing that the HHI of the national television industry would increase by 639 points to a HHI of 2454, and feared this merger would lead to increased prices for consumers.
- Halliburton and Baker Hughes (at the time the 2nd and 3rd largest oilfield services companies, respectively) attempted 2014 merger was blocked by the US DOJ, after fears that the merger would increase costs for oil companies in 23 separate product markets, and therefore would stiffen innovation in the oil sector.
- General Electric's attempted acquisition of Honeywell in 2001, was approved in the United States, however the condition's that European Commission enforced for the approval were too impactful for General Electric, and was abandoned. This is an example on how different regulatory bodies view mergers.

== Motivation for firms ==
The relationship between market concentration and profitability can be divided into two arguments: greater market concentration increases the likelihood of collusion between firms which, resulting in higher pricing. In contrast, market concentration occurs as a result of the efficiency obtained in the course of being a large firm, which is more profitable in comparison to smaller firms and their lack of efficiency.

=== Collusion ===
There are game theoretic models of market interaction (e.g. among oligopolists) that predict that an increase in market concentration will result in higher prices and lower consumer welfare even when collusion in the sense of cartelization (i.e. explicit collusion) is absent. Examples are Cournot oligopoly, and Bertrand oligopoly for differentiated products. Bain's (1956) original concern with market concentration was based on an intuitive relationship between high concentration and collusion which led to Bain's finding that firms in concentrated markets should be earning supra-competitive profits. Collins and Preston (1969) shared a similar view to Bain with focus on the reduced competitive impact of smaller firms upon larger firms. Demsetz held an alternative view where he found a positive relationship between the margins of specifically the largest firms within a concentrated industry and collusion as to pricing.

Although theoretical models predict a strong correlation between market concentration and collusion, there is little empirical evidence linking market concentration to the level of collusion in an industry. In the scenario of a merger, some studies have also shown that the asymmetric market structure produced by a merger will negatively affect collusion despite the increased concentration of the market that occurs post-merger.

=== Efficiency ===
As an economic tool market concentration is useful because it reflects the degree of competition in the market. Understanding the market concentration is important for firms when deciding their marketing strategy. As well, empirical evidence shows that there exists an inverse relationship between market concentration and efficiency, such that firms display an increase in efficiency when their relevant market concentration decreases. The above positions of Bain (1956) as well as Collins and Preston (1969) are not only supportive of collusion but also of the efficiency-profitability hypothesis: profits are higher for bigger firms within a greater concentrated market as this concentration signifies greater efficiency through mass production. In particular, economies of scale was the greatest kind of efficiency that large firms could achieve in influencing their costs, granting them greater market share. Notably however, Rosenbaum (1994) observed that most studies assumed the relationship between actual market share and observed profitability by following the implication that large firms hold greater market share due to their efficiency, demonstrating that the relationship between these efficiency and market share is not clearly defined.

== Implications of market concentration ==
A high level of market concentration can lead to a decrease in competition and increased market power for the dominant firms. This might lead to greater costs, less quality, fewer options, and less innovation. Thus, consumers and society may be negatively impacted by large levels of market concentration.

=== Innovation ===
Schumpeter (1950) first recognised the relationship between market concentration and innovation in that a higher concentrated market would facilitate innovation. He reasoned that firms with the greatest market share have the greatest opportunity to benefit from their innovations, particularly through investment into R&D. This can be contrasted with the position taken by Arrow (1962) that a greater market concentration will decrease incentive to innovate because a firm within a monopoly or monopolistic market would have already reached profit levels that greatly exceed costs.

In practice, there are complications in observing the direct correlation between market concentration and its effect on. In collecting empirical evidence, issues have also arisen as to how innovation, a firm's control and gaps between R&D and firm size are measured. There has also been a lack of consensus. For example, a negative correlation was established by Connelly and Hirschey (1984) who explained that the correlation evidenced a decreased expenditure on R&D by oligopolistic firms to benefit from greater monopolised profits. However, Blundell et al. observed a positive correlation by tallying the patents lodged by firms. This general observation was also shared by Aghion et al. in 2005.

Schumpeter also failed to distinguish between the different technologies that contribute to innovation and did not properly define “creative destruction”. Petit and Teece (2021) argued that technological opportunities, a variable which Schumpeter and Arrow did not include during their time, would be included in this definition as it enables new entrants to make a “breakthrough” into the industry.

Research presented by Aghion et al. (2005) suggested an inverted U-shape model that represents the relationship between market concentration and innovation. Delbono and Lambertini modelled empirical evidence onto a graph and found that the pattern demonstrated by the data supported the existence of a U-shaped relationship between these two variables.

==== Regulation of market concentration ====
The existence of economic regulations like the Competition Act and antitrust laws like the Sherman Act is due to the necessity of maintaining market competition in order to avoid the formation of monopolies. These laws typically require firms to report their market share and limit the degree of market concentration that is allowed. In some cases, antitrust laws may require the breakup of firms or the establishment of “firewalls” that prevent the potential abuse of power.

Market concentration reveals a market's degree of concentration. It is employed to ascertain the level of industrial competition. A high degree of market concentration is typically undesirable since it might result in less competition and more power for the leading enterprises on the market. Antitrust laws and other economic regulations safeguard market competition and the avoidance of monopolies.

== Alternative metrics ==
Although not as common as the Herfindahl–Hirschman Index or Concentration Ratio metrics, various alternative measures of market concentration can also be used.

(a) The U Index (Davies, 1980):

$U = I^{*a}N^{-1}$, where $I^{*}$ is an accepted measure of inequality (in practice the coefficient of variation is suggested), $a$ is a constant or a parameter (to be estimated empirically) and N is the number of firms. Davies (1979) suggests that a concentration index should in general depend on both N and the inequality of firms' shares. Davis (1980) indicates, there are many suitable candidates to be used for $I^{*}$, however, the measure he advocates "is a simple transformation of the coefficient of variation (c): $I^{*} = 1 + c^2$.
The "number of effective competitors" is the inverse of the Herfindahl index.
Terrence Kavyu Muthoka defines distribution just as functionals in the Swartz space which is the space of functions with compact support and with all derivatives existing. The Media:Dirac_Distribution or the Dirac function is a good example.

(b) The Linda index (1976)

$$L=\frac 1 {N(N-1)}\sum_{i=1}^{N-1}Q_i\left [ \frac{n-i}{i} \right ]\left \vert \frac{CR_i}{CR_n-CR_i} \right \vert$$
where Q_{i} is the ratio between the average share of the first $i$ firms and the average share of the remaining $N - i$ firms and $CR_i$ is the concentration coefficient for the first $i$ firms. Although it doesn't capture the peripheral firms like the HHI formula, it works to capture the "core" of the market, and measure the degree of inequality between the size variable accounted for by various sib-samples of firms. This index does assume pre-calculation on the users' behalf to determine the relevant value of $CR_i$ However, there is little empirical evidence of regulatory usage of the Linda Index.

(c) Comprehensive concentration index (Horwath 1970):

$$CCI = s_1 + \sum_{i=2}^N s_i^2(2 - s_i)$$
Where s_{1} is the share of the largest firm. The index is similar to $2\text{H} - \sum s_i^3$ except that greater weight is assigned to the share of the largest firm. When compared to the HHI index, it does present some advantages, such as giving more weight to the quantity of small firms, however the arbitrary choice to only include the absolute value of one firm has led to criticism over its accuracy and usefulness.

(d) The Rosenbluth (1961) index (also Hall and Tideman, 1967):

$R = \frac{1}{2\sum is_i - 1}$ where symbol i indicates the firm's rank position.
The Rosenbluth index assigns more weight to smaller competitors when there are more firms present in the marketplace, and is sensitive to the amount of competitors in the market, even if there is a small amount of large firms dominating. Its coefficients and ranking are similar to results produced through the use of the Herfindahl-Hirschman Index.

(e) The Gini coefficient (1912)

$$G = 1 - \sum_{i=1}^N S_i\frac{(2i-1)}{N}$$
The Gini coefficient measures the difference between firms' sizes without including the number of firms operating in a market. This is known as a relative concentration measure and differs from absolute concentration measures (like the Rosenbluth index) which includes the number of firms and firms' distribution sizes. It is used in conjunction with the Lorenz curve. Originally, the Lorenz curve measured the inequality of income distributed with a population and ranked individuals from highest to lowest earnings. Therefore, in this context the Gini coefficient is located between the 45° line representing an equal distribution of income and the Lorenz curve representing the actual distribution of income within the population. In a market concentration context, the Lorenz curve can be plotted ranking firms' market shares from smallest to largest to simulate a concentration curve. The firms’ cumulative percentage shares would remain on the y axis and the cumulative percentage of sellers would remain on the x axis. $\frac{(2i-1)}{N}$ would the sum of weighted market share located in the area above the concentration curve. The Gini coefficient is 0 when the concentration curve aligns with the 45° line representing a single firm's market share, meaning the market is a monopoly.

(f) Utilizing the power-law exponent (α) of the fitting curve on the out-degree distribution of the network (Pliatsidis, 2024)

For a given set of nodes, each with degree k, the power-law exponent (α) serves as a pivotal metric for analyzing concentration within a network. This exponent characterizes the distribution of out-degrees among nodes, offering insights into the concentration of certain attributes or interactions within the system.

When α<0, a skewed distribution emerges where a small percentage of firms dominate the market.

As α approaches 0, the distribution flattens, indicating a more equitable distribution of contract awards.

Conversely, as α increases above 0, the concentration among a select few firms diminishes further, suggesting a diversified market landscape.

== See also ==
- Concentration ratio
- CVS Health, a U.S. pharmacy chain, which owns CVS Pharmacy, and CVS Caremark, a prescription benefit management subsidiary
- Dominance (economics)
- Gini coefficient
- Herfindahl index
- Horizontal Merger Guidelines
- Lorenz curve
- Inequality of wealth
- Market failure
- Monopoly
- Probability distribution
- Stochastic dominance
- Relative market share
