= Merger control =

Merger control refers to the procedure of reviewing mergers and acquisitions under antitrust / competition law. Over 130 nations worldwide have adopted a regime providing for merger control. National or supernational competition agencies such as the EU European Commission, the UK Competition and Markets Authority, or the US Department of Justice or Federal Trade Commission are normally entrusted with the role of reviewing mergers.

Merger control regimes are adopted to prevent anti-competitive consequences of concentrations (as mergers and acquisitions are also known). Accordingly, most merger control regimes normally provide for one of the following substantive tests:

- Does the concentration significantly impede effective competition? (EU, Germany)
- Does the concentration substantially lessen competition? (US, UK)
- Does the concentration lead to the creation or strengthening of a dominant position? (Switzerland, Russia)

In practice most merger control regimes are based on very similar underlying principles. In simple terms, the creation of a dominant position would usually result in a substantial lessening of or significant impediment to effective competition.

The large majority of modern merger control regimes are of an ex-ante nature, i.e. the reviewing authorities carry out their assessment before the transaction is implemented.

While it is indisputable that a concentration may lead to a reduction in output and result in higher prices and thus in a welfare loss to consumers, the antitrust authority faces the challenge of applying various economic theories and rules in a legally binding procedure.

== Horizontal mergers ==
The vast majority of significant competition issues associated with mergers arises in horizontal mergers. A horizontal merger is one between parties that are competitors at the same level of production and/or distribution of a good or service, i.e., in the same relevant market.

There are two types of anticompetitive effects associated with horizontal mergers: unilateral effects and coordinated effects.

Unilateral effects, also known as non-coordinated effects, arise where, as a result of the merger, competition between the products of the merging firms is eliminated, allowing the merged entity to unilaterally exercise market power, for instance by profitably raising the price of one or both merging parties’ products, thus harming consumers.

In homogeneous markets, unilateral effects can be pronounced when two significant competitors merge to create a large, dominant player with only a few or no other competitors. In these markets, an important role in the assessment is played by market shares and by the capacity available in the market. In differentiated markets, unilateral effects tend to arise particularly when the two merging companies have highly substitutable goods. Such a price increase does not depend on the merged firm being the dominant player in the market. The likelihood and magnitude of such an increase will instead depend on the substitutability of the products supplied by the two firms – the closer the substitute, the greater the unilateral effects.

Coordinated effects arise where, under certain market conditions (e.g., market transparency, product homogeneity etc.), the merger increases the probability that, post merger, merging parties and their competitors will successfully be able to coordinate their behaviour in an anti-competitive way, for example, by raising prices. As in the case of unilateral effects, the most common form of coordinated effects is in the case of horizontal mergers, i.e. mergers between firms active on the same market.

The main question in analysing coordinated effects should be whether the merger materially increases the likelihood that firms in the market will successfully coordinate their behaviour or strengthen existing coordination. The task is to identify what factors are likely to lead to coordination taking place between firms post-merger. This was a controversial area with which competition authorities and courts have struggled to come to terms over the years, but experience has led to the emergence of some agreement on what conditions are most likely to give rise to coordinated effects.

Under the European Union merger control regime, in order for coordinated effects to arise the so-called "Airtours criteria" have to be fulfilled.

According to the "Airtours criteria", coordination is more likely to emerge in markets where it is relatively simple to reach a common understanding on the terms of coordination. In addition, three conditions are necessary for coordination to be sustainable. First, the coordinating firms must be able to monitor to a sufficient degree whether the terms of coordination are being adhered to. Second, discipline requires that there is some form of credible deterrent mechanism that can be activated if deviation is detected. Third, the reactions of outsiders, such as current and future competitors not participating in the coordination, as well as customers, should not be able to jeopardise the results expected from the coordination.

== Non-horizontal mergers ==
There are two basic forms of non-horizontal mergers: vertical mergers and conglomerate mergers.

Vertical mergers are mergers between firms that operate at different but complementary levels in the chain of production (e.g., manufacturing and an upstream market for an input) and/or distribution (e.g., manufacturing and a downstream market for re-sale to retailers) of the same final product. In purely vertical mergers there is no direct loss in competition as in horizontal mergers because the parties' products did not compete in the same relevant market. As such, there is no change in the level of concentration in either relevant market. Vertical mergers have significant potential to create efficiencies largely because the upstream and downstream products or services complement each other. Even so, vertical integration may sometimes give rise to competition concerns.

Vertical effects can produce competitive harm in the form of foreclosure. A merger is said to result in foreclosure where actual or potential rivals' access to supplies or markets is hampered or eliminated as a result of the merger, thereby reducing these companies' ability and/or incentive to compete.

Two forms of foreclosure can be distinguished. The first is where the merger is likely to raise the costs of downstream rivals by restricting their access to an important input (input foreclosure). The second is where the merger is likely to foreclose upstream rivals by restricting their access to a sufficient customer base (customer foreclosure).

In general, vertical merger concerns are likely to arise only if market power already exists in one or more markets along the supply chain.

Conglomerate mergers involve firms that operate in different product markets, without a vertical relationship. They may be product extension mergers, i.e., mergers between firms that produce different but related products or pure conglomerate mergers, i.e., mergers between firms operating in entirely different markets. In practice, the focus is on mergers between companies that are active in related or neighbouring markets, e.g., mergers involving suppliers of complementary products or of products belonging to a range of products that is generally sold to the same set of customers in a manner that lessens competition.

Merger review in this area is controversial, as commentators and enforcement agencies disagree on the extent to which one can predict competitive harm resulting from such mergers. Such a disagreement is for instance illustrated by the different outcomes of the merger control reviews by the authorities of the United States and the European Union of the GE/Honeywell merger attempt.

Proponents of conglomerate theories of harm argue that in a small number of cases, where the parties to the merger have strong market positions in their respective markets, potential harm may arise when the merging group is likely to foreclose other rivals from the market in a way similar to vertical mergers, particularly by means of tying and bundling their products. When as a result of foreclosure rival companies become less effective competitors, consumer harm may result.

However, it should be stressed that in these cases there is a real risk of foregoing efficiency gains that benefits consumer welfare and thus the theory of competitive harm needs to be supported by substantial evidence.

== Mandatory and voluntary regimes ==
A merger control regime is described as "mandatory" when filing of a transaction is compulsory. Mandatory regimes normally also contain a so-called "suspensory clause", which implies that the parties to a transaction are indefinitely prevented from closing the deal until they have received merger clearance. The majority of merger jurisdictions worldwide have mandatory merger control systems. An examples of a mandatory system with suspensory clause is provided by the European Union merger control.

A distinction can also be made between "local" and "global" bars on closing/implementation; some mandatory regimes provide that the transaction cannot be implemented within the particular jurisdiction (local bar on closing) and some provide that the transaction cannot be closed/implemented anywhere in the world prior to merger clearance (global bar on closing). A number of jurisdictions worldwide have a merger control regime which imposes a global bar on closing. This creates obstacles for the parties to a concentration to close a transaction until a number of the regulatory clearances required are obtained.

A merger control regime is described as "voluntary" when the parties are not prevented from closing the deal and implementing the transaction in advance of having applied for and received merger clearance. In these circumstances the merging parties are effectively taking the risk that the competition authority will not require them to undo the deal if in due course it is found that the transaction is likely to have an anti-competitive effect. Voluntary regimes are fairly exceptional. The United Kingdom, for instance, has a voluntary merger control regime. However, the Competition and Markets Authority can request the parties to a merger that has already completed to hold the two businesses separate pending an investigation (so called "initial enforcement orders").

Mandatory regimes can be considered effective in preventing anticompetitive concentrations since it is almost impossible to unravel a merger once it has been implemented (for example because key staff have been made redundant, assets have been sold and information has been exchanged). On the other hand, voluntary regimes are seen as constituting less of a burden for merging firms.

== See also ==
- Regulatory economics
- Guidelines on the assessment of horizontal mergers under the Council Regulation on the control of concentrations between undertakings
- US Horizontal Merger Guidelines
- Competition Law
- SSNIP
