= European Union merger law =

European Union merger law is a part of the law of the European Union. It is charged with regulating mergers between two or more entities in a corporate structure. This institution has jurisdiction over concentrations that might or might not impede competition. Although mergers must comply with policies and regulations set by the commission, certain mergers are exempt if they promote consumer welfare. Mergers that fail to comply with the common market may be blocked. It is part of competition law and is designed to ensure that firms do not acquire such a degree of market power on the free market so as to harm the interests of consumers, the economy and society as a whole. Specifically, the level of control may lead to higher prices, less innovation and production.

Mergers and acquisitions are regulated by competition laws because they may concentrate economic power in the hands of a smaller number of parties. Oversight by the European Union, the competition laws have been enacted under the Directive 2005/56/EC on Cross-border mergers and the Economic Concentration Regulation 139/2004, known as the "EUMR". The law requires that firms proposing to merge apply for prior approval from the Commission. The European Commission (EC) has exclusive competence over concentrations that meet certain thresholds. This is known as community dimension. A concentration with a turnover of the following will trigger commission jurisdiction. Mergers that transcend national borders, have an annual turnover of the combined business that exceeds a worldwide turnover of over EUR 5000 million, and Community-wide turnover of over EUR 250 million must notify and be examined by the European Commission. Merger regulation thus involves predicting potential market conditions which would pertain after the merger. The standard set by the law is whether a combination would "significantly impede effective competition... in particular as a result of the creation or strengthening of a dominant position..."

One reason why businesses may be motivated to merge is to reduce the transaction costs of negotiating bilateral contracts. Another is to take advantage of increased economies of scale. However, increased market share and size may also increase market power, strengthening the negotiating position of the business. This is good for the firm, but can be bad for competitors and downstream entities (such as distributors or consumers). A monopoly is the most extreme case, where prices might be raised to the monopoly price instead of the lower competitive equilibrium price. An oligopoly is another potentially undesirable situation in which limited competition may allow higher prices than a market with more participants.

== Concentration ==
Under EU law, a concentration exists when a...

"change of control on a lasting basis results from (a) the merger of two or more previously independent undertakings... (b) the acquisition... if direct or indirect control of the whole or parts of one or more other undertakings." Art. 3(1), Regulation 139/2004, the European Community Merger Regulation

This usually means that one firm buys out the shares of another. The reasons for oversight of economic concentrations by the state are the same as the reasons to restrict firms who abuse a position of dominance, only that regulation of mergers and acquisitions attempts to deal with the problem before it arises, ex ante prevention of creating dominant firms. In the case of [T-102/96] Gencor Ltd v. Commission [1999] ECR II-753, the concentration between the two companies were regarded as incompatible with the EU Merger Control regulations.

The EU Court of First Instance wrote that merger control is there "to avoid the establishment of market structures which may create or strengthen a dominant position and not need to control directly possible abuses of dominant positions." Based on the Court of First Instance (CFI) comment, the court ruled that it is within the commission's competence to block or accept mergers that exercise production outside Europe[1]. In other words, the commission was able to annul the proposed merger because a concentration that transpires overseas may also be held to account. Beyond outright mergers and share acquisitions, the EUMR also catches the creation of full-function joint ventures, defined as joint ventures that perform on a lasting basis all the functions of an autonomous economic entity and operate independently in the relevant market. A joint venture that merely serves as a production or service vehicle for its parent companies does not constitute a concentration within the meaning of Article 3 EUMR and therefore does not require Commission notification. This distinction was clarified definitively by the Court of Justice in Case C-248/16 (Austria Asphalt, 2017), which held that a concentration exists only where a jointly controlled undertaking is full-function, regardless of whether it is a newly created entity or a pre-existing one.. Control under the EUMR can be held on a de facto basis without share ownership: a party may exercise joint control through contractual veto rights over the strategic decisions of a joint venture, as set out in the Commission's Notice on the concept of concentration. In Airtours v Commission, the CFI annulled the commission's decision and allowed the application to take effect on the grounds of insufficient claims. The commission was unable to prove coordination between the undertakings for collective dominance.

== Significantly impeding effective competition ==
Prior to the implementation of Regulation 139/2004 and the turn towards a more effects-based approach to EU competition law, EU merger control was governed by EEC Regulation 4064/89. Originally, there was no merger control in the 1957 Treaty of Rome. In 1973, the Commission proposed to adopt a merger regulation, which was eventually adopted in 1989 after a long battle between commissioner Leon Brittan, and two member-states which were the most reluctant (but for different reasons): Germany and Britain. Under EEC Regulation 4064/89 (the 'old' regulation), a merger or concentration was prohibited if it would

"create or strengthen a dominant position as a result of which effective competition would significantly impeded".

The old substantive test is said to have encouraged two alternative interpretations of how to apply the test. The alternative interpretations suggest that the presence of dominance alone is a sufficient condition to satisfy the dominance test, and that as part of a two-tier test, dominance is a necessary condition to satisfy before considering the dynamics of competition between the parties merging and the competitive characteristics of the market following the notification of a merger. The commission's role in applying merger control in this area of law was limited. The limit has set out that the "creation or strengthening" of a dominance position may only trigger commission jurisdiction. The effectiveness of the old "dominance test" increasingly began to be called into question with concerns regarding the issues of over-enforcement and the false positives. The concern behind the dominance test was the narrow interpretation of the old law.

The case of Airtours v Commission in 2002 served as the case that ultimately urged the Commission to recommend a change in EU merger regulation. The Commission prohibited the merger of Airtours and First Choice on the basis that it would create a collective dominant position in the market since there would be an incentive for the remaining firms in an oligopolistic market to restrict market capacity, leading to higher prices and increased profits as a result of subsequent market conditions following the merger. The oligopolists need not always "behave as if there were one or more explicit agreements between them." The Commission believed it was "sufficient that the merger makes it rational for the oligopolists...to act individually in ways which will substantially reduce competition between them."

In the case of Airtours v Commission, the Court of First Instance annulled the Commission's decision to prohibit the Airtours-First Choice merger on the grounds that the Commission's interpretation of collective dominance was not informed by the widely recognised indicator of anti-competitive behaviour in an oligopolistic market - tacit collusion. The Airtours legal action created a significant level of uncertainty in EU merger law as a perceived gap had arisen with the law at the time - the gap of the non-collusive oligopoly.

In response to the concerns raised regarding the "dominance test" and the non-collusive oligopoly gap in EU merger regulation, the European Council adopted Regulation 139/2004. Under Council (EC) Regulation 139/2004, a merger or concentration

"which would significantly impede effective competition, in the common market or in a substantial part of it, in particular as a result of the creation or strengthening of a dominant position, shall be declared incompatible with the common market".

Many commentators have commented on the need to create a new test. Legal academic Richard Whish described the EUMR of 2004 as "disarmingly simple", in that the 'dominance test' remains but the question posed by the test is reversed. The new test, most commonly known as the 'SIEC' (significant impediment to effective competition) test, was employed to tackle the inefficiencies of the "dominance test" that mainly stemmed from the wording of the test and the prerequisite of an undertaking assuming a dominant position or the strengthening a dominant position in the market. The fundamental change here is the broadening of the old test interpretation. The SIEC test was able to fill the void by extending the application of merger control to non-dominant undertakings.

The new 'SIEC' test is a reorganisation of the "dominance test" that eliminates "dominance" as a necessary requirement for SIEC and instead expresses SIEC as the single and sufficient condition for incompatibility with EU merger regulation. The proposed change in the law was to ensure that activities that lead to a negative effect on the consumer's welfare would be held liable at law. The dominance element was avoided by asserting the SIEC test to ensure the competitive structure of the common market was held to a certain standard. What amounts to a substantial lessening of, or significant impediment to competition is usually answered through empirical study. The market shares of the merging companies can be assessed and added, although this kind of analysis only gives rise to presumptions, not conclusions. The new test focuses on the subsequent changes to competition in a market following a merger, rather than whether the merged undertaking has acquired an excessive level of market power.

The effects-based approach of the 'SIEC' test allows the Commission to test for the possibly harmful effects of a merger on market competition without dismissing the efficiencies that may come about as a result of a merged entity using its dominant position in the market and economies of scale to reduce prices, increase innovation and increase consumer welfare. The "dominance test" would deem all mergers incompatible with the common market on the sole condition of dominance.

Due to the wording of the new 'SIEC' test, efficiency defences are now allowed, in principle, as the focus on SIEC as opposed to dominance, means that a dominant merged entity will be able to argue the case for the merger on the grounds of increased consumer benefits, when applicable. However, from the 'SEIC' test's inception in 2004 to 2014 only a handful of petitioners argued the case for a merger using the efficiency defence, which could be due to the feelings that the defence of efficiency may signal weakness in the rest of the case for a merger. The 'SIEC' test set out to address the inefficiencies of the "dominance test", however, there has arguably been no radical change to the manner in which the Commission assesses merger but there is evidence to suggest that the Commission is moving towards focusing on the relevant market characteristics that are consistent with effects-based analysis of market competition.

What amounts to a substantial lessening of, or significant impediment to competition is usually answered through empirical study. The market shares of the merging companies can be assessed and added, although this kind of analysis only gives rise to presumptions, not conclusions. The Herfindahl-Hirschman Index is used to calculate the "density" of the market, or what concentration exists. Aside from the maths, it is important to consider the product in question and the rate of technical innovation in the market. A further problem of collective dominance, or oligopoly through "economic links" can arise, whereby the new market becomes more conducive to collusion. It is relevant how transparent a market is, because a more concentrated structure could mean firms can coordinate their behaviour more easily, whether firms can deploy deterrents and whether firms are safe from a reaction by their competitors and consumers. The entry of new firms to the market, and any barriers that they might encounter should be considered.

== Brexit ==
The effect of Brexit on merger control is unclear considering the uncertainty behind Brexit said Andrea Coscelli, the acting chief of the Competition and Markets Authority (CMA). British experts from White & Case LLP and Richard Ecclyes have argued that, beyond control over domestic affairs, there will be a considerable increase in the amount of workload. The CMA has predicted that there will be a 75% increase of workload in terms of reviews and merger cases. Thus, the implications of the Brexit will depend on a withdrawal agreement or no-deal Brexit. The Withdrawal agreement will give the CMA a transition period where EUMR cases are reviewed by the European Commission and the UK turnover, as a result of those reviews, shall be calculated until the period comes to an end. A no-deal Brexit will amount to a complete divorce between the European Union and the United Kingdom. The CMA will have to exercise its affairs independently as of exit day.

== Exceptions ==
Firms who are engaged in a prima facie uncompetitive concentration may be able to show that their action nevertheless results in "technical and economic progress" mentioned in Art. 2(1) of the ECMR as the focus of the analysis is on whether the concentration results in an overall impediment to effective competition, described as an "effects based equilibrium approach". "Technical and economic progress", being a desirable effect on the market, will thus be accounted for in an assessment on whether the competitive equilibrium of the market will be positively or adversely affected by the proposed merger. The economic progress exceptions, as the name suggests, could potentially be used to eliminate the anti-competitive effects, however, it is not binding at law. The burden of proof rests on the undertakings pleading the defense but the discretion ultimately rests on the European Commission.

The Commission has published, as per Recital 29 of the ECMR, guidelines outlining the circumstances when economic efficiency might be factored into the assessment of whether a significant impediment to effective competition is present, such circumstances include whether a benefit has been produced to consumers, whether the benefit is a specific direct result of the merger and whether the benefit is verifiable and likely to materialise. Economic efficiency benefits were considered at great length by the Commission in UPS/TNT Express but ultimately it was concluded that a significant impediment to effective competition was still present even with the claimed efficiencies taken into account. The defense presented by the commission, as the "efficiency analysis" will be taken into account in assessing whether the concentration is of pro-competitive nature[1]. However, the notion that such a defense may argue otherwise is not accurate. In other words, the European Union Merger Law is more considered about the competitive structure of the market than its economic welfare. Therefore, applying the "efficiency analysis" will evidently weaken the undertakings concerned application. A research data collection conducted by Alto University substantiates those assertions by stating that only 24 applicants have pleaded the efficiency argument since the legislation was put into effect.

Another defence might be that a firm which is being taken over is about to fail or go insolvent, and taking it over leaves a no less competitive state than what would happen anyway. This was the case when the Commission considered the proposed acquisition of Shell's Harburg refinery by Nynas in Nynas/Shell/Harburg Refinery and it accepted that the likely result of the merger not going ahead would be the closure of the refinery, thus the acquisition was allowed.

Mergers vertically in the market are rarely of concern, although in AOL/Time Warner the European Commission required that a joint venture with a competitor Bertelsmann be ceased beforehand. The EU authorities have also focussed lately on the effect of conglomerate mergers, where companies acquire a large portfolio of related products, though without necessarily dominant shares in any individual market.

== Criticism ==
EU authorities' application of merger law in practice has been criticized for acting for protectionist reasons rather than sound economic reasons. The EU is concerned with a long term competitive structure as opposed to a short-term economic benefit. Various intuitions such as the United States Anti-trust would sometimes outweigh the economic benefits against the anti-competitive nature of the merger. There is communication between the European Commission and overseas institutions in regards to competition law.

For example, the EU blocked a proposed merger of General Electric and Honeywell on grounds of the possibility of "leverage" in other markets and "portfolio effects", even though United States regulators found that the merger would improve competition and reduce prices. Assistant Attorney General Charles James, along with a number of academics, called the EU's use of "portfolio effects" to protect competitors, rather than competition, "antithetical to the goals of antitrust law enforcement." United States Secretary of the Treasury Paul O'Neill called the rejection of the GE-Honeywell merger "off the wall" and complained of European Union regulators "They are the closest thing you can find to an autocratic organization that can successfully impose their will on things that one would think are outside their scope of attention." President Bush was "concerned" in regards to the European Commissions intention to block the billion-dollar concentration. However, Monti, the European Commissioner at the time, called the United States concerns political and out of bounds.

Similar concerns were echoed by Australian industrial policy advocates when a change to its merger regulation was considered. It was argued that focusing on a "substantial lessening of competition" as opposed to market dominance might "obstruct mergers unnecessarily", restrict the capacity of Australian companies to "compete effectively in the global marketplace" and that an intrusive merger policy might "hamper the growth of national industry". Despite the fact that GE and Honeywell are American companies, the effect of that merger could have a negative impact on Europe's competition market. Bearing in mind that thousands of the companies employees are situated in Europe with a turnover that reach up to billions of dollars on a yearly bases (Even though, concentrations that might so happen overseas, the effect of those concentrations were tangible in Europe) In effect, the European Commission has every right to block those kinds of concentrations.

A report commissioned by the EU however recommended that the law be expanded to also include acquisitions of minority shareholdings even when such an acquisition might not result in the transfer of control to the purchasing firm. The current regulation addresses only concentrations, which require that the acquisition results in the control of one firm by another, leaving the current regulation unable to address any adverse effects of non-controlling acquisitions on competition, many of which might be similar to the effects as a result of acquisitions resulting in control.

The Commission suggested that where one firm has influence and voting rights over another then that firm can "limit the competitive strategies available to the target, thereby weakening it as a competitive force". The example given is the proposed merger between Ryanair and Aer Lingus which would have resulted in Ryanair acquiring control, the proposal was blocked by the Commission on the basis that competition on a number of routes could have been harmed by Ryanair's strengthened dominant position. However, the Commission was not able to examine the potentially harmful competitive effects of the existing minority shareholding in Aer Lingus owned by Ryanair despite the British National Competition Authorities being free to do so.
