= Subsidiary =

Company owned or controlled by another company

A subsidiary, subsidiary company, or daughter company is a company completely or partially owned or controlled by another company, called the parent company or holding company, which has legal and financial control over the subsidiary company. Unlike regional branches or divisions, subsidiaries are considered to be distinct entities from their parent companies; they are required to follow the laws of where they are incorporated, and they maintain their own executive leadership. Two or more subsidiaries primarily controlled by the same entity/group are considered to be sister companies of each other.

Subsidiaries are a common feature of modern business, and most multinational corporations organize their operations via the creation and purchase of subsidiary companies. Examples of holding companies are Berkshire Hathaway, Jefferies Financial Group, Bentley Motors Limited, the Walt Disney Company, Warner Bros. Discovery, and Citigroup, which have subsidiaries involved in many different fields. More focused companies include IBM, Xerox, and Microsoft; they and their subsidiaries primarily operate within the tech sector. These, and others, organize their businesses into national and functional subsidiaries, often with multiple levels of subsidiaries.

== Details ==
Subsidiaries are separate, distinct legal entities for the purposes of taxation, regulation and liability. For this reason, they differ from divisions which are businesses fully integrated within the main company, and not legally or otherwise distinct from it. In other words, a subsidiary can sue and be sued separately from its parent and its obligations will not normally be the obligations of its parent. However, creditors of an insolvent subsidiary may be able to obtain a judgment against the parent if they can pierce the corporate veil and prove that the parent and subsidiary are mere alter egos of one another. Thus any copyrights, trademarks, and patents remain with the subsidiary until the parent shuts down the subsidiary.

Ownership of a subsidiary is usually achieved by owning a majority of its shares. This gives the parent the necessary votes to elect their nominees as directors of the subsidiary, and so exercise control. This gives rise to the common presumption that 50% plus one share is enough to create a subsidiary. There are, however, other ways that control can come about, and the exact rules both as to what control is needed, and how it is achieved, can be complex (see below). A subsidiary may itself have subsidiaries, and these, in turn, may have subsidiaries of their own. A parent and all its subsidiaries together are called a corporate, although this term can also apply to cooperating companies and their subsidiaries with varying degrees of shared ownership.

A parent company does not have to be the larger or "more powerful" entity; it is possible for the parent company to be smaller than a subsidiary, such as DanJaq, a closely held family company, which controls Eon Productions, the large corporation which manages the James Bond franchise. Conversely, the parent may be larger than some or all of its subsidiaries (if it has more than one), as the relationship is defined by control of ownership shares, not the number of employees.

The parent and the subsidiary do not necessarily have to operate in the same locations or operate the same businesses. Not only is it possible that they could conceivably be competitors in the marketplace, but such arrangements happen frequently at the end of a hostile takeover or voluntary merger. Also, because a parent company and a subsidiary are separate entities, it is entirely possible for one of them to be involved in legal proceedings, bankruptcy, tax delinquency, indictment or under investigation while the other is not.

== Tiered subsidiaries ==
In descriptions of larger corporate structures, the terms "first-tier subsidiary", "second-tier subsidiary", "third-tier subsidiary", etc. describe multiple levels of subsidiaries. A first-tier subsidiary is a subsidiary/child company of the ultimate parent company, (Note: As with human family trees, each level above one level is the parent of the level below, so the term "parent company" in itself does not necessarily refer to the company at the top of the tree, so here "ultimate parent company" has been used for that.) while a second-tier subsidiary is a subsidiary of a first-tier subsidiary: a "grandchild" of the main parent company. Consequently, a third-tier subsidiary is a subsidiary of a second-tier subsidiary—a "great-grandchild" of the main parent company.

The ownership structure of the small British specialist company Ford Component Sales, which sells Ford components to specialist car manufacturers and OEM manufacturers, such as Morgan Motor Company and Caterham Cars, illustrates how multiple levels of subsidiaries are used in large corporations:

- Ford Motor Company – American parent company based in Dearborn, Michigan
  - Ford International Capital LLC – First-tier subsidiary (American holding company located in Dearborn, Michigan, but registered in Delaware)
    - Ford Technologies Limited – Second-tier subsidiary (British holding company, located at the Ford UK head office in Brentwood, Essex, with five employees)
      - Ford Motor Company Limited – Third-tier subsidiary (the main British Ford company, with head office in Brentwood, with 10,500 employees)

== Control ==
=== General ===
The word "control" and its derivatives (subsidiary and parent) may have different meanings in different contexts. These concepts may have different meanings in various areas of law (e.g. corporate law, competition law, capital markets law) or in accounting. For example, if Company A purchases shares in Company B, it is possible that the transaction is not subject to merger control (because Company A had been deemed to already control Company B before the share purchase, under competition law rules), but at the same time Company A may be required to start consolidating Company B into its financial statements under the relevant accounting rules (because it had been treated as a joint venture before the purchase for accounting purposes).

Control can be direct (e.g., an ultimate parent company controls the first-tier subsidiary directly) or indirect (e.g., an ultimate parent company controls second and lower tiers of subsidiaries indirectly, through first-tier subsidiaries).

=== European Union ===
Recital 31 of Directive 2013/34/EU stipulates that control should be based on holding a majority of voting rights, but control may also exist where there are agreements with fellow shareholders or members. In certain circumstances, control may be effectively exercised where the parent holds a minority or none of the shares in the subsidiary.

According to Article 22 of Directive 2013/34/EU, an undertaking is a parent if it:

- has a majority of the shareholders' or members' voting rights in another undertaking (a subsidiary undertaking);
- has the right to appoint or remove a majority of the members of the administrative, management or supervisory body of another undertaking (a subsidiary undertaking) and is at the same time a shareholder in or member of that undertaking;
- has the right to exercise a dominant influence over an undertaking (a subsidiary undertaking) of which it is a shareholder or member, pursuant to a contract entered into with that undertaking or to a provision in its memorandum or articles of association, where the law governing that subsidiary undertaking permits its being subject to such contracts or provisions.
- is a shareholder in or member of an undertaking, and:
  - a majority of the members of the administrative, management or supervisory bodies of that undertaking (a subsidiary undertaking) who have held office during the financial year, during the preceding financial year and up to the time when the consolidated financial statements are drawn up, have been appointed solely as a result of the exercise of its voting rights; or
  - controls alone, pursuant to an agreement with other shareholders in or members of that undertaking (a subsidiary undertaking), a majority of shareholders' or members' voting rights in that undertaking.

Additionally, control may arise when:

- a parent undertaking has the power to exercise, or actually exercises, dominant influence or control over another undertaking (the subsidiary undertaking); or
- a parent undertaking and another undertaking (the subsidiary undertaking) are managed on a unified basis by the parent undertaking.

Under the international accounting standards adopted by the EU, a company is deemed to control another company only if it has all the following:

- power over the other company;
- exposure, or rights, to variable returns from its involvement with the other company; and
- the ability to use its power over the other company to affect the number of the company's returns (IFRS 10 para 7). Power generally arises when the parent has rights that give it the ability to direct the relevant activities, i.e. the activities that significantly affect the other subsidiary's returns.

A subsidiary can have only one parent; otherwise, the subsidiary is, in fact, a joint arrangement (joint operation or joint venture) over which two or more parties have joint control (IFRS 11 para 4). Joint control is the contractually agreed sharing of control of an arrangement, which exists only when decisions about the relevant activities require the unanimous consent of the parties sharing control.

=== United Kingdom ===
The Companies Act 2006 contains two definitions: one of "subsidiary" and the other "subsidiary undertaking".

According to s.1159 of the Act, a company is a "subsidiary" of another company, its "holding company", if that other company:

- holds a majority of the voting rights in it, or
- is a member of it and has the right to appoint or remove a majority of its board of directors, or
- is a member of it and controls alone, pursuant to an agreement with other members, a majority of the voting rights in it, or if it is a subsidiary of a company that is itself a subsidiary of that other company.

The second definition is broader. According to s.1162 of the Companies Act 2006, an undertaking is a parent undertaking in relation to another undertaking, a subsidiary undertaking, if:

- it holds a majority of the voting rights in the undertaking, or
- it is a member of the undertaking and has the right to appoint or remove a majority of its board of directors, or
- it has the right to exercise a dominant influence over the undertaking—
  - by virtue of provisions contained in the undertaking's articles, or
  - by virtue of a control contract, or
- it is a member of the undertaking and controls alone, pursuant to an agreement with other shareholders or members, a majority of the voting rights in the undertaking.

An undertaking is also a parent undertaking in relation to another undertaking, a subsidiary undertaking, if:

- it has the power to exercise, or actually exercises, dominant influence or control over it, or
- it and the subsidiary undertaking are managed on a unified basis.

The broader definition of "subsidiary undertaking" is applied to the accounting provisions of the Companies Act 2006, while the definition of "subsidiary" is used for general purposes.

=== Oceania ===
For the purposes of Australia's Corporations Act 2001, one entity controls another if it can determine the outcome of decisions about the other entity's financial and operating policies.

== See also ==
- Chaebol
- Conglomerate
- Keiretsu
- Zaibatsu
- Associate company
- Consolidation (business)
- Control premium
- Controlling interest
- Cooperative federation
- Division (business)
- Joint venture
- Enterprise value
- Equity method
- Good standing
- Goodwill (accounting)
- Mergers and acquisitions
- Minority interest
- Peren-Clement-Index
