= Vertical agreement =

Agreements between firms at different levels of a supply chain

A vertical agreement is a term used in competition law to denote agreements between firms at different levels of a supply chain. For instance, a manufacturer of consumer electronics might have a vertical agreement with a retailer according to which the latter would promote their products in return for lower prices. Franchising is a form of vertical agreement, and under European Union competition law this falls within the scope of Article 101.

Whether a vertical agreement actually restricts competition and whether in that case the benefits outweigh the anti-competitive effects will often depend on the market structure.

Contractual parties may include contractual restraints or obligations in vertical agreements to protect an investment or to simply ensure day-to-day business operation (e.g. distribution, supply or purchasing arrangements).

== Competition issues ==
Vertical agreements are often exempted from regulatory controls as they give rise to fewer competition concerns than horizontal agreements, which are concluded between two current or potential competitors, and are seen as promoting efficiency in business. Generally, vertical restraints can realise benefits by:

- reducing transaction costs,
- promoting beneficial investments (which would not otherwise occur due to financial, technical or logistical issues),
- helping to solve economic problems such as double marginalization, inefficient input substitution and insufficient pre-sale services.

However, vertical agreements may entail competition law risk when there is a chance that e.g. barriers to entry increase, competition is reduced or softened, and other ways when horizontal collusions are facilitated.

Competition concerns arise when there is insufficient competition at one or more levels of trade.

== European Union: Article 101 TFEU ==
Article 101(1) of the Treaty on the Functioning of the European Union (TFEU) prohibits agreements between undertakings that have as their object or effect the restriction, prevention or distortion of competition within the EU and which have an effect on trade between EU Member States. This prohibition is relevant to all agreements between two or more undertakings regardless whether they are competitors.

Vertical agreement will be illegal under Article 101(2) TFEU when the agreement has a restrictive 'object' or has restrictive 'effects' within the meaning of Article 101(1) TFEU. But if the contracting parties can demonstrate that it falls within a potentially applicable block exemption or can be explicitly justified on efficiency grounds under Article 101(3) TFEU then it may be exempted.

=== EU competition law: block exemptions for vertical agreements ===
Vertical agreements that fulfill the conditions for exemption and do not contain any so-called "hardcore restrictions" of competition are exempted from the prohibition in Article 101(1) of the Treaty on the Functioning of the European Union by Regulation 330/2010. The main exception is agreements for motor vehicle distribution, which remain subject to Regulation 1400/2002 until 31 May 2013, pursuant to a three-year extension granted in Regulation 461/2010. Although this latter regulation applies Regulation 330/2010 to agreements for the repair of motor vehicles and for the distribution of spare parts as of 1 June 2013, it also supplements Regulation 330 with three additional "hardcore" clauses

=== Assessment framework ===
Where it is confirmed that contracting parties operate for the purpose of an agreement at different levels of trade and the agreement has the 'effect on trade', the process for assessing the vertical arrangement under Article 101 TFEU is broadly as follows:

1. determine whether the agreement as a whole falls outside Article 101 TFEU
2. determine whether any contained restraints are restrictions 'by object'—with implications for
  1. the application of the De Minimis Notice (which is European Commission Notice on agreements of minor importance which do not appreciably restrict competition under Article 101(1) TFEU)
  2. the likely application of the Vertical Restraints Block Exemption (Block Exemption) - though this is not definitive since 'by object' restrictions are not synonymous with 'hardcore' restrictions, albeit the concepts often coincide and overlap in their application, and
  3. whether it is necessary to conduct an 'individual assessment' in order to demonstrate appreciable restrictive 'effects'
3. consider whether the agreement meets the criteria set out in the Block Exemption
4. if the agreement does not meet the Block Exemption criteria:
  1. where confirmed not to be 'by object', carry out a case-by-case ('individual') assessment confirming whether the arrangement produces restrictive 'effects' within the meaning of Article 101(1) TFEU
5. if the agreement is found to be restrictive (whether 'by object' or 'effect'), assess whether the agreement benefits from an 'individual exemption' under Article 101(3) TFEU (i.e. generates incremental economic benefits which, amongst other requirements, outweigh the restrictive effects identified).

=== Exemptions from Article 101 TFEU ===
There are cases where certain types of agreements automatically fall outside the scope of Article 101 TFEU, e.g.:

- ICA / intra-group arrangements, since Article 101 TFEU applies only to two or more independent parties
- Relationships between principals and agents which are effectively treated like relationships between parents and controlled subsidiaries (ie 'single economic entities'), if certain conditions are met.
- 'Albany exception' - agreements falling within the framework of collective bargaining between employers and employees and which are intended to improve employment and working conditions
- Subcontracting agreements (normally considered vertical arrangements) - the subcontractor undertakes to produce certain products exclusively for the contractor
- According to Article 106(2) TFEU, Article 101 TFEU is not applied if the compliance with the Article 101 TFEU results in the obstruction of undertakings from performing tasks assigned to them by Member States. However, it is a limited exception and is strictly interpreted.

Additionally to above mentioned restrictions local exemptions may be applied according to member state's legislation.

=== Identifying and classifying restraints ===
Certain vertical agreements are likely to contain restraints which are not in compliance with Article 101 TFEU. These are agreements which contain provisions:

- Facilitation of vertical price-fixing
- Imposition of certain territorial or customer resale obligations/restrictions
- Prohibition or limitation of parallel trade
- Prohibition or limitation of passive sales (most notably in relation to online marketing and sales).

Under the Block Exemption and applicable Commission guidance the above restraints would normally be understood as 'hardcore'. The inclusion of a 'hardcore' restraint automatically removes the potential benefit of the Block Exemption safe harbour to the whole agreement.

The above restraints may also amount to 'by object' restrictions within the meaning of Article 101(1) TFEU.

While the distinction between 'by object' and 'by effect' infringements has become rather blurred, in principle ‘object’ infringements arise from conduct that is inherently (or obviously) anti-competitive and is hence at the more 'serious' end of the scale - 'serious' in terms of likelihood to cause harm and/or the absence of any obvious or credible pro-competitive redeeming features.

A 'by object' finding would not in principle rule out the benefit of the Block Exemption. This is on the basis that a restraint might be deemed 'by object' without it necessarily being considered 'hardcore'. Conversely, a restraint confirmed to be 'hardcore' may not necessarily (though often does) amount to a 'by object' restriction.

Only where a contextual assessment reveals a 'sufficiently harmful' effect on competition (or a lack of any credible redeeming virtues) can an agreement be legally characterised as ‘by object’ within the meaning of Article 101(1) TFEU.

More flexibility exists in relation to other vertical agreements. For example, the following types of agreements will not be considered 'hardcore' under the Block Exemption (they are called 'non-hardcore'):

1. agreements containing recommended or maximum resale price provisions
2. agreements conferring territorial and/or customer exclusivity
3. agreements containing non-compete stipulations
4. exclusive supply agreements
5. agreements containing discount schemes
6. agreements with tying and/or bundling provisions

These are unlikely to be considered 'by object' though this must be assessed in the relevant legal and economic context. Nevertheless some of these arrangements might raise concerns under Article 102 TFEU (or its Member State equivalent) where the party imposing the restraint is dominant.

== United Kingdom ==
In the UK, the Vertical Agreements Block Exemption Order (VABEO) was adopted on 4 May 2022, replacing the EU's block exemption regime which had formed part of retained EU law with effect from 1 June 2022. In advance of issuing VABEO, the UK government undertook a consultation exercise during which respondents "were generally content that the Vertical Agreements Block Exemption Order (VABEO) achieved its intended outcome".

== See also ==
- Horizontal agreement
- Vertical restraints
- Collusion
- Cartel
