= English clause =

English Clause may refer to:

== Law ==
- A vertical restraint under competition law

== Linguistics ==
- English clause syntax
