= Third line forcing =

Third line forcing is a form of exclusive dealing involving the supply of goods or services on the condition that the purchaser buys goods or services from a particular third party, or a refusal to supply because the purchaser will not agree to that condition.

Third line forcing is strictly prohibited by the Australian Competition and Consumer Act 2010 and Algerian law also (article 06 of the ordinance n° 03-03 of July 19 2003).
