= Merger guidelines =

U.S. competition rules

Merger guidelines in the United States are a set of internal rules promulgated by the Antitrust Division of the Department of Justice (DOJ) in conjunction with the Federal Trade Commission (FTC). These rules have been revised over the past four decades. They govern the process by which these two regulatory bodies scrutinize and/or challenge a potential merger. Grounds for challenges include increased market concentration and threat to competition within a relevant market.

The merger guidelines have sections governing both horizontal integration and vertical integration.

== History ==
The first merger guidelines set forth by the DOJ were the 1968 Merger Guidelines. The guidelines were developed by former U.S. Assistant Attorney General Dr. Donald Turner, an economist and lawyer with expertise in the field of industrial organization.

These merger guidelines were criticized in some quarters for excess concern with issues of market structure such as barriers to entry and concentration ratios at the expense of efficiency and economies of scale. They were, however, a step forward in two ways: they gave more accurate advice to corporate management as to when and how mergers would be examined and brought new economic ideas into antitrust enforcement, specifically the "structure-conduct-performance" model of industrial organization.

They remained largely unchanged until 1982 when Associate Attorney General Bill Baxter, under the authority of U.S. Attorney General William French Smith, released a new set of guidelines, which made heavier use of modern concepts of microeconomic theory, including using the Herfindahl index to measure market concentration. The newer guidelines took a more favorable view of economies of scale and efficiency of production as rationales for integration. Moreover, they raised the level of market concentration necessary for the government to scrutinize mergers, effectively treating competition as a means to greater efficiency rather than as an independent goal. This approach was controversial: some antitrust lawyers saw it as a loosening of previous restraints on corporate consolidation, and some State Attorneys General responded to Baxter's changes by tightening merger enforcement at the state level.

The guidelines were revised again in 1984. The only portion of the 1984 guidelines that remains in effect is Section Four, which governs the examination of market effects of vertical integration. These guidelines were replaced by the 1992 Merger Guidelines, which fine-tuned previously established tools and policies, such as the SSNIP test and rules governing the acquisition of failing firms. The 1992 Guidelines were revised in 1997, almost concurrently with the FTC's challenge of the Staples-Office Depot merger in federal court.

The 1997 Horizontal Merger Guidelines were replaced on August 19, 2010. These guidelines introduced the concept of "upward pricing pressure" resulting from a merger between competing firms. The 2010 revisions, while deemed by some to be an improvement, attracted criticism from law and economics scholars who contend that they do not update efficiencies analysis, that they may not be recognized by the courts and that they do not embody principles that reflect dynamic competition.

== See also ==
- United States antitrust law
- Second request (law)
