= Relative market share =

Relative market share indexes a firm's or a brand’s market share against that of its leading competitor. Market concentration, a related metric, measures the degree to which a comparatively small number of firms accounts for a large proportion of the market. These metrics are useful in comparing a firm’s or a brand’s relative position across different markets and in evaluating the type and degree of competition in those markets.

== Purpose ==
The purpose of the “relative market share metric” is to access a firm's or a brand's success and its position in the market. A firm with a market share of 25% would be a powerful leader in many markets but a distant “number two” in others. Relative market share offers a way to benchmark a firm's or a brand's share against that of its largest competitor, enabling managers to compare relative market positions across different product markets. Relative market share gains some of its significance from studies–albeit controversial ones—suggesting that major players in a market tend to be more profitable than their competitors.

== Construction ==
Relative Market Share (%) =
100 * Brand’s Market Share ÷ Largest competitor’s market share

Relative market share can also be calculated by dividing brand sales by largest competitor sales because the common factor of total market sales (or revenue) cancels out.

== See also ==
- Market share
- Growth-share matrix
