= Institute for Consumer Antitrust Studies =

- Motto: For a more competitive, consumer-friendly society
- Established: 1994
- Director: Spencer Waller
- Location: Chicago, Illinois, USA; 41.8973°N 87.6271°W
- Website: www.luc.edu/antitrust

The Institute for Consumer Antitrust Studies is a non-partisan, independent academic center designed to explore the impact of antitrust enforcement on the individual consumer and public, and to shape policy issues. It is located at Loyola University Chicago School of Law in Chicago, Illinois.

The School of Law created the institute in 1994 at the direction of then-dean Nina S. Appel, Professor Jane H. Locke, and a variety of other supporters. Funding for the institute was provided via a cy pres award from the late United States District Judge Hubert Will with funds remaining from a large antitrust settlement. In 2009, the institute celebrated its 15th anniversary.

Beginning in 2000, Professor Spencer Waller became director of the institute. Professor Waller has authored numerous scholarly articles and several books on the subject of antitrust. Prior to joining the institute, Professor Waller served as associate dean at Brooklyn Law School. In addition to teaching, Professor Waller practiced with the United States Department of Justice Antitrust and Criminal Divisions and with the Chicago law firm of Freeborn & Peters.

== Fellowship ==
=== Student Fellowship and Certificate Programs ===
Fellows attend all institute events as well as special programs designed to inform them of current topics of interest in competition law, practice and policy. These special programs introduce the fellows to the key policymakers in the public and private sectors. Each year, the institute sends fellows to the ABA Section of Antitrust Spring Meeting. In addition, fellows engage in externships with organizations such as the Federal Trade Commission, the Illinois Attorney General, public interest groups and private law firms.

The fellows write papers on timely antitrust and consumer protection issues, recent Supreme Court decisions and new developments in these fields.

Alumni of the Student Fellowship Program work at a wide variety of law firms, government agencies and corporate counsel offices. The institute has alumni who followed career paths at the U.S. Department of Justice Antitrust Division, the Consumer Financial Protection Bureau and Brooklyn Legal Services Foreclosure Defense.

== Events ==
The institute holds a variety of programs that bring together legal scholars to talk about antitrust and consumer protection issues. Among many other events, the institute sponsors a brown bag lunch program that brings influential leaders in government and private practice to the institute to talk with Student Fellows about their experiences in antitrust and consumer protection law, and their careers.

The institute also invites members of other programs and clubs at Loyola University Chicago, School of Law, to the brown bag lunch events to encourage and facilitate an interdisciplinary focus of the institute as a whole.

=== Upcoming events ===
On June 5–6, 2016 the 4th Loyola-Haifa Antitrust Workshop on Antitrust and Changing Technology will take place at Haifa University in Israel.

On September 20, 2016, The institute will co-sponsor with the Antitrust Section of the ABA and the Beazely Health Law Institute a program on Health Care and Financial Services: Competition and Consumers in Regulated Industries. This symposium will take place in the 10th Floor Ceremonial Courtroom at the Corboy Law Center.

=== Annual colloquium ===
Each April, since 2000, the institute sponsors its annual Loyola Antitrust Colloquium. The colloquium features presentations of academic papers followed by commentary from lawyers, economists, and professors. Past keynote speakers include Federal Trade Commissioners Julie Brill, Edith Ramirez, and William Kovacic.

The 16th Annual Loyola Antitrust Colloquium was held on April 15, 2016. Federal Trade Commissioner Terrell McSweeny delivered the keynote address.

The 15th Annual Loyola Antitrust Colloquium was held on April 24, 2015 David Gelfand, Deputy Assistant Attorney General for Litigation, Antitrust Division, U.S. Dep't of Justice delivered the keynote address.

== People ==
Advisory Board

The Institute for Consumer Antitrust Studies maintains two Advisory Boards: an International Advisory Board and a Domestic Advisory Board. The boards are composed of lawyers, professors and policymakers who advise the director and School of Law on issues and programs of interest to the antitrust community.

Faculty

Spencer Weber Waller, Director; Christine Chabot, Interim Director; Lea Krivinskas Shepard; James Thuo Gathii, Wing-Tat Lee Chair in International Law and Professor of Law

=== Adjunct and Visiting Faculty ===
Ted Banks; Laura De Sanctis; Alan S. Frankel; David Marx, Jr.; Andre Fiebig; Dr. Michael Gal; Dr. James Langenfeld; and Dr. Philip Marsden.

=== Visiting Scholars ===
2016: Ariel Ezrachi, Pembroke College, University of Oxford.

=== Distinguished Fellow in Residence ===
Hon. Neil Hartigan

Staff

Evelyn Gonzalez, Administrator

Student Fellows

Class of 2015-16: Bailey Brandon; Ryan Marcus; Krystyna Kudlata; Maureen Moody; Marko Stojkovic; Angela Sukurs; Adrienne Yoseph.

Class of 2014-15: Kristine Bergman; Nicole Grabianowski; Duo Park; Andrea Reino; Ericka Taschler; James Ulwick

Class of 2013-14: Brandon Cabanaughl Patrick Gleeson; Greg Jones; Eric Olson; Ismael Salam.
