= Exclusive dealing =

Anti-competitive business practice where a supplier limits the rights of the buyer

In economics and law, exclusive dealing arises when a supplier entails the buyer by placing limitations on the rights of the buyer to choose what, who and where they deal. This is against the law in most countries which include the USA, Australia and Europe when it has a significant impact of substantially lessening the competition in an industry. When the sales outlets are owned by the supplier, exclusive dealing is legal because of vertical integration, where the outlets are independent exclusive dealing is illegal (in the US) due to the Restrictive Trade Practices Act, however, if it is registered and approved it is allowed. While primarily those agreements imposed by sellers are concerned with the comprehensive literature on exclusive dealing, some exclusive dealing arrangements are imposed by buyers instead of sellers.

Exclusive dealing can be considered as a barrier to entry especially in market that operate under imperfect competition, which is either Monopoly or Oligopoly where there is price and product differentiation as well as an imbalance of market power between incumbent, entrants and competitors due to the existing of vertical integrations within the market, leading to market inefficiencies.

== In Australian law ==
Alternative methods of exclusive dealing are prohibited by Section 47 of the CCA. Broadly, anti-competitive vertical transactions are prohibited

1. (1)" the conditional supply (or acquisition) of goods or services (conditions may relate to the ability to re-supply, exclusivity, limits on ability to acquire from competitors etc)
2. (2) refusing to supply for specified reasons (eg, because purchaser refuses to agree to a conditional supply)"

All exclusive trade is recorded only if it can be demonstrated, to have the impact of substantially lessening competition (s 47(10)).

== In British politics ==
In British politics, 'exclusive dealing' was, before the introduction of the secret ballot by the Ballot Act 1872, a means by which those without the vote could exert pressure on shopkeepers etc. – a policy that any shopkeeper voting against the popular candidate would lose the custom of non-voters of an opposite persuasion. The practice was much the same as a modern boycott; it was effective for the Radicals in some borough constituencies, and they were therefore wary of any offer or attempt to introduce the secret ballot ahead of a substantial extension of the franchise.

== In European Union law ==
Exclusive dealing agreements under the Article 102 of the Treaty on the Functioning of the European Union are the Vertical agreements that bind the customer to purchase all or most of a specific type of goods or services only from the dominant supplier. The term exclusive dealing agreement refers to an arrangement under which the supplier is restricted in their ability to supply anyone other than the specific down-stream customer and vice versa. The Commission stated in Guidelines on Vertical Restraints that agreements binding to purchase goods of 80% or more, will be caught in line with the meaning of exclusive dealings and may be determined abusive, see Case 85/76. An exclusive purchase agreement is not per se illegal under Article 102 (see Case C-413/14) and can only be deemed abusive if it can be capable having a foreclosure effect on as-efficient competitors and has no objective justification, see. Hence, a defence that the customer willingly entered into agreement will not suffice; the question is whether the agreement might horizontally foreclose competitors as efficient (or more) that the dominant company in the appropriate market, see Case 85/76 and Case C-393/92.

In economics and law, there are many forms of exclusive dealing, however the three most commonly known are:

1. De facto/Partial exclusive dealing
2. Third line forcing
3. Full line forcing

== De facto/partial exclusive dealing ==
De Facto, also known as partial exclusive dealing, occurs in the presence of:

- Loyalty discounts, a discount when buyer purchases majority of goods from one supplier
- Slotting allowances, the supplier pays a fee to secure shelf space from the buyer
- Requirements contracts, agreement to purchase all units form one supplier, as buyer cannot purchase from any other supplier in the market, which is a term stated in a buyer/supplier contract

== Third line forcing ==
Third line forcing involves the supply of goods or services on condition that the purchaser acquires goods or services from a particular third party, or a refusal to supply because the purchaser will not agree to that condition.

Elements of third line forcing

- purchaser wants a specific product, but the purchase of another product is forced on them;
- The business forces the product of a third party onto the purchaser;
- Forced purchase of third part's product in order to obtain desired product

Third line forcing is prohibited when it has a substantially lessening impact of competition in the industry

== Case illustrating third line forcing ==
Australian Consumer & Competition Commission v Black & White Cabs (Australia) [2010]

Facts: A number of operators were required by Black and White Cabs to acquire services from Cabcharge Australia Ltd (an unrelated third party online payment transaction business). B&W Cabs recognised that it had violated antitrust law and that the proposed relief was appropriate.

Held: Black and white Cabs was held guilty, as they engaged in third line exclusive exclusive dealing under the Australian law s 47(6) prohibited by s 47(1) by supplying their services under the conception that the taxi-cab network has to acquire services from Cabcharge Australia Ltd, a third part unrelated business in order to have access to Black and White Cab's services.

Penalties and remedies Restraining B&W Cabs from providing or promising to provide, taxi booking, dispatch or other services to authorised taxi service operators, so that other products and/or services, including digital payment services, are acquired by licensed taxi service operators from any third party not associated to B&W Cabs, including Cabcharge, for a five year term.The condition of the penalty were as follows:

- that B&W Cabs create, retain and implement Trade Practices Enforcement and Education / Training Program for a three-year duration
- that B&W Cabs issue letters to all licensed taxi service operators who have purchased such services from B&W Cabs
- B&W Cabs pay a $110,000 cash penalty. To be billed in instalments.
- B&W Cabs spend $10,000 towards ACCC expenditures.

== Examples of third line forcing ==
- Tied petrol stations that only deal with one petroleum supplier or seller.
- Public houses tied to breweries.
- Franchisees forced to buy product from a host company instead of a local provider.
- seller agreeing to sell only to certain buyer
- market segmentation approach

== Full line forcing ==
Full line forcing is also known as exclusive purchasing as it limited the buyer to only purchasing and stocking the product of one supplier also regarded to as single branding. A business is said to have engaged in Full line forcing, if it imposes the following conditions on the buyer:

- to not purchase products from a competitor; or
- to not resupply products purchased from a competitor; or
- to not resupply its product to a particular place.

Full line forcing breaches the law if it is proven to have a substantially lessening effect on competition in the industry. This is identified by the substantial lessening competition test.

== Case illustrating full line forcing ==
Trade Practices Commission v. Massey Ferguson (Australia) Ltd. (1983)

Facts The respondent agreed to supply agricultural farm machinery sold under the name "Massey Ferguson" in September and October 1977 to "Wood 's West Port Machinery" of Koo Wee Rup, Victoria, on condition that they would not purchase agricultural tractors directly or indirectly from a competitor of the respondent. The respondent declined to supply agricultural tractors and headers to "Central Engineers" of Temora, N.S.W. in 1978 on the grounds that it had agreed with a supplier to not acquire products from its competitors, therefore, it would be breaking the contract rules.

Held: In a case against the respondent with regard to three products of exclusive dealing in violation of the Australian Consumer and Competition Law The respondent admitted to 47(1) of the Trade Practices Act 1974 the conduct likely to have the effect of significantly reducing competition for agricultural tractors and/or headers on the wholesale market in Australia. With regard to the effective penalty to be levied pursuant to s76.

Therefore, acts of exclusive dealing were not present, however, the acts committed by Massey had the likely impact of leading to the substantial lessening competition as it was done unknowingly. However, since it would lead to less competition in the industry, they are to be penalised for such behaviour. The respondent's actions aided to substantially lessening competition in the Australian wholesale market for tractors and headers.

Penalties and remedies The penalty and remedies included a once of payment of $40,00 as well as the correction of the neglectful behaviour of the defendant to ensure that they are knowledgeable of the repercussions of practicing full-line forcing either International or unintentionally in the market.

== Substantial lessening competition test ==
It is not sufficient to prove that a business has been damaged, under the substantial lessening test certain conditions have to be met to confirm that a business has breached the law. An analysis of the following factors must be conducted in order to conclude that the behaviour of a supplier is substantially lessening competition when the whole market for the product is impacted as well as the product substitute and if the refusal of supply of desired product would substantially affect the availability of the product to customers.

== Industry impacts of exclusive dealing ==
Exclusive dealing can offer a significant competitive advantage for businesses, however it can also pose threats such as anticompetitive risks.The most commonly known issue of exclusive dealing is called Customer foreclosure. Customer foreclosure is an exercise of market power by upstream suppliers, it occurs where a large number of customers cannot be accessed by the competitors, which in turn reduces the efficiency of these downstream firms.As a result of this the more dominant firm has the ability to reduce quantity or to increase the price of products at its disposal due to weakened competition from its competitors. This leaves customers vulnerable as there are forced to buy from the dominant supplier.

It is typically a seller who imposes exclusivity in the literature on exclusive dealing.The reason for the restraint of a seller may be procompetitive, such as preventing rival suppliers from:

- freely riding on the investments of the seller in the sales efficiency of a retailer.Efficiency reasons for exclusive dealing are:
- Encouraging distributors to actively promote goods from a manufacturer
- Encourages suppliers to help distributors by proving more information
- Eliminating the free rider problem amongst suppliers
- Allowing the control of distribution quality by suppliers

Exclusive dealing induced by the seller may also lead to anticompetitive behaviour. This is true if it leads to. a foreclosure that removes competitors from a large portion of the market for a prolonged time period.This is also true in the case of an entrant where the dominant incumbent can deter the entry of an efficient entrant though the practice of exclusive dealing. Inefficient results for exclusive dealing are:

- Price decrease and an overall decrease in market output
- Increase in the dominant's firm's market share as well as the amount of product distributed
- Less competitors in the market as they are forced to exist due to exclusive dealing
- Incumbents have increase market power as they are bale to deter entry of new entrants to the market

== Buyer induced exclusive dealing ==
Exclusive dealing is commonly known as a supplier induced act, however the buyer has the power to influence exclusive dealing through multiple methods. At the manufacturing point, there is more market influence downstream than upstream in certain distribution networks because "consumers are more likely to switch products inside the supermarket than switch brand stores". Dobson (2008) noted that "buyer-led constraints most frequently occur when the buyer has some negotiating advantage over suppliers that guarantees their compliance or consent.

The consumer-welfare consequences of exclusive dealings caused by buyers are not apparent. If a dealer sticks to a single supplier of a marketed consumer product, exclusive dealing decreases the options of customers. Those customers who may not find their favourite brand in stock at a retailer must either choose a different brand or a different retailer in the face of restricted brand availability. It is true that reducing the selection of choices is harmful to the welfare of customers, but it is also possible that this form of exclusion is possible.

There have been two investigations to prove the existence of buyer induced exclusive dealing by Gabrielsen and Sørgard (1999) as well as Klein and Murphy (2008) Investigate purchaser-induced exclusive dealings with a monopoly manufacturer and two suppliers of a distinct commodity. In the model Gabrielsen and Sørgard (1999) suggests that the retailer chooses, ex ante, whether to solicit exclusive or non-exclusive delivery bids from suppliers. Wholesale rates are, in any case, dictated by Bertrand competition model between suppliers. Next, the retailer marks up selling rates for resale to buyers in a double-marginalization strategy. The retailer can opt for an exclusive trading deal with one of the manufacturers, based on customer demand for the brands and Klein and Murphy (2008).

Klein and Murphy (2008)'s model suggests that "the retailer has buyer control in the upstream market but faces downstream competition in a model of one retailer and two suppliers with a differentiated commodity." Competitors persuade the firm to charge retail rates that barely cover operational costs. The model also assumes that the retailer distributes single brand products. The model also indicates that there is no incentive for the retailer to attempt or pursue the distribution of products form more than one manufacturer, as the retailer will conduct a procurement auction to determine the product it will distribute. This situation leads to the utilisation of the Bertrand competition to drive wholesale prices down as well as manufacturers costs.

== See also ==
- Anti-competitive practices
- Competition policy
- Fair Trading Act
- Vertical restraints
