= Dennis Mueller =

American economist

Dennis Cary Mueller (born June 13, 1940) is an emeritus professor of economics at the University of Vienna. His academic work focused on the principal-agent problem, corporate governance, and political economy.

== Career ==
He received a PhD in economics from Princeton University in 1966, where Jesse W. Markham and Stephen Goldfeld supervised his dissertation, "The Determinants of Industrial Research and Development." He held several academic positions in Canada, the US, and Germany. He became a professor at the University of Vienna in 1994 and emeritus in 2008.

== Work ==
Mueller is a past president of the Public Choice Society, the Southern Economic Association, the Industrial Organization Society, and EARIE. His main research interests are in public choice and industrial economics. His work is mainly about high-ranking people taking advantage of informational transaction costs. Governments pursue their agenda of enlarging to inefficient sizes in the name of public interest at the expense of actual owners, citizens, and taxpayers. Corporate managers pursue their agenda of unnecessarily making companies large and efficient at the cost of the actual owners, as well as stockholders.

On the public choice approach, he said, "Public choice approach is the economic study of non-market decision making or an application of economics to political science and the politico-administrative process of collective decision making."
