= Jesse W. Markham =

American economist

Jesse William Markham
- Born: April 16, 1916; Sharps, Virginia
- Died: June 21, 2009 (aged 93); Nashua, New Hampshire
- Education: University of Richmond; Harvard University
- Scientific career
- Workplaces: Harvard Business School; Princeton University
- Doctoral advisor: Edward S. Mason
- Doctoral students: Dennis Mueller

Jesse William Markham (April 16, 1916 – June 21, 2009) was an American economist. Markham was best known for his work on antitrust policy, price theory and industrial organization. Markham was the Charles Edward Wilson Professor of Business Administration at Harvard Business School (HBS), and the former chief economist to the Federal Trade Commission.

== Early life and education ==
Markham was born in Sharps, Virginia. Markham attended the University of Richmond, where he played baseball. In 1941, he earned an undergraduate degree in economics and was elected to Phi Beta Kappa. After graduating from Richmond, he began graduate school in economics that fall at Johns Hopkins University.

In 1942, Markham enlisted in World War II where he served as an officer in the U.S. Navy for three years. Markham served in the Atlantic theater on the USS Augusta, which was the heavy cruiser acting as the flagship for the Normandy invasion, where he saw combat from the first attack on D-Day.

After the War, Markham began studies at Harvard University, and earned a master's degree in 1947 and a Ph.D. in 1949 in economics.

== Career ==
In 1948, Markham began his career as an associate professor at Vanderbilt University where he worked until 1952.

=== Federal Trade Commission ===
In 1953, the Federal Trade Commission selected Markham to be the FTC's chief economist. Markham recalled: "At a time when Congress had passed an act putting arbitrary constraints on corporate mergers, the Eisenhower administration saw me as a voice in favor of a standard of workable, as opposed to perfect, competition. I could advocate the benefits of letting certain firms work together to foster innovation, which buyers value just as much as temporary price advantages - the traditional yardstick of competitiveness." Markham left the FTC in 1955.

In 1964, Markham wrote an article for the Columbia Law Review entitled "The Federal Trade Commission's Use of Economics." Markham criticized the FTC for relying on oversimplified rules of thumb, instead of the tedious analysis Congress seemed to have in mind as one of the agency's principal functions.

In 2003, Markham returned to the FTC to comment on economists' role in antitrust during the 1950s and 1960s.

=== Professor of economics ===
From 1955 until 1968, Markham was Professor of Economics at Princeton University, but visited as a professor in the Harvard economics department and at the Harvard Business School. In 1958, Markham served as an economic delegate for the European Common Market (now the OEEC). Markham was Dennis Mueller's thesis advisor at Princeton.

In 1968, Markham accepted George P. Baker's invitation to serve as Harvard Business School's Charles E. Wilson Professor of Business Administration. While at HBS, Markham worked alongside Paul Samuelson, the first American Nobel laureate in economics.

Markham retired from HBS in 1982, but continued to teach at the Harvard Extension School and at Emory University at the Carter Center. In 1989, he served as a People to People Diplomacy Mission Delegate to the USSR.

== Personal life ==
Markham was a part-time resident of Longboat Key, Florida. Markham married Penelope Anton in 1944, and they had three children: Elizabeth (Betsy) McLean, John James Emanuel, II, and Jesse William Jr.

== Books ==
- Baseball economics and public policy (1981)
- Horizontal divestiture and the petroleum industry (1977)
- Conglomerate Enterprise and Public Policy (1973)
- Industrial organization and economic development : in honour of E.S. Mason (1970)
- The market economy in historical perspective (1966)
- The Common Market: Friend or competitor? (The Charles C. Moskowitz lectures) (1964)
- Inflation, growth, and employment (1964)
- The American economy (1963)
- Prescription drugs and the public health : a digest of the presentation (1962)
- The fertilizer industry; study of an imperfect market (1958)
- Competition in the Rayon Industry (1952)
