= John Maurice Clark =

American economist

- Born: November 30, 1884; Northampton, Massachusetts, U.S.
- Died: June 27, 1963 (aged 78); Westport, Connecticut, U.S.

Academic background
- Influences: Thorstein Veblen

Academic work
- Discipline: Political economics
- School or tradition: Institutional economics

John Maurice Clark (1884–1963) was an American economist whose work combined the rigor of traditional economic analysis with an "institutionalist" attitude. Clark was a pioneer in developing the notion of workable competition and the theoretical basis of modern Keynesian economics, including the concept of the economic multiplier.

== Biography ==
=== Early career ===
John Maurice Clark was born November 30, 1884, in Northampton, Massachusetts. He studied at Amherst College, graduating in 1905, and received his Ph.D. from Columbia University in 1910.

J.M. Clark was the son of economist John Bates Clark (1847–1938) and shared his father's concern with ethical and policy issues, in keeping with much intellectual thought during the Progressive Era. Father and son worked jointly on rewriting and expanding John Bates Clark's 1912 book The Control of Trusts, with the new edition seeing publication in 1914. Work upon this theme would be continued by J.M. Clark in his Social Control of Business (1926, revised in 1939).

Clark was an instructor at Colorado College from 1908 to 1910 and at Amherst College from 1910 until 1915, when he left to join the faculty of political economy at the University of Chicago. He accepted a professorship at Columbia in 1923, assuming the post previously held there by his father. He would remain at Columbia for the remaining three decades of his academic life, finally retiring in 1957.

=== Contributions ===
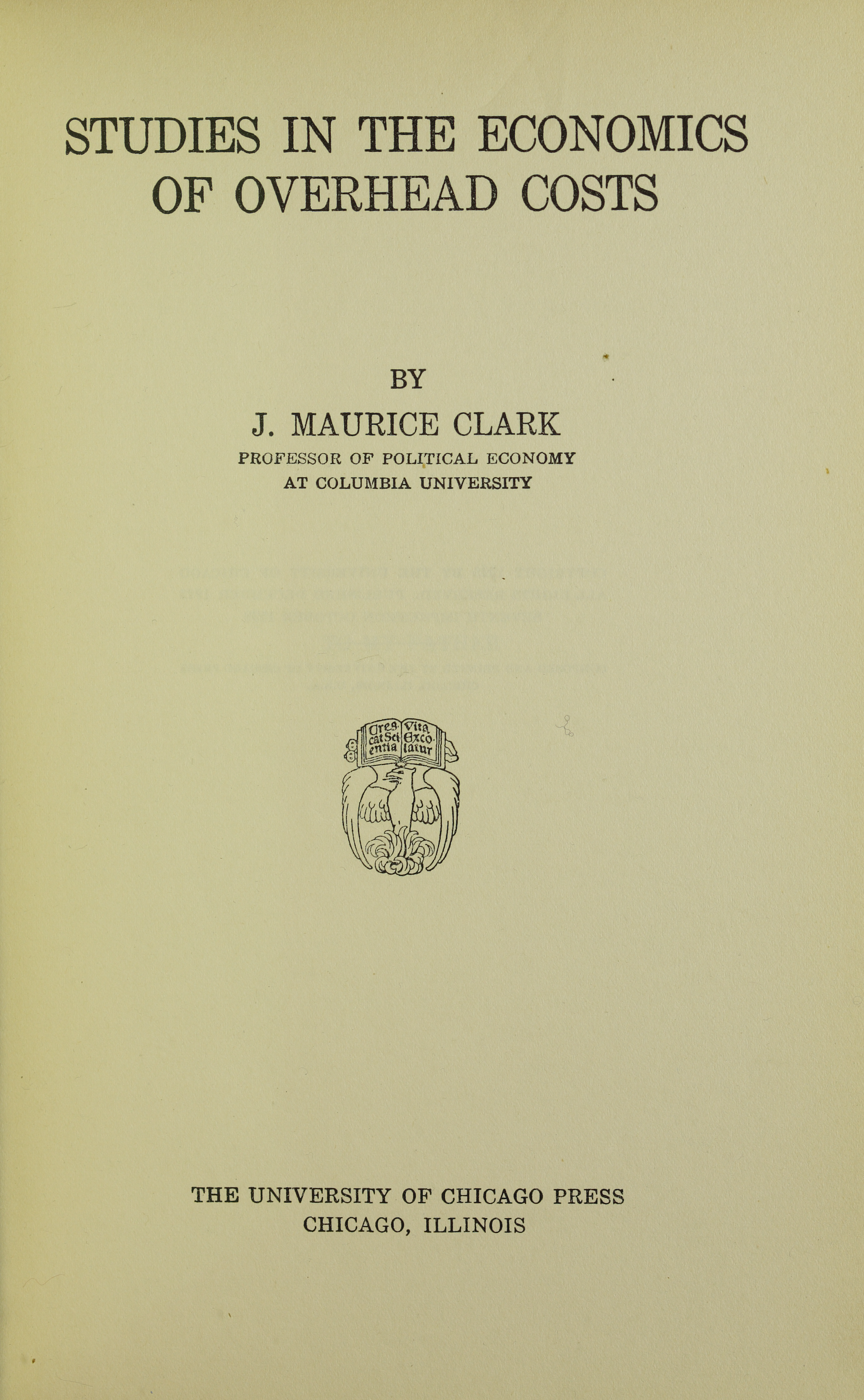
Studies in the economics of overhead costs, 1923

Throughout his career Clark was concerned with the dynamics of a market economy.

In his early work Studies in the Economics of Overhead Costs (1923), Clark developed his theory of the acceleration principle, that investment demand can fluctuate widely when consumer demand fluctuates. In this he anticipated key Keynesian theories of investment and business cycles. Clark also examined the relationship between firm size and production cost, demonstrating the way firms with high fixed costs could dramatically reduce average cost of production by expanding output, thus explaining the price leverage wielded by giant firms in capital-intensive industries. The work illustrated the critical importance of accurate cost information for those seeking the effective regulation of monopolistic or oligopolistic firms.

Clark's next published work, Social Control of Business (1926), continued the theme of national economic governance, detailing the institutional, economic, and legal factors that limited social oversight of monopolistic behavior. Clark argued that accounting provided an essential mechanism for the monitoring of the behavior of economically mighty firms to assure their operation within the limits established by regulation.

In his 1931 book The Costs of the World War to the American People, Clark first broached the concept of the economic multiplier, the idea that "all expenditures give rise to subsequent income effects and that their aggregated sum can always be expressed as a multiple of the original disbursement." In this work Clark developed the idea of multiplier effects for foreign trade and capital investment in advancing this thesis that the actual cost of World War I to the American people substantially exceeded the sum of nominal expenditures by the government upon the war.

Clark expanded upon the consideration of the multiplier effect in public planning in his 1935 book, Economics of Planning Public Works. With America mired in the Great Depression and book sales weak, Clark was unable to find a commercial or academic publisher for this work. The National Planning Board of the U.S. Government ultimately published the title via the United States Government Printing Office. The opus has since come to be regarded as a classic in its field.

Clark is considered one of the founders of the theory of workable competition, neither pure competition nor pure monopoly, a neglected Marshallian insight.

=== Honors ===
Clark was elected to the American Academy of Arts and Sciences in 1934. He was President of the American Economic Association (AEA) in 1935 and was recognized with that organization's highest award, the Francis A. Walker Medal, in 1952. He was elected to the American Philosophical Society in 1944.

=== Death ===
J.M. Clark died on June 27, 1963, aged 78, in Westport, Connecticut.

== Works ==
- Standards of Reasonableness in Local Freight Discriminations. New York: Columbia University, 1910.
- The Control of Trusts. Rewritten and enlarged edition, with John Bates Clark. New York: Macmillan, 1914.
- Studies in the Economics of Overhead Costs. Chicago: University of Chicago Press, 1923.
- Social Control of Business. Chicago: University of Chicago Press, 1926.
- The Costs of the World War to the American People. New Haven, CT: Yale University Press, 1931.
- Strategic Factors in Business Cycles. New York: National Bureau of Economic Research, 1934.
- The Economics of Planning Public Works. Washington, DC: U.S. Government Printing Office, 1935.
- Preface to Social Economics. New York: Farrar & Rinehart, 1936.
- An Alternative to Serfdom: Five Lectures Delivered on the William W. Cook Foundation at the University of Michigan, March 1947. Oxford, England: Basil Blackwell, 1948. American edition: 1950.
- The Ethical Basis of Economic Freedom. Westport, CT: C.K. Kazanjian Economics Foundation, 1955.
- Economic Institutions and Human Welfare. New York: Alfred A. Knopf, 1957.
- Competition as a Dynamic Process. Washington, DC: Brookings Institution, 1961.
