= Double marginalization =

Inefficiency from multiple monopolistic firms

In industrial economics, double marginalization occurs when two firms at different levels of the supply chain possess market power and independently apply markups, resulting in a final price that is higher than it would be if the firms were integrated. Double marginalization is clearly negative from an economic welfare point of view, as the double markup leads to a final price is higher than the price that would maximize the firms' joint profit, lowering both producer and consumer surpluses. The situation arises from externalities: each firm does not fully take into account the impact of its pricing on the other firm.

== Example ==
Consider an industry with an upstream manufacturer and a downstream retailer. The manufacturer does not sell directly to consumers, but through the retailer. Suppose that the consumer demand for the product is given by the function $\mathrm{Q}=10-p$ where $p$ is the final consumer price, the manufacturer has a constant marginal cost of $c = 2$, while the retailer does not incur any costs, other than the wholesale price paid to the manufacturer.

In the case that a single monopolist controls both the upstream and downstream operation, the price that would maximize its total profit $\Pi = (p - 2) (10 - p)$ is $p = 6$, resulting in a quantity of $\mathrm{Q} = 4$ and a total profit of 16.

In a non-integrated scenario, the monopolist manufacturer sets the wholesale price $w$, then retailer observes the retail price and sets the final price $p$. Given the wholesale price $w$, the retailer's profit is given by $(p - w)(10 - p)$. Thus, its profit-maximizing price is $p = 5 + 0.5 w$, corresponding to the quantity of $Q = 10 - (5 - 0.5 w) = 5 - 0.5 w$.

Taking into account the price that the retailer would set, the manufacturer's profit is given by $(w - 2)(5 - 0.5p_m)$. Thus, its profit maximizing price is $w = 6$, leading to the final retailer's price of $p = 5 + (0.5 \times 6) = 8$. This results in a total quantity produced of $\mathrm{Q} = 2$. The manufacturer's profit is 8, and the retailer's profit is 4. The combined profit of the two firms in this case is lower than the profit that would be earned by an integrated monopolist, while the consumer's price is also higher.

== Solutions ==
There are numerous mechanisms to prevent or at least limit double marginalization. These include, among others, the following.

- Vertical integration: In the case of double marginalization, both firms within the same supply chain are increasing their prices beyond their marginal costs which create deadweight losses. By vertically integrating, these deadweight losses will be eliminated and the vertically integrated company can incorporate a pricing strategy that is conducive to profit and welfare maximization.
- Franchise fee: The upstream firm sells the downstream firm the right to distribute their product through a lump sum fixed fee known as the Franchise Fee. The upstream firm will sell each unit of their product at the same price as the marginal cost of production, so their profits will be derived from the franchise fee, further indicating that the downstream firm should sell at the monopoly price for profit maximization.
- Nonlinear pricing: The first company does not charge a quantity-independent price per item, but makes the unit price dependent on the total quantity sold. If the discount scheme is optimally selected, it corresponds exactly to the franchise solution.
- Resale price maintenance: The first company prescribes the second the selling price of the final product.
- Competition: If a manufacturer sells its products to competing retailers, the competition among them will reduce the second markup.

Note that the above mechanisms only solve the problem of double marginalization; from an overall welfare point of view, the problem of monopoly pricing remains. It should also be noted that while some of the solutions presented above, such as mergers, have a positive effect in minimizing the double markup present within the vertical competition, but it damages the horizontal competition.

== Role in antitrust analysis ==
In the analysis of competition (antitrust) law, the elimination of double marginalization is cited as a potential benefit for vertical integration (merger between firms at different levels of production) and vertical restraints. For example, the European Union Guidelines on the assessment of non-horizontal mergers recognizes that "a vertical merger allows the merged entity to internalise any pre-existing double mark-ups resulting from both parties setting their prices independently pre-merger", while the Guidelines on vertical restraints includes lower prices as a possible positive effects of vertical agreements, as "there may be situations where, from the supplier’s perspective, the distributor may be pricing too high". Similarly, the U.S. 2020 Vertical Merger Guidelines recognizes that "vertical mergers often benefit consumers through the elimination of double marginalization, which tends to lessen the risks of competitive harm". Elimination of double marginalization was cited as a "standard benefit" associated with vertical mergers in the case United States v. AT&T, where the U.S. government unsuccessfully sought to block the merger between AT&T and Time Warner. The government's expert witness Carl Shapiro conceded that the elimination of double marginalization would result in US$352 million savings to AT&T customers.
