= Relevant market =

Legal concept

In competition law, a relevant market is a market in which a particular product or service is sold. It is the intersection of a relevant product market and a relevant geographic market. The European Commission defines a relevant market and its product and geographic components as follows:

1. A relevant product market comprises all those products and/or services which are regarded as interchangeable or substitutable by the consumer by reason of the products' characteristics, their prices and their intended use;
2. A relevant geographic market comprises the area in which the firms concerned are involved in the supply of products or services and in which the conditions of competition are sufficiently homogeneous.

== Definition and use ==
The notion of relevant market is used in order to identify the products and undertakings which are directly competing in a business. Therefore, the relevant market is the market where the competition takes place. The enforcement of the provisions of competition law would be not possible without referring to the market where competition takes place. The extent to which firms are able to increase their prices above normal competition levels depends on the possibility for consumers to buy substitute goods and the ability for other firms to supply those products. The fewer the substitute products and/or the more difficult it is for other firms to begin to supply those products, the less elastic the demand curve is and the more probable is to find higher prices. For all these reasons it is necessary to define the relevant markets for the different cases which fall under the Law.

The relevant market contains all those substitute products and regions which provide a significant competitive constraint on the products and regions of interest. An interesting guiding principle provided by Bishop and Darcey (1995) states that a relevant market is something worth monopolising, in the sense that the relevant market includes all the substitute products and therefore control of that market would allow the monopoliser to profitably increase the prices of the products to the monopoly level. This can only be possible if the products in this "market" are not subject to significant competitive constraints by products outside that market.

In the United States, there exist a set of merger guidelines—written by the Antitrust Division of the Department of Justice (DOJ) and the Federal Trade Commission (FTC)—which specify methods for analyzing and defining markets. Since 1980, the DOJ and the FTC have used these guidelines to convince courts to adopt a more explicitly economic approach to antitrust policy.

In the European Union, in 1997 the European Commission adopted a Market Definition Notice, general guidelines on market definition across all provisions of EU competition law. A revised Notice was adopted in 2024. The revised Notice is the result of a thorough exercise of evidence gathering and public consultation. The revised Notice includes changes to take into account substantive, methodology, and evidence challenges in the context of digital markets and innovative industries, which have been an ongoing subject of discussion and scholarship.

A relevant market comprises a product or group of products and the geographic area in which these products are produced and/or traded. Therefore, the relevant market has two components: the product market and the geographic market. The relevant market may also be a market for labor.

=== Product market ===
The relevant product market is determined according to three criteria:

1. Demand-side substitution.
2. Supply-side substitution.
3. Potential competition.

==== Demand-side substitution ====
Demand-side substitution takes place when consumers switch from one product to another in response to a change in the relative prices of the products. If consumers are in a position to switch to available substitute products or to begin sourcing their requirements from suppliers located in other areas, then it is unlikely that price increases will be profitable. Therefore, it is necessary to progressively include in the relevant market the products to which consumers would most likely switch in response to a relative price rise, repeating the exercise at each stage until a collection of products is reached that is worth monopolising.

When examining the likely responses of consumers, it is the response of the marginal consumer, not the average consumer which is important. Therefore, a small but significant number of consumers (generally 5 to 10 percent) switching to another product when there is a price increase is considered a sufficient condition for both goods to be defined as forming part of the same relevant market. Therefore, the existence of a group of consumers who would never switch in response to a relative price increase is not by itself sufficient to conclude that the relevant market should be defined narrowly.

Determining both the likely extent of demand-side substitution, and the level of substitution which would imply that monopolisation was not worthwhile, requires an assessment of the price-elasticity of demand. This is generally done using the SSNIP-test. However, in digital markets, where consumers are often offered services for free, the SSNIP test cannot be performed, being the price equal to zero. For this reason, different techniques (including machine learning) are employed to define the relevant market.

==== Supply-side substitution ====
Sometimes consumers may be unable to react to a price increase, nevertheless, producers may be able to do so by for example, increasing their supply to satisfy the demand of these consumers. If other producers respond to an increase in the relative price of the products supplied by the single supplier by switching production facilities to producing the monopolized collection of products, the increased level of supply may render any attempted price increase unprofitable. In this case, those producers with the ability for supply-side substitution should be included in the relevant market.

=== Geographic market ===
The geographic market is an area in which the conditions of competition applying to the product concerned are the same for all traders. The same factors used in delineating relevant product markets should be used to define the relevant geographic market.

The elements to be taken into consideration when defining the relevant geographic market include the nature and characteristics of the concerned products, the existence of entry barriers, consumer preferences, differences among the market shares of undertakings in the neighboring geographic areas, as well as significant differences between suppliers’ prices and transport costs level.

An interesting aspect to which competition authorities look at are transport costs, given that high transport costs may explain why trade between two regions is economically infeasible.

== See also ==
- Competition law
- European Commission
- European Court of Justice
- United Brands Company v Commission of the European Communities
- Federal Trade Commission
- Anti-trust law
- United States Department of Justice Antitrust Division
- Industrial organization
- SSNIP

== Bibliography ==
- Bellamy, Christopher; Child, Graham D. (1993). Rose, Vivien (ed.). Common Market law of competition. London: Sweet & Maxwell. ISBN 978-0-421-48930-1.
- Bishop, Simon; Walker, Mike (1999). Economics of EC competition law: concepts, application and measurement. E. C. competition law. London: Sweet & Maxwell. ISBN 978-0-421-57940-8.
- Bishop, Simon; Darcey, M. (1995), A Relevant Market Is Something Worth Monopolising (Unpublished Mimeo)
