= Competition law =

Law maintaining market competition

Competition law, also known by many as antitrust law, is the field of law that promotes and maintains market competition by regulating anti-competitive conduct by companies.

The history of competition law reaches back to the Roman Empire. The business practices of market traders, guilds, and governments have always been subject to scrutiny, and sometimes severe sanctions. Since the late 20th century, competition law has become increasingly global. The two largest and most influential systems of competition regulation are United States antitrust law, named after the trust busting of monopolistic trusts, and European Union competition law. National and regional competition authorities across the world have formed international support and enforcement networks.

Modern competition law has historically evolved on a national level to promote and maintain fair competition in markets principally within the territorial boundaries of nation-states. National competition law usually does not cover activity beyond territorial borders unless it has significant effects at the nation-state level. Countries may allow for extraterritorial jurisdiction in competition cases based on so-called "effects doctrine". The protection of international competition is governed by international competition agreements.

== Overview ==
Competition law is the field of law that promotes and maintains market competition by regulating anti-competitive practices by companies. In some jurisdictions, such as the United States, competition law is known as antitrust law because of the historical practice of "trust busting" monopolistic trusts. It is sometimes also known by reference to its functions, for example, as "anti-monopoly law".

The aims of competition law are to combat economic cartels, prevent market abuse, regulate mergers and acquisitions, encourage innovation, protect consumers, and increase overall economic productivity. Competition law is rooted in the field of industrial organisation in economics, which studies the interaction between market structure, firm behaviour, and market power, including factors such as barriers to entry, economies of scale, and network effects. To control market power, judges and other legal officials have to rely on economic analysis, often relying upon or working with economists to do so.

=== History ===
Early forms of competition law were enacted during the Roman Republic and, later, the Roman Empire. In continental Europe, competition principles developed in the medieval lex mercatoria, while Medieval England also enacted a number of statutes controlling trade practices, with the common law courts creating a number of competition law doctrines that remain to this day.

Major developments to competition law occurred with the growing rise of the market economy, industrialization, and modern capitalism. Throughout the 18th and 19th centuries, the idea that dominant private companies or legal monopolies could excessively restrict trade led to legal reforms in Europe. However, following the Panic of 1873, ideas of competition lost favor, and it was felt that companies had to co-operate by forming cartels to withstand huge pressures on prices and profits.

While the development of competition law stalled in Europe during the late 19th century, in 1889 Canada enacted what is considered the first competition statute of modern times. The Act for the Prevention and Suppression of Combinations formed in restraint of Trade was passed one year before the United States enacted the Sherman Act of 1890. During the early 20th century, legal trusts were employed by business conglomerates to establish monopolies, which led to the development of "antitrust law" in the United States.

As of 2020, over 140 competition law regimes have been established. A majority of these competition law systems were adopted in the past 30 years, following the collapse of the Soviet Union and the expansion of the European Union. Currently competition authorities of many states closely co-operate, on an everyday basis, with foreign counterparts in their enforcement efforts, in such key areas as information and evidence sharing.

=== Rationale ===
"Corporations are creatures of the State, and the public safety requires that their conduct and functions shall be always controlled by their creator. They must be not only subordinated to the laws to which natural persons must bow, but they must be compelled to serve the public purposes for which they are created, and for which alone they should be permitted to live. Monopoly is bad enough in private hands, but it is a menace to all human rights when entrusted to artificial monsters uncontrolled by law and incapable of moral restraint."

— Future Congressman James G. Maguire in a speech given during the 1880 United States presidential election

Whilst competition law aims to improve economic efficiency by maintaining competitive rates and levels of productions, it is nonetheless possible, under some circumstances, for anticompetitive practices to increase welfare, or for competition law to decrease efficiency and increase costs to consumers.

=== Sources of law ===
The English common law of restraint of trade is sometimes regarded as the direct predecessor to modern competition law. English courts subsequently decided a range of cases which gradually developed competition related case law, which eventually were transformed into statute. For example, in 1889, Canada enacted what is considered the first competition statute of modern times: The Act for the Prevention and Suppression of Combinations formed in restraint of Trade. A year later, the United States enacted the Sherman Act of 1890.

Modern competition law comprises both national and international sources of law. National competition law usually does not have extraterritorial jurisdiction, unless the economic activity has had a significant national impact, a principle known as the effects doctrine. International competition law, such as European Union competition law, may have cross-jurisdictional or supranational effect, which may include criminal sanctions.

There is considerable controversy among WTO members, in green and blue, whether competition law should form part of the agreements.

In 1947, the General Agreement on Tariffs and Trade (GATT) was adopted. In 1994, the World Trade Organization (WTO) was created, establishing a range of limited provisions on various cross-border competition issues on a sector specific basis. Various proposals have been made historically for the establishment of a global antitrust code, but there remains, at present, no global competition law. While incapable of enforcement itself, the International Competition Network (ICN) is a way for national authorities to coordinate their own enforcement activities.

== Doctrine ==
For competition law to intervene into business activity, there must be a significant threat to market competition, consumer welfare, or economic efficiency. Competition law aims to control a number of business practices, including monopolies and market dominance, abusive conduct, mergers and acquisitions (including horizontal and vertical agreements), and subsidies.

An early stage in assessing competition law cases is the determination of the relevant market in which competition occurs, for the purposes of microeconomic analysis of factors such as market elasticity, price, and substitute goods. Under the supranational EU law, a relevant market is the intersection of both the relevant product market and the relevant geographic market. The SSNIP test is usually used to define markets via assessment of demand-side substitution.

After defining the market, the courts may inquire as to whether a monopolization (in US law) or market dominance (in EU law) has arisen. In the United States, monopoly pricing is not inherently regulated, whereas EU law considers it an antitrust offence. Even where there is no monopolistic or dominant abuse, a company may be sanctioned if they acted abusively, for example, in collusion or cartelism.

=== Abusive conduct and abuse of market position ===
Competition laws across jurisdictions also prohibit certain categories of abusive conduct, although the categories may differ by jurisdiction, and the list of prohibited conduct are often variable and open to new additions. Common forms of abuse as recognised across jurisdictions include the unfair tying of one product into the sale of another, causing a restriction of consumer choice and depriving competitors of outlets; exclusive dealing or refusal to deal with certain vendors; dividing territories among different companies to reduce competition in those territories; price fixing among cartels; and the deprivation of essential facilities.

Forms of abuse relating directly to pricing include price exploitation. It is difficult to prove at what point a dominant firm's prices become "exploitative" and this category of abuse is rarely found. A rarer issue is that of predatory pricing, the practice of dropping prices of a product so much that one's smaller competitors cannot cover their costs and fall out of business, although it is not impossible for such practices to be found. In the EU case of France Telecom SA v. Commission, a broadband internet company was forced to pay $13.9 million for dropping its prices below its own production costs. It had "no interest in applying such prices except that of eliminating competitors", and it was being cross-subsidized to capture the majority share of a booming market. A third category of pricing abuse is price discrimination. An example of this could be a company offering rebates to industrial customers who export their sugar, but not to customers who are selling their goods in the same market.

==== Collusion ====
Collusion is a deceitful agreement or secret cooperation between two or more parties to limit open competition by deceiving, misleading or defrauding others of their legal right. Collusion is not always considered illegal. It can be used to attain objectives forbidden by law; for example, by defrauding or gaining an unfair market advantage. It is an agreement among firms or individuals to divide a market, set prices, limit production or limit opportunities. It can involve "price or wage fixing, kickbacks, or misrepresenting the independence of the relationship between the colluding parties". In legal terms, all acts effected by collusion are considered void.

==== Cartel ====
A cartel is a group of independent market participants who collaborate with each other and avoid competing with each other in order to improve their profits and dominate the market. They seek to limit competition, fix prices, and increase prices by creating artificial shortages through low production quotas, stockpiling, and marketing quotas. Cartel behaviors can be either legal or illegal, but jurisdictions frequently consider cartelization to be anti-competitive behavior, leading them to outlaw or curtail cartel practices. Anti-trust law targets cartel behavior in markets.

=== Mergers and acquisitions ===
Competition law regulates mergers and acquisitions prospectively rather than retrospectively in order to prevent potential monopolies and market domination, with companies intending to merge often needing to gain authorization from the state before they can do so. When assessing whether a merger or acquisition can be allowed, courts and other officials consider whether there will be a significant effect on competition. This is often done through the consideration of empirical evidence.

Although mergers can produce economic benefits such as reduced transaction costs and increased economies of scale, economies of scope, and economies of density, they also result in the concentration of economic power. As such, courts often examine include the Herfindahl-Hirschman Index, the propensity of oligopoly via economic links, the transparency of a market, and barriers to entry, balancing the potential noncompetitive effects of a merger against the possible economic efficiencies and scientific discoveries that may also arise as a result. Another possible defense might be that the firm which is being taken over is about to fail or go insolvent, and so the resulting competitive state would not be lessened. This is known as the "failing firm defense" and has been a regular feature of the U.S. Horizontal Merger Guidelines since 1982.

Mergers vertically in the market are rarely of concern, although in AOL/Time Warner the European Commission required that a joint venture with a competitor Bertelsmann be ceased. EU authorities have also focused on the effect of conglomerate mergers, where companies acquire a large portfolio of related products, though without necessarily dominant shares in any individual market.

=== Public finance, subsidies, and aid ===
Bid rigging in public procurement is often illegal, across jurisdictions, in corruption law and often competition law.

=== Intersection with other areas of law ===
==== Contract law ====
Competition law may act to restrict the kinds of contracts that can be formed within parties, prohibiting anticompetitive practices such as exclusive dealing retail agreements.

==== Employment law ====
Competition law may restrict occupational licensing. Certification bodies, for example, can engage also anti-competitive actions, via medical certification bodies reducing competition in health care and thus worsening health economics and health care quality.

Non-compete clauses may also be illegal in competition law.

==== Intellectual property ====
Competition law has become increasingly intertwined with intellectual property, such as copyright, trademarks, patents, industrial design rights and in some jurisdictions trade secrets. It is believed that promotion of innovation through enforcement of intellectual property rights may both promote and limit competitiveness. The question then turns on whether it is legal to acquire monopoly through accumulation of intellectual property rights, In which case the judgment decides between giving preference to intellectual property rights or to competitiveness.

=== Defences ===
Defences to competition law litigation include ones grounded in constitutional rights (e.g. the US Noerr-Pennington doctrine), sovereign immunity (e.g. the US Parker immunity doctrine), and copyright misuse.

=== Remedies ===
Competition and antitrust law can require a large conglomerate to be broken up into separate smaller companies. For example, the United States required American Telephone & Telegraph (AT&T) and Standard Oil to break up. Additional approaches to prevent monopoly profits include local-loop unbundling, merger control and monopoly profits taxes.

=== Principles ===
==== Consumer welfare standard ====
Across many jurisdictions, a broad principle of competition law that has been applied is the "consumer welfare standard", regards the impact of business practices on consumer welfare as an important if not decisive factor in determining whether to find against the business. Despite its name, the consumer welfare standard, as originally expressed by conservative legal scholar Robert Bork, does not strictly aim to maximise consumer welfare but the welfare of both producers and consumers. The use of the consumer welfare standard as a decisive test for whether the law should intervene has been criticised for inappropriately restricting the scope of competition law to effects on prices to consumers instead of more broadly considering issues of fairness, efficiency, and justice. Today, most jurisdictions agree that the consumer welfare standard is not solely decisive in competition law cases but is one of a number of factors the courts should consider.

==== Policy and juridical decision making ====
The creation of competition law and policy in statute and other sources of law generally aims to strike a balance between clarity and discretion, the former allowing businesses and officials to understand and apply the law without unintended consequences and the latter allowing officials to decide between a range options that have different economic and political implications.

The application of competition law also balances between a number of factors beyond a firm's market share or the mere existence of a monopoly, such as the extent to which the firm abuses its monopoly power or to which consumers are paying excessive prices. Under EU law, for example, very large market shares raise a rebuttable presumption that a firm is dominant. If a firm has a dominant position, then there is "a special responsibility not to allow its conduct to impair competition on the common market". Another deciding factor in determining an abusive monopoly is if the firm behaves "to an appreciable extent independently of its competitors, customers and ultimately of its consumer".

== Economics ==
Modern economists and competition lawyers recognise that market failure may occur for a number of reasons and generally agree that intervention is justified if government failure can be avoided. Economists acknowledge that perfect competition is seldom observed in the real world and so aim for what is called "workable competition".

Contemporary economic developments have challenged conventional industrial organisation models and the efficacy of conventional competition law tools. As a result, modern directions of competition law include new and increased focuses on information economics, digital economy, and platform economy, including considerations of enforcement speed, dynamic models of competition, competitive harms beyond the consumer, network effects, winner-take-all markets, market dominating firms, monopsony powers, transaction costs, non-monetary costs, value of information, and attention costs. Large platform companies tend to engage in complex and multidimensional strategic choices that can be difficult to subject to contemporary regulations. For example, Amazon and Alibaba can change market structure by connecting geographically dispersed buyers and suppliers through centralised infrastructure, imposing terms of participation that privately regulate the market structure and the governance of the platform itself. Artificial intelligence can pose challenges in preventing a winner-take-all market due to the positive feedback of recursive self-improvement.

== By country ==
=== Asia ===
In many of Asia's developing countries, including India, Competition law is considered a tool to stimulate economic growth. In Korea and Japan, the competition law prevents certain forms of conglomerates. In addition, competition law has promoted fairness in China and Indonesia as well as international integration in Vietnam. Hong Kong's Competition Ordinance came into force in the year 2015.

==== India ====
During India's economic liberalization, the Government of India enacted competition laws such as the Monopolies and Restrictive Trade Practices Act of 1969, which became obsolete in 1991 and replaced by the Competition Act, 2002. The Competition Commission of India, is the quasi judicial body established for enforcing provisions of the 2002 act.

==== China ====
The Anti Monopoly Law of China came into effect in 2008. For years, it was enforced by three different branches of government, but since 2018 its enforcement has been the responsibility of the State Administration for Market Regulation. The People's Daily reported that the law had generated 11 billion RMB of penalties between 2008 and 2018.

==== ASEAN member states ====
As part of the creation of the ASEAN Economic Community, the member states of the Association of South-East Asian Nations (ASEAN) pledged to enact competition laws and policies by the end of 2015. Today, all ten member states have general competition legislation in place. While there remains differences between regimes (for example, over merger control notification rules, or leniency policies for whistle-blowers), and it is unlikely that there will be a supranational competition authority for ASEAN (akin to the European Union), there is a clear trend towards increase in infringement investigations or decisions on cartel enforcement.

=== Americas ===
==== United States antitrust ====
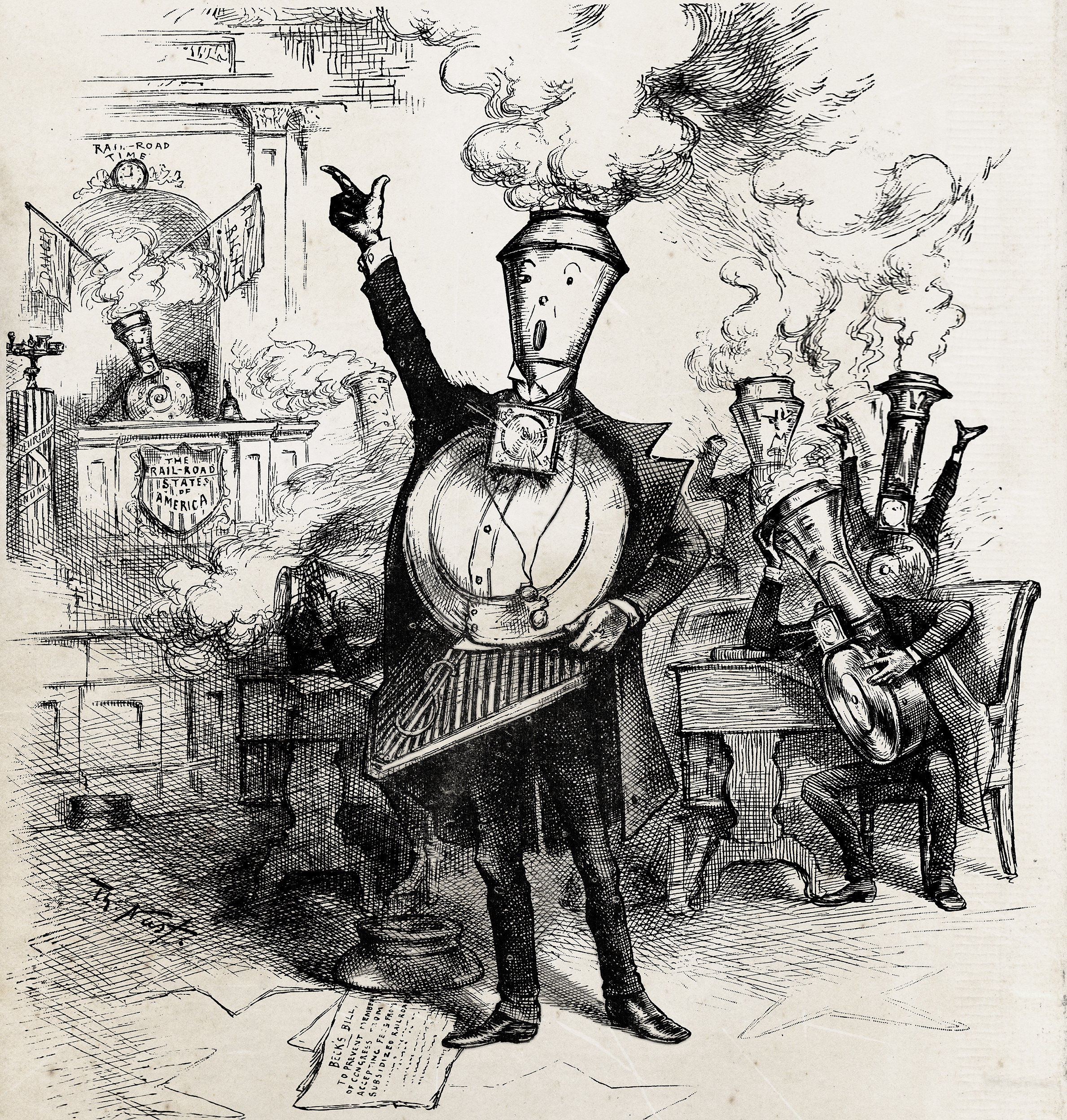
Senatorial Round House by Thomas Nast, 1886

Section 1 of the Sherman Act declared illegal "every contract, in the form of trust or otherwise, or conspiracy, in restraint of trade or commerce among the several States, or with foreign nations". Section 2 prohibits monopolies, or attempts and conspiracies to monopolize. Following the enactment in 1890 US court applies these principles to business and markets. Courts applied the Act without consistent economic analysis until 1914, when it was complemented by the Clayton Act which specifically prohibited exclusive dealing agreements, particularly tying agreements and interlocking directorates, and mergers achieved by purchasing stock. From 1915 onwards the rule of reason analysis was frequently applied by courts to competition cases. However, the period was characterized by the lack of competition law enforcement. From 1936 to 1972 courts' application of antitrust law was dominated by the structure-conduct-performance paradigm of the Harvard School. From 1973 to 1991, the enforcement of antitrust law was based on efficiency explanations as the Chicago School became dominant, and through legal writings such as Judge Robert Bork's book The Antitrust Paradox. Since 1992 game theory has frequently been used in antitrust cases.

With the Hart–Scott–Rodino Antitrust Improvements Act of 1976, mergers and acquisitions came into additional scrutiny from U.S. regulators. Under the act, parties must make a pre-merger notification to the U.S. Department of Justice and Federal Trade Commission prior to the completion of a transaction. As of February 2, 2021, the FTC reduced the Hart-Scott-Rodino reporting threshold to $92 million in combined assets for the transaction.

==== Canada ====
Canada's competition laws are primarily governed by the Competition Act, a federal statute that regulates business practices to maintain fair competition in the marketplace. The Act includes both criminal and civil provisions aimed at preventing anti-competitive behavior such as conspiracies, bid-rigging, abuse of dominance, and deceptive marketing. The Competition Bureau, an independent law enforcement agency, administers and enforces the Act, with cases adjudicated by the Competition Tribunal and courts.

The evolution of competition law in Canada dates back to the Anti-Combines Act of 1889, one of the earliest antitrust laws worldwide, which prohibited business conspiracies and agreements that restrained trade. Over time, this early law was replaced and updated by various laws including the Combines Investigation Acts of the early 20th century. The modern Competition Act replaced the Combines Investigation Act in 1986, introducing provisions for civil review of mergers and anti-competitive practices under a balance of probabilities standard, along with maintaining criminal sanctions for serious offenses like conspiracy and bid-rigging.

Since then, the Act has undergone multiple amendments to improve enforcement, clarify provisions, and adapt to new market challenges. While initially enforcement was exclusive to government authorities, more recent amendments have allowed for limited private rights of action. The Competition Act and its enforcement framework emphasize preventing undue lessening of competition while balancing economic efficiency and consumer protection.

=== Europe ===
==== European Union law ====
Competition law gained new recognition in Europe in the inter-war years, with Germany enacting its first anti-cartel law in 1923, followed by Sweden and Norway adopting similar laws in 1925 and 1926, respectively. However, with the Great Depression of 1929 competition law disappeared from Europe and was only revived following the Second World War. During this period, the United Kingdom and Germany, following pressure from the United States, became the first European countries to adopt fully fledged competition laws. At a regional level EU competition law has its origins in the European Coal and Steel Community (ECSC) agreement between France, Italy, Belgium, the Netherlands, Luxembourg and Germany in 1951 following the Second World War. The agreement aimed to prevent Germany from re-establishing dominance in the production of coal and steel as it was felt that this dominance had contributed to the outbreak of the war. Article 65 of the agreement banned cartels and article 66 made provisions for concentrations, or mergers, and the abuse of a dominant position by companies. This was the first time that competition law principles were included in a plurilateral regional agreement and established the trans-European model of competition law. In 1957 competition rules were included in the Treaty of Rome, also known as the EC Treaty, which established the European Economic Community (EEC). The Treaty of Rome established the enactment of competition law as one of the main aims of the EEC through the "institution of a system ensuring that competition in the common market is not distorted". The two central provisions on EU competition law were article 85, which prohibited anti-competitive agreements, subject to some exemptions, and article 86 prohibiting the abuse of a dominant position. The treaty also established principles on competition law for member states, with article 90 covering public undertakings, and article 92 making provisions on state aid. Regulations on mergers were not included, as member states could not establish consensus on the issue at the time.

Today, the Treaty of Lisbon prohibits anti-competitive agreements in Article 101(1), including price fixing. According to Article 101(2) any such agreements are automatically void. Article 101(3) establishes exemptions, if the collusion is for distributional or technological innovation, gives consumers a "fair share" of the benefit and does not include unreasonable restraints that risk eliminating competition anywhere (or compliant with the general principle of European Union law of proportionality). Article 102 prohibits the abuse of dominant position, such as price discrimination and exclusive dealing. Regulation 139/2004/EC governs mergers between firms. The general test is whether a concentration (i.e. merger or acquisition) with a community dimension (i.e. affects a number of EU member states) might significantly impede effective competition. Articles 106 and 107 provide that member states' right to deliver public services may not be obstructed, but that otherwise public enterprises must adhere to the same competition principles as companies. Article 107 lays down a general rule that the state may not aid or subsidize private parties in distortion of free competition and provides exemptions for charities, regional development objectives and in the event of a natural disaster.

Leading ECJ cases on competition law include Consten & Grundig v Commission and United Brands v Commission.

==== Armenia ====
According to The World Bank's "Republic of Armenia Accumulation, Competition, and Connectivity Global Competition" report which was published in 2013, the Global Competitiveness Index suggests that Armenia ranks lowest among ECA (Europe and Central Asia) countries in the effectiveness of anti-monopoly policy and the intensity of competition. This low ranking somehow explains the low employment and low incomes in Armenia.

== See also ==
- Consumer protection
- Cartel theory
- The History of the Standard Oil Company (book)
- Institute for Consumer Antitrust Studies
- Irish Competition law
- List of competition regulators
- List of countries' copyright length
- Relevant market
- Resale price maintenance
- Sherman Antitrust Act
- SSNIP
- Megacorporation
