= Effective competition =

Alternative to the economic theory of perfect competition

Effective competition is a concept first proposed by John Maurice Clark, then under the name of workable competition,as a "workable" alternative to the economic theory of perfect competition, since perfect competition is seldom observed in the real world.

His proposal resulted in extensive debate in the economic literature over the next several decades in which George W. Stocking Sr., George Stigler, Jesse W. Markham, Joe S. Bain, and many others participated. No consensus has yet been reached over which of many potential criteria should be used to judge competition to be effective, but as an alternative to identifying specific structural criteria by which to constitute effectiveness or workability, Jesse W. Markham suggested the following definition:

An industry may be judged to be workably competitive when, after the structural characteristics of its market and the dynamic forces that shaped them have been thoroughly examined, there is no clearly indicated change than can be effected through public policy measures that would result in greater social gains than social losses.

Despite the lack of consensus in the literature, the concept is often used in antitrust enforcement and public policy analysis, as a method for measuring and ensuring adequate levels of competitive performance in markets which may not be ideally structured. Charles F. Phillips Jr. noted, "Workable or effective competition may result from conditions that are less exacting than those demanded for perfection."
