= Conglomerate merger =

Type of merger

A conglomerate merger is "any merger that is not horizontal or vertical; in general, it is the combination of firms in different industries or firms operating in different geographic areas". Conglomerate mergers can serve various purposes, including extending corporate territories and extending a product range. One example of a conglomerate merger was the merger between the Walt Disney Company and the American Broadcasting Company.

Because a conglomerate merger is one between two strategically unrelated firms, it is unlikely that the economic benefits will be generated for the target or the bidder. As such, conglomerate mergers seldom occur today. However, conglomerate mergers were popular in the U.S. in the 1960s and 1970s. Many conglomerate mergers are divested shortly after they are completed.
