= Vertical restraints =

Vertical restraints are competition restrictions in agreements between firms or individuals at different levels of the production and distribution process. Vertical restraints are to be distinguished from so-called "horizontal restraints", which are found in agreements between horizontal competitors. Vertical restraints can take numerous forms, ranging from a requirement that dealers accept returns of a manufacturer's product, to resale price maintenance agreements setting the minimum or maximum price that dealers can charge for the manufacturer's product.

So-called "intrabrand restraints" such as resale price maintenance govern products made by a particular manufacturer, while "interbrand restraints" regulate a dealer's or manufacturer's relationship with its trading partner's rivals (e.g., "English clauses"). Quintessential examples of interbrand restraints include tying contracts, whereby a purchaser agrees to purchase a second product as a condition of obtaining a so-called "tying" product, and exclusive dealing agreements, whereby a dealer agrees not to purchase products from suppliers that are rivals of the manufacturer.

== United States antitrust law ==
Section 1 of the Sherman Antitrust Act governs all the vertical restraints involving interstate commerce in the United States. Section 3 of the Clayton Act governs interbrand restraints involving the sale of "goods". Finally, Section 2 of the Sherman Act governs restraints entered by monopolists. For several decades, courts were quite hostile to many vertical restraints, declaring them unlawful per se or nearly so. More recently, courts have reversed course and held that most such restraints should be analyzed under the rule of reason.

== English clause ==
An "English clause" is a contractual provision requiring a buyer to report any better offer to his supplier and allowing him to accept such offer only when the supplier does not match it. An "English clause" is a vertical restraint under competition law, and can be expected to have the same effect as a single branding obligation, especially when the buyer has to reveal who makes the better offer.
