= Horizontal integration =

Business process

A diagram illustrating horizontal integration and contrasting it with vertical integration

Horizontal integration is the process of a company increasing production of goods or services at the same level of the value chain, in the same industry. A company may do this via internal expansion or through mergers and acquisitions.

The process can lead to monopoly if a company captures the vast majority of the market for that product or service. Benefits of horizontal integration include: increasing economies of scale, expanding an existing market, and improving product differentiation.

Horizontal integration contrasts with vertical integration, where companies integrate multiple stages of production of a small number of production units.

== Horizontal alliance ==
Horizontal integration is related to horizontal alliance (also known as horizontal cooperation). However, in the case of a horizontal alliance, the partnering companies set up a contract, but remain independent. For example, Raue & Wieland (2015) describe the example of legally independent logistics service providers who cooperate. Such an alliance relates to competition.

== Aspects ==
Benefits of horizontal integration to both the firm and society may include economies of scale and economies of scope. For the firm, horizontal integration may provide a strengthened presence in the reference market. This means that with the merger, two firms would then be able to produce more revenue than one firm alone. It may also allow the horizontally integrated firm to engage in monopoly pricing, which is disadvantageous to society as a whole and which may cause regulators to ban or constrain horizontal integration. Strategies around horizontal mergers often relate to revenue production, reducing market entrants or expanding into new markets. The three forms of horizontal integration are mergers, acquisitions and internal expansion.

Mergers:

Mergers and acquisitions (M&A) refer to the consolidation of companies or assets through various financial transactions, such as mergers, acquisitions, and consolidations. M&A activities can be an effective way for companies to expand their operations, diversify their product or service offerings, and increase their market share. These activities can also lead to cost savings, increased efficiencies, and access to new technologies or markets.

Mergers involve the combination of two or more companies to form a new entity. This can occur through a stock-for-stock transaction, where shareholders of both companies receive shares in the new entity based on a predetermined exchange ratio. Alternatively, a cash merger can occur, where one company purchases another using cash or other financial instruments.

Acquisitions:

Acquisitions, on the other hand, involve the purchase of one company by another. This can occur through a friendly acquisition, where the target company agrees to the acquisition and its shareholders receive compensation for their shares. Alternatively, a hostile takeover can occur, where the acquiring company purchases a controlling stake in the target company without its approval.

Consolidations refer to the combination of two or more companies to form a single entity without the creation of a new entity. This can occur through the merger of equals, where two companies of equal size and strength combine forces, or through the acquisition of a smaller company by a larger one.

M&A activities can have a significant impact on various stakeholders, including shareholders, employees, customers, and suppliers. Shareholders can benefit from increased stock prices and dividends, while employees may face job losses or changes to their employment terms. Customers and suppliers may also be affected by changes to product or service offerings and supplier relationships.

Regulatory bodies play an important role in overseeing M&A activities to ensure they do not violate antitrust laws and do not harm competition in the marketplace. The approval of mergers and acquisitions may also require approval from government agencies or industry regulators.

Overall, mergers and acquisitions can be an effective strategy for companies to achieve growth and gain a competitive advantage. However, careful consideration of the potential benefits and drawbacks, as well as regulatory compliance, is essential to ensure a successful outcome for all stakeholders involved.

Internal Expansion:

In addition to mergers and acquisitions, companies can also pursue internal expansion through horizontal integration. This involves expanding their operations and product or service offerings within their existing industry by acquiring or developing new capabilities.

Horizontal integration can take various forms, including expanding through new product development, expanding geographically, or acquiring competitors or suppliers. This strategy can enable companies to increase their market share and achieve economies of scale by leveraging existing resources and capabilities.

Internal expansion through horizontal integration can also involve the integration of different business functions, such as production, marketing, and sales, to streamline operations and increase efficiency. This can result in cost savings and improved profitability.

However, there are potential drawbacks to internal expansion through horizontal integration. It can be costly and time-consuming to develop new capabilities or expand into new markets, and there is a risk that these efforts may not be successful. Additionally, companies may face increased competition and regulatory scrutiny as they expand their operations.

Overall, internal expansion through horizontal integration can be a viable strategy for companies looking to achieve growth and gain a competitive advantage. However, it requires careful planning, execution, and management to ensure success and mitigate potential risks. Companies should also consider the potential benefits and drawbacks of this strategy compared to other growth strategies, such as mergers and acquisitions.

== Media terms ==
Media critics, such as Robert W. McChesney, have noted that the current trend within the entertainment industry has been toward the increased concentration of media ownership into the hands of a smaller number of transmedia and transnational conglomerates. Media is seen to amass in center where wealthy individuals have the ability to purchase such ventures (e.g., Rupert Murdoch).

That emerged are new strategies for content development and distribution designed to increase the "synergy" between the different divisions of the same company. Studios seek content that can move fluidly across media channels.

== Examples ==
An example of horizontal integration in the food industry was the Heinz and Kraft Foods merger. On 25 March 2015, Heinz and Kraft merged into one company, with the deal valued at $46 billion. Both produce processed food for the consumer market.

On 9 December 2013, Sysco agreed to acquire US Foods but on 24 June 2015, the federal judge ruled against the deal saying that such merger would control 75% of the U.S. foodservice industry and that will stifle competition. It would have been horizontal integration, as both distribute food to restaurants, healthcare, and educational facilities.

On 16 November 2015, Marriott International announced that it would acquire Starwood for $13.6 billion, creating the world's largest hotel chain. The acquisition was finalized on 23 September 2016.

The AB-Inbev acquisition of SAB Miller for $107 Billion, which completed in 2016, is one of the biggest deals of all time.

On 1 November 2017, Centurylink bought Level 3 Communications for $34 billion, and incorporated Level 3 as part of Centurylink.

On 14 December 2017, The Walt Disney Company announced that they were to acquire 21st Century Fox for $52.4 billion in stock, which included the famed 20th Century Fox film studio, FX Networks, and a 30% stake in Hulu. Both companies produced and distributed films and television series, as well as each owning a 30% stake in Hulu. Due to Disney's ownership of ABC, the acquisition did not include the Fox Broadcasting Company, as the Federal Communications Commission's rules prohibited a single company from owning multiple of the four major broadcast networks; the Fox Broadcasting Company was instead planned to be spun-off into a new company tentatively named "New Fox". The acquisition closed on March 20, 2019, for an increased cash-and-stock offer of $71.3 billion; the assets that were not acquired by Disney, including the Fox Broadcasting Company, were spun-off into Fox Corporation.

== See also ==
- Economies of scale
- Horizontal market
- List of economics topics
- List of management topics
- List of marketing topics
- Monopoly
- Strategic management
- Target market
- Vertical integration
