= Small but significant and non-transitory increase in price =

Concept in competition law

In competition law, before deciding whether companies have significant market power which would justify government intervention, the test of small but significant and non-transitory increase in price (SSNIP) is used to define the relevant market in a consistent way. It is an alternative to ad hoc determination of the relevant market by arguments about product similarity.

The SSNIP test is crucial in competition law cases accusing abuse of dominance and in approving or blocking mergers. Competition regulating authorities and other actuators of antitrust law intend to prevent market failure caused by cartel, oligopoly, monopoly, or other forms of market dominance.

== History ==
In 1982 the U.S. Department of Justice Merger Guidelines introduced the SSNIP test as a new method for defining markets and for measuring market power directly. In the EU it was used for the first time in the Nestlé/Perrier case in 1992 and has been officially recognized by the European Commission in its "Commission's Notice for the Definition of the Relevant Market" in 1997.

The original concept is believed to have been proposed first in 1959 by economist David Morris Adelman of the Aston University. Several other individuals formulated, apparently independently, similar conceptual approaches during the 1970s. The SSNIP approach was implemented by F. M. Scherer in three antitrust cases: in a 1972 Justice Department attempt to enjoin the merger of Associated Brewing Co. and G. W. Heileman Co., in 1975 during hearings on the U.S. government's monopolization case against IBM, and in a 1981 proceeding precipitated by Marathon Oil Company's effort to avert takeover by Mobil Oil Corporation. Scherer also proposed the basic concept underlying SSNIP along with limitations posed by what has come to be known as "the cellophane fallacy" in the second (1980) edition of his industrial organization textbook. Historical retrospectives suggest that early proponents were unaware of other individuals' conceptual proposals.

== Measurement ==
The SSNIP test seeks to identify the smallest relevant market within which a hypothetical monopolist or cartel could impose a profitable significant increase in price. The relevant market consists of a "catalogue" of goods and/or services which are considered substitutes by the customer. Such a catalogue is considered "worth monopolizing" if, should only one single supplier provide it, that supplier could profitably increase its price without its customers turning away and choosing other goods and services from other suppliers.

The application of the SSNIP test involves interviewing consumers regarding buying decisions and determining whether a hypothetical monopolist or cartel could profit from a price increase of 5% for at least one year (assuming that "the terms of sale of all other products are held constant"). If sufficient numbers of buyers are likely to switch to alternative products and the lost sales would make such price increase unprofitable, then the hypothetical market should not be considered a relevant market for the basis of litigation or regulation. Therefore, another, larger, basket of products is proposed for a hypothetical monopolist to control and the SSNIP test is performed on that relevant market.

The SSNIP test can be applied by estimating empirically the critical elasticity of demand. In the case of linear demand, information on firms' price-cost margins is sufficient for the calculation. If the pre-merger elasticity of demand exceeds the critical elasticity, then the decline in sales arising from the price increase will be sufficiently large to render the price increase unprofitable and the products concerned do not constitute the relevant market.

An alternative method for applying the SSNIP test where demand elasticities cannot be estimated, involves estimating the "critical loss." The critical loss is defined as the maximum sales loss that could be sustained as a result of the price increase without making the price increase unprofitable. Where the likely loss of sales to the hypothetical monopolist (cartel) is less than the Critical Loss, then a 5% price increase would be profitable and the market is defined.

== Example ==
The test consists of observing whether a small increase in price (in the range of 5 to 10 percent) would provoke a significant number of consumers to switch to another product (in fact, substitute product). In other words, it is designed to analyse whether that increase in price would be profitable or if, instead, it would just induce substitution, making it unprofitable.

In general, one uses databases from the firms which may include data on variables such as costs, prices, revenue or sales and over a sufficiently long period (generally over at least two years).

In economic terms, what the SSNIP test does is to calculate the residual elasticity of demand of the firm. That is, how a change in prices by the firm affects its own demand.

=== First phase ===
As an example, let's suppose the following situation for a firm:

- Price = 10
- Sales = 1000
- Variable cost per unit = 5

In this case, the firm would make profits equal to 5000: $\mathrm{Price} \times \mathrm{Sales} - \mathrm{Variable\ cost} \times \mathrm{Sales}$.

Now suppose the firm decides to increase its price by a 10 percent, which would imply that the new price would be 11 (10 percent increase). Suppose that the new situation facing the firm is therefore:

- Price = 11
- Sales = 800
- Variable cost per unit = 5

In this case, the firm would make profits equal to 4800: $\mathrm{Price} \times \mathrm{Sales} - \mathrm{Variable\ cost} \times \mathrm{Sales}$.

As can be seen, such an increase in prices would induce a certain substitution for our hypothetical firm, in fact, 200 units less will be sold. This may be so because some consumers have started to buy a substitute product, the same consumers have bought a smaller quantity of the product given its price increase or maybe because they have stopped buying that type of product.

If we want to know whether such price increase has been profitable, we should solve the following equation:
$\mathrm{Profits} = \mathrm{Price} \times \mathrm{Sales} - \mathrm{Variable\ cost\ per\ unit} \times \mathrm{Sales} = 4800.$

In our example, the increase in price produces too much consumer substitution which is not compensated by the increase in price nor the reduction in costs. Overall, the firm would make less profits (4800 compared to 5000). In other words, there are other substitute products that should be included in the relevant market and the product of the firm does not constitute by itself a separate relevant market. The "market" formed by this only product is not "worth monopolising" as an increase in prices would not be profitable. The investigation should continue by including new products which we may guess are substitutes of the one under investigation.

=== Second phase ===
We already know that the previous product is not by itself a relevant market because there do exist other substitute products. Let's suppose that the previous firm (A) tells us that it considers as competitors the products of B and C. In this case, in the second phase we should include these products to our analysis and repeat the exercise.

The situation can be described as follows:

Price A = 10;	Sales A = 1000;	Variable cost per unit A = 5
Price B = 13;	Sales B = 800;	Variable cost per unit B = 4
Price C = 9;	Sales C = 1100;	Variable cost per unit C = 4

Given that we want to know if products A, B and C constitute a relevant market, the exercise would consist in supposing that an hypothetical monopolist X would control all three products. In that case, the monopolist would make profits of:
$10 \times 1000 - 5 \times 1000 + 13 \times 800 - 4 \times 800 + 9 \times 1100 - 4 \times 1100 = 17700$

Now suppose that monopolist X decides to increase the price of product A, maintaining the price of B and C constant. Suppose that a 10 percent increase in the price of A provokes the following situation:

Price A = 11;	Sales A = 800;	Variable cost per unit A = 5
Price B = 13;	Sales B = 900;	Variable cost per unit B = 4
Price C = 9;	Sales C = 1200;	Variable cost per unit C = 4

This means that the price increase of A would provoke that 200 units less of A be sold and instead, 100 more units of B and C will be sold respectively. Given that our hypothetical monopolist controls all three products, its profits will be:
$11 \times 800 - 5 \times 800 + 13 \times 900 - 4 \times 900 + 9 \times 1200 - 4 \times 1200 = 18900$

As can be seen, the monopolist controlling A, B and C would profitably increase the price of A by 10 percent, in other words, these three products do constitute a market "worth monopolising" and therefore constitutes a relevant market. This result is because X controls all three products which are the only substitutes of A. Thus, X knows that even if its increase in price of A will generate some substitution, a significant share of these consumers will end up buying other products which he controls, therefore overall, his profits will not be reduced but rather increased.

If we had found that such an increase would not have been profitable, we should further include new products which we may imagine are substitutes in a third phase until we arrive at a situation in which such an increase in price would have been profitable, indicating that those products do constitute a relevant market.

== Limitations ==
Despite its widespread usage, the SSNIP test is not without problems. Specifically:

- In evaluating a merger of A and B, performing the SSNIP test on A's products will not necessarily yield the same relevant market as applying the SSNIP test on B's products (this presented a legal issue in the 2002 Bayer/Aventis Crop Science merger). So, a competition authority investigating A should only consider competitive pressure (or lack thereof) that B puts on A - reverse pressure from A to B is irrelevant.
- The SSNIP test relies on total losses in sales after a 5% price increase, not just substitutions to a particular competitor's product. Thus it includes sales losses due to outpricing by competitor 1, a more attractive deal by competitor 2, or to customers saving their money instead of spending it on any of those competitors' products. Mathematically speaking, what is important is the own-price elasticity of the good in question, not its cross-price elasticity relative to any other product. Cross-price elasticities can help determine what products are substitutes (high, positive cross-price elasticities) in succeeding iterations of the SSNIP test, but the attractiveness of controlling a market can only be evaluated with an own-price elasticity.
- In succeeding iterations of larger market control, the hypothetical price increase still only applies to the first product. The gains to the hypothetical owner of substitute products come from increasing the price of one base product and thus getting higher revenue from it and spillover from its competitors – not from increasing the price of the base product and the price for its competitors.
- The SSNIP test only measures competition based on price and thus cannot be considered a catch-all or fully sufficient tool for defining markets.

Furthermore, many economists have noted an important pitfall in the use of demand elasticities when inferring both the market power and the relevant market. The problem arises from the fact that economic theory predicts that any profit-maximizing firm will set its prices at a level where demand for its product is elastic. Therefore, when a monopolist sets its prices at a monopoly level it may happen that two products appear to be close substitutes whereas at competitive prices they are not. In other words, it may happen that using the SSNIP test one defines the relevant market too broadly, including products which are not substitutes.

This problem is known in the literature as the cellophane paradox after the celebrated DuPont case (U.S. v. E. I. du Pont). In this case, DuPont (a cellophane producer) argued that cellophane was not a separate relevant market since it competed with flexible packaging materials such as aluminum foil, wax paper and polyethylene. The problem was that DuPont, being the sole producer of cellophane, had set prices at the monopoly level, and it was at this level that consumers viewed those other products as substitutes. Instead, at the competitive level, consumers viewed cellophane as a unique relevant market (a small but significant increase in prices would not have them switching to goods like wax or the others). In the case, the Supreme Court of the United States failed to recognise that a high own-price elasticity may mean that a firm is already exercising monopoly power.

== See also ==
- Competition law
- Federal Trade Commission
- Local Loop Unbundling
- Monopoly
- European Commission
- United States Department of Justice Antitrust Division
- Relevant market
