= Price floor =

Government- or group-imposed price control

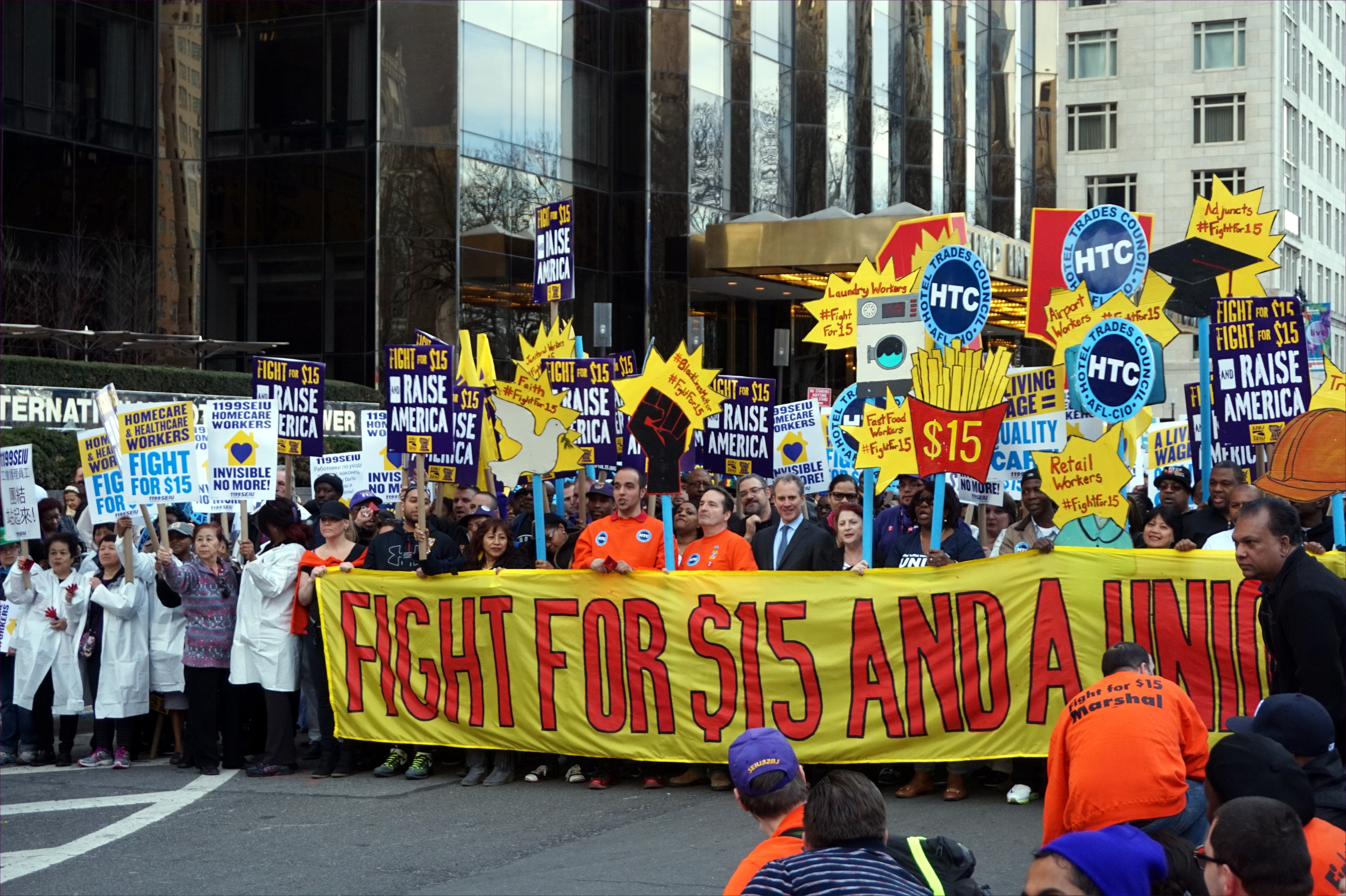
Protesters call for an increased legal minimum wage as part of the "Fight for $15" effort to require a $15 per hour minimum wage in 2015. A government-set minimum wage is a price floor on the price of labour.

A price floor is a government- or group-imposed price control or limit on how low a price can be charged for a product, good, commodity, or service. It is one type of price support; other types include supply regulation and guarantee government purchase price. A price floor must be higher than the equilibrium price in order to be effective. The equilibrium price, commonly called the "market price", is the price where economic forces such as supply and demand are balanced and in the absence of external influences the (equilibrium) values of economic variables will not change, often described as the point at which quantity demanded and quantity supplied are equal (in a perfectly competitive market). Governments use price floors to keep certain prices from going too low.

Two common price floors are minimum wage laws and supply management in Canadian agriculture. Other price floors include regulated US airfares prior to 1978 and minimum price per-drink laws for alcohol. While price floors are often imposed by governments, there are also price floors which are implemented by non-governmental organizations such as companies, such as the practice of resale price maintenance. With resale price maintenance, a manufacturer and its distributors agree that the distributors will sell the manufacturer's product at certain prices (resale price maintenance), at or above a price floor (minimum resale price maintenance) or at or below a price ceiling (maximum resale price maintenance). A related government- or group-imposed intervention, which is also a price control, is the price ceiling; it sets the maximum price that can legally be charged for a good or service, with a common government-imposed example being rent control.

== Effectiveness ==
An ineffective, non-binding price floor, below equilibrium price

A price floor could be set below the free-market equilibrium price. In the first graph at right, the dashed green line represents a price floor set below the free-market price. In this case, the floor has no practical effect. The government has mandated a minimum price, but the market already bears and is using a higher price, this is called a non-binding price floor.

An effective, binding price floor, causing a surplus (supply exceeds demand)

By contrast, in the second graph, the dashed green line represents a price floor set above the free-market price. In this case, the price floor has a measurable impact on the market. It ensures prices stay high, causing a surplus in the market.

In practice, many goods and services are not perfectly identical, real markets experience friction and hysteresis, different participants have different amounts of market power. As a result, prices vary from transaction to transaction. Price floors can thus affect the price of certain transactions but not others, even if they are below the average price. The market price can also vary over time, and a price floor can affect the market price during low periods.

== Effect on the market ==
A price floor set above the market equilibrium price has several side-effects. Consumers find they must now pay a higher price for the same product. As a result, they reduce their purchases, switch to substitutes (e.g., from butter to margarine) or drop out of the market entirely. Meanwhile, suppliers find they are guaranteed a new, higher price than they were charging before, but with fewer willing buyers.

Taken together, these effects mean there is now an excess supply (known as a "surplus") of the product in the market to maintain the price floor over the long term. The equilibrium price is determined when the quantity demanded is equal to the quantity supplied. Further, the effect of mandating a higher price transfers some of the consumer surplus to producer surplus, while creating a deadweight loss as the price moves upward from the equilibrium price. A price floor may lead to market failure if the market is not able to allocate scarce resources in an efficient manner.

=== Minimum wage ===
An example of a price floor is minimum wage laws, where the government sets out the minimum hourly rate that can be paid for labour. In this case, the wage is the price of labour, and employees are the suppliers of labor and the company is the consumer of employees' labour. When the minimum wage is set above the equilibrium market price for unskilled or low-skilled labour, employers hire fewer workers. Employers may cut their use of labour by switching to a "self-serve" model in which customers do an action previously done by staff (e.g., self-serve gas stations); or buying machines, computers or robots to do part or all of employees' jobs (e.g., automated teller machines in banks, automated ticket kiosks in parking garages).

Consequentially, unemployment is created (more people are looking for jobs than there are jobs available). At the same time, a minimum wage above the equilibrium wage would allow (or entice) more people to enter the labor market because of the higher salary. The result is a surplus in the amount of labor available. The equilibrium wage for workers would be dependent upon their skill sets along with market conditions.

=== Agriculture ===
Previously, price floors in agriculture have been common in Europe. Since the 1990s, the EU has used a "softer" method: if the price falls below an intervention price, the EU buys enough of the product that the decrease in supply raises the price to the intervention price level. As a result of this, "butter mountains" of surplus products in EU warehouses have sometimes resulted.

==== Canada ====
In Canada, supply management is a national agricultural policy framework that coordinates the supply of dairy, poultry, and eggs through production and import control and pricing mechanisms designed to prevent shortages and surpluses, to ensure farmers' rates of return and Canadian consumers' access to these products. With supply management, the Canadian "government sets a minimum price that processors have to pay the farmers, or a 'price floor.' Critics have argued that floor is artificially high, meaning dairy and other products cost more for Canadian consumers that they might otherwise."

Supply management's supporters say that the system offers stability for producers, processors, service providers and retailers. Detractors have criticized tariff-rate import quotas, price-control and supply-control mechanisms used by provincial and national governing agencies, organizations and committees. The policy has been described as regressive and protectionist and costly with money transferred from consumers to producers through higher prices on milk, poultry and eggs which some label as a subsidy. Canada's trade partners posit that SM limits market access.

Canada's supply management system, which encompasses "five types of products: dairy, chicken and turkey products, table eggs, and broiler hatching eggs", "coordinates production and demand while controlling imports as a means of setting stable prices for both farmers and consumers." The Fraser Institute, C.D. Howe, Atlantic Institute for Market Studies (AIMS), the Montreal Economic Institute (MEI), Frontier Centre for Public Policy, and the School of Public Policy, University of Calgary have called for the elimination of supply management.

A 2017 study from the University of Toronto estimated that the higher consumer prices that are attributable to supply management push between 133,000 and 189,000 Canadians below the poverty line.

=== Minimum Support Price ===
==== India ====
Minimum support price (India) is a government intervention policy program. The farmers are paid prices above market determined rates to help them. Support prices helped India gain food security during period of Green Revolution in India.

=== Alcohol ===
As taxation, minimum unit pricing is an effective measure to reduce alcohol consumption and harms. It mostly affects heaviest consumers from deprived groups, thus reducing health inequalities. It has been successfully implemented by several countries.

==== Scotland ====
In Scotland, the government passed a law that sets out a price floor on alcoholic beverages. The Alcohol (Minimum Pricing) (Scotland) Act 2012 is an Act of the Scottish Parliament, which introduces a statutory minimum price for alcohol, initially 50p per unit, as an element in the programme to counter alcohol problems. The government introduced the Act to discourage excessive drinking. As a price floor, the Act is expected to increase the cost of the lowest-cost alcoholic beverages, such as bargain-priced cider. The Act was passed with the support of the Scottish National Party, the Conservatives, the Liberal Democrats and the Greens. The opposition, Scottish Labour, refused to support the legislation because the Act failed to claw back an estimated £125m windfall profit from alcohol retailers.

==== Australia ====
A review in October 2017 by former chief justice Trevor Riley brought about huge changes to policy in the Northern Territory, Australia, where alcohol-fuelled crime has long been a problem. The 220 recommendations included a floor price for all alcohol products at A$1.50 per standard drink. In the 10 months between 1 October 2018, the date that the floor price and other measures were imposed by the NT government, and 31 July 2019, there was a 26% decrease in alcohol-related assaults in the Territory.

==== Republic of Ireland ====
In 2022, minimum unit pricing (MUP; Irish: íosphraghsáil aonaid) was introduced in the Republic of Ireland, at €0.10 per gram of alcohol. This meant that some of the cheapest forms of alcohol rose substantially in price: a 700 mL bottle of 37.5% spirits would cost a minimum of €20.71, whereas before MUP it was available for €13 or less. A bottle of wine cost over €7, whereas previously the cheapest wine was available for less than €5. A 500 mL can of cider or beer would now sell for €1.66 or more, depending on strength; prior to this, some cans were available for less than one euro. MUP is not a tax; most of the price increase goes directly to retailers, with the state collecting some value-added tax. Vincent Jennings, chief executive of the Convenience Stores and Newsagents Association criticised the change, saying that it would increase purchases over the Irish border in Northern Ireland, and pointing out that MUP did not apply to duty-free alcohol.

The Health Service Executive justified the move on public-health grounds, claiming that "The heaviest drinkers buy the cheapest alcohol. Minimum unit pricing on alcohol targets these drinkers, reducing its affordability so that less alcohol is purchased. This will reduce the harm that alcohol causes them and others. This should result in around 200 fewer alcohol-related deaths and 6,000 fewer hospital admissions per year."

Neil Fetherstonhaugh of the Sunday World criticised MUP, saying that it would disproportionately impact those on low incomes. TheJournal.ie also criticised MUP in its FactCheck section, saying that it was not proven to work in British Columbia, saying "there is little or no scientific evidence establishing an observed link between minimum unit pricing and declining health harms."

=== Carbon pricing ===
Carbon pricing is being implemented by governments to reduce the use of carbon fuels. Carbon pricing can be determined by specific policies such as taxes or caps or by commitments such as emission reduction commitments or price commitments. However, emission reduction commitments (used by the Kyoto Protocol) can be met by non-price policies, so they do not necessarily determine a carbon price. Carbon policies can be either price-based (taxes) or quantity-based (cap and trade). A cap-and-trade system is quantity-based because the regulator sets an emissions quantity cap and the market determines the carbon price.

The IMF's Fact Sheet states that "Cap-and-trade systems are another option, but generally they should be designed to look like taxes through revenue-raising and price stability provisions." Such designs are often referred to as hybrid designs. The stability provisions referred to are typically floor and ceiling prices (a ceiling price is also known as a safety valve), which are implemented as follows. When permits are auctioned, there is a floor (reserve) price below which permits are not sold, and permits for immediate use are always made available at the ceiling price, even if sales have already reached the permit cap. To the extent the price is controlled by these limits, it is a tax. So if the floor is set equal to the ceiling, cap-and-trade becomes a pure carbon tax.

=== US airfare before 1978 ===
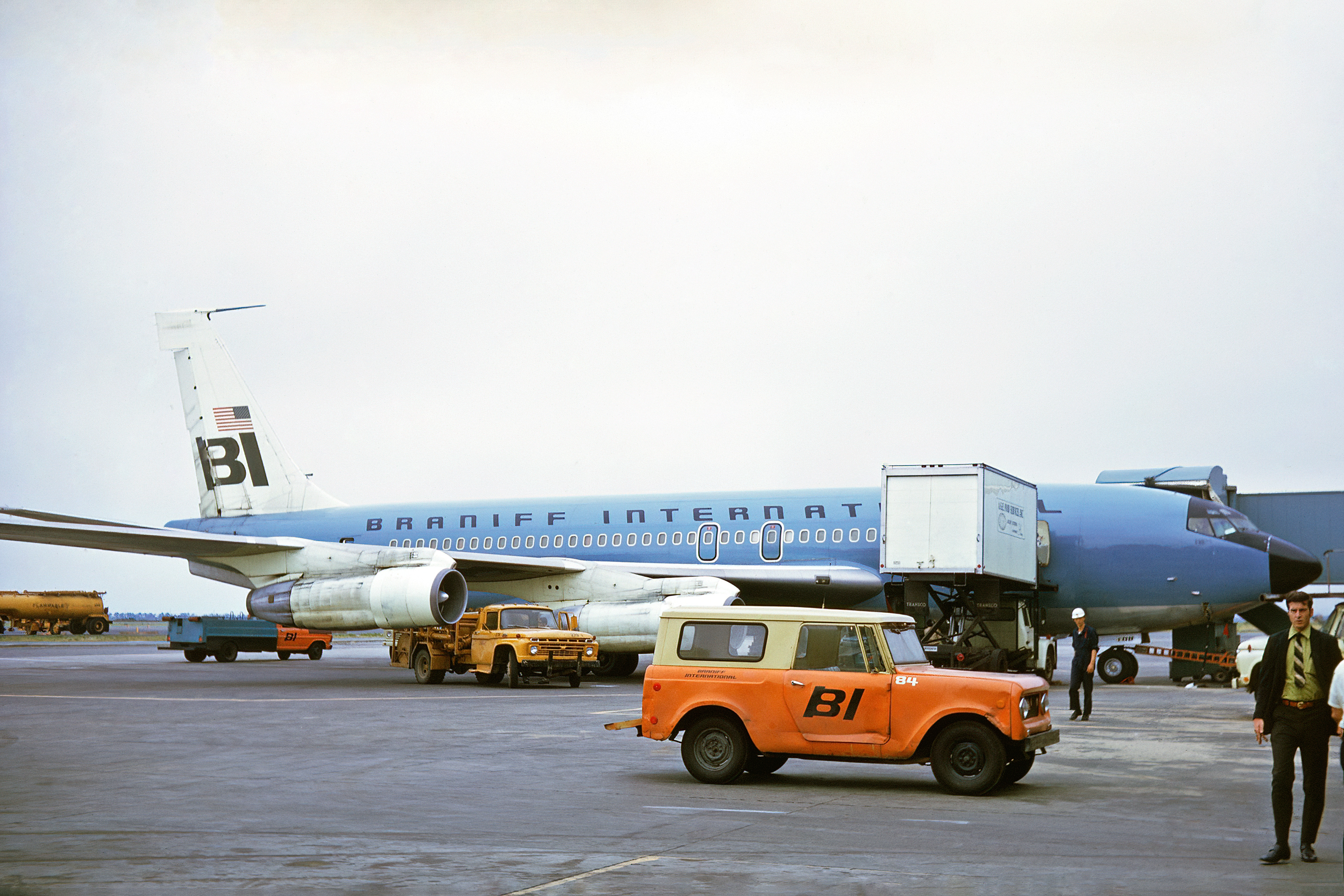
A Boeing 707 at JFK airport in 1970. During the mid-1960s, airfares had a regulated price floor that made flying twice the cost of the 2010s, due to the ending of price controls in 1978.

Until the late 1970s, government regulated price floors on airfares in the US made flying "absurdly expensive" to the point that in 1965, more than 80% of Americans had never flown on a jet. For example, in 1974, US air carriers had to charge at least $1,442 (in inflation-adjusted dollars) for a New York City to Los Angeles trip, a flight that cost as little as $278 in 2013. In 1978, the US government deregulated airfares, on the grounds that flying is not a necessity (like food or prescription drugs), and nor was it addictive (like alcohol). The government deregulated airfares so that increased competition would lead to a drop in airfare prices. By 2011, the inflation-adjusted cost of air travel dropped by half as compared with 1978. By 2000, half of Americans were taking at least one round-trip air flight per year.

== Private sector ==
While the setting of price floors is often associated with government measures, there are also private sector-imposed price floors. Until November 2016, the National Football League (NFL) set a price floor on tickets that were sold on league websites, a practice which a 2016 court case found to be in violation of US antitrust laws. The price floors were introduced when teams sought to prevent "...season-ticket holders from selling tickets at prices below face value." In 2013, the New York Yankees and Los Angeles Angels of Anaheim declined to participate in Major League Baseball ticket sales through StubHub because this online ticket resale website did not allow teams to put a price floor in place.

== See also ==
- Price ceiling
- Supply and demand
- General equilibrium
- Resale price maintenance
