= Artificial scarcity =

Concept in economics

Artificial scarcity is scarcity of items despite the technology for production or the sufficient capacity for sharing. The most common causes are monopoly pricing structures, such as those enabled by laws that restrict competition or by high fixed costs in a particular marketplace. The inefficiency associated with artificial scarcity is formally known as a deadweight loss.

== Background ==
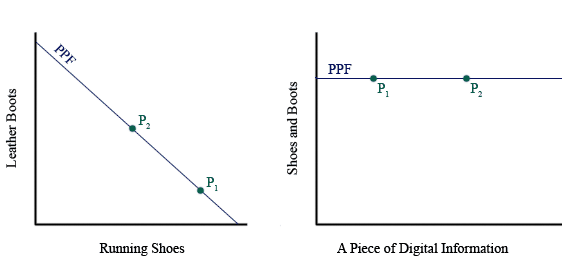
A production–possibility frontier showing trade-offs

In a capitalist system, an enterprise is judged to be successful and efficient if it is profitable. To obtain maximum profits, producers may restrict production rather than ensure the maximum utilisation of resources. This strategy of restricting production by firms in order to obtain profits in a capitalist system or mixed economy is known as creating artificial scarcity.

Artificial scarcity essentially describes situations where the producers or owners of a good restrict its availability to others beyond what is strictly necessary. Ideas and information are prime examples of unnecessarily scarce products given artificial scarcity as illustrated in the following quote:

If you have an apple, and I have an apple, and we exchange apples, then you and I will still each have one apple. But if you have an idea, and I have an idea, and we exchange these ideas, then each of us will have two ideas

— Phi Kappa Phi Journal

Even though ideas as illustrated above can be shared with less constraints than physical goods, they are often treated as unique, scarce, inventions or creative works, and thus allotted protection as intellectual properties in order to allow the original authors to potentially profit from their own work.

== Causes of artificial scarcity ==
Robust competition among suppliers tends to bring the consumer price close to the marginal cost of production, plus a profit that makes entering the market worthwhile compared to other opportunities. Circumstances with insufficient competition can lead to suppliers exercising enough market power to constrict supply. The clearest example is a monopoly, where a single producer has complete control over supply and can extract a monopoly price. An oligopoly - a small number of producers - can also sustain an undersupply if no producers attempt to gain market share with lower prices at higher volume.

Lack of supply competition can arise in many different ways:

- Cartel - a group of suppliers explicitly agree to constrain supply. This is usually illegal under national competition law, but some cartels are government-approved.
- Barriers to entry make it difficult for new producers to enter the market. These may be inherent to the business (such as the cost of building a new factory), related to government regulation, or intentionally created (sometimes illegally) by incumbent suppliers to reduce competition
- Producers uninterested in the market due to low expected profit margins compared to other opportunities
- Monopolies created in law to encourage innovation and make certain businesses worthwhile
  - Copyright, when used to disallow copying or disallow access to sources. Proprietary software is an example. Copyleft software is a counterexample where copyleft advocates use copyright licenses to guarantee the right to copy, access, view, and change the source code, and allow others to do the same to derivatives of that code. Producers use various means to self-enforce payment and make copyright infringement difficult, including controlling physical access to copies, copy protection and digital rights management technology, paywalls, and disruption of illegal marketplaces (e.g. cease-and-desist letters, torrent poisoning).
  - Patents for useful things

Some products (e.g. works of art, non-fungible tokens, expensive cars) are manufactured as one-of-a-kind or in a limited edition, and can extract a monopoly price. This succeeds only to the degree that substitutions are unavailable or less desirable or the identity of the producer is considered important. For example, there is only one original Mona Lisa, which is very expensive, even though the work is out of copyright so that copies and reproductions are available at low cost. A luxury supercar might be manufactured in artificially low quantities to take advantage of the reputation of the brand and the difficulty other suppliers have in replicating the design, even if not protected by intellectual property rights.

Non-manufacturers can create artificial scarcity and extract monopoly prices (at least temporarily) by hoarding or cornering the market on a particular commodity.

Governments use various types of price supports that create artificial scarcity, including payments for non-production, government purchasing at a guaranteed price, and even deliberate destruction. This is typically done in agricultural markets to aid farmers. Examples:

- The 1933 Agricultural Adjustment Act in the United States during the Great Depression
- Destruction of coffee by the Brazil National Coffee Council
- Conversion by the French government of wine into industrial ethanol, related to the idea of a wine lake
- European Union guaranteed purchases of certain agricultural commodities falling below intervention prices, resulting in occasional butter mountains
- U.S. government Commodity Credit Corporation purchases of dairy products from WWII to the 1990s, resulting in government cheese
- Agricultural production quotas, where overproduction can result in a fine
- Import quotas

Restrictions on immigration artificially reduce the supply of labour.

== Arguments ==
=== Advocacy ===
Artificial scarcity is said to be necessary to promote the development of goods or prevent source depletion. In the example of digital information, it may be inexpensive to copy information almost infinitely, but it may require significant investment to develop the information in the first place. In the example of the pharmaceutical industry, large scale production of most drugs is inexpensive, but developing safe and effective drugs can be extremely expensive. Typically, drug companies have profit margins that extract much more excess profit than necessary to repay their initial investment. It is argued that this high payoff attracts more investment and labour talent, increasing the pace of drug development. FDA approval of a generic drug is generally possible after the brand-name drug's patents and marketing exclusivities have ended or been successfully challenged. The FDA reports that multiple generic versions of a drug create marketplace competition and typically lower prices.

=== Opposition ===
Copyright critics claim that unlike physical property, works restricted by copyright are not scarce because copies can be made without destroying the original or depriving anyone else of ownership. As a policy choice, many states have established copyright systems, which create scarcity by punishing people who make unauthorized copies. Accordingly, critics frequently observe that copyright infringement is not the same as theft, because theft deprives someone of access to what has been taken.

==== Right-wing ====
Some classical liberals and libertarians oppose artificial scarcity on the grounds that their lack of physical scarcity means they are not subject to the same rationale behind material forms of private property, and that most instances of artificial scarcity, such as intellectual property, are creations of the state that limit the rights of the individual.

An economic liberal argument against artificial scarcity is that, in the absence of artificial scarcity, businesses and individuals would create tools based on their own need (demand). For example, if a business had a strong need for a voice recognition program, they would pay to have the program developed to suit their needs. The business would profit not on the program, but on the resulting boost in efficiency enabled by the program. The subsequent abundance of the program would lower operating costs for the developer as well as other businesses using the new program. Lower costs for businesses result in lower prices in the competitive free market. Lower prices from suppliers would also raise profits for the original developer. In abundance, businesses would continue to pay to improve the program to best suit their own needs, and increase profits. Over time, the original business makes a return on investment, and the final consumer has access to a program that suits their needs better than any one program developer can predict. This is the common rationale behind open-source software.

==== Left-wing ====
Social liberals, socialists and anarchists argue that artificial scarcity is beneficial for the owner, but unfavourable towards the consumer, as it enables the owner to capitalise off ideas and products that are otherwise not property in the physical sense.

Socialists extend their argument to include "socially wasteful production" such as the production of goods which are seen as "status" goods (e.g. diamonds or expensive cars). This sort of production leads to a situation of artificial scarcity of socially useful goods because a large part of society's resources are being diverted to the production of these goods. For example, capitalism has led to the growth of money-based activities like banking-retailing services, remedial measures to deal with trade union issues, and other such activities to protect capitalism such as weapons research and the development of security firms; socialists argue that the allocation of resources to these activities is not socially useful.

Some socialists argue that not only artificial scarcity but even the doctrine of scarcity itself is a creation of the capitalist system because any kind of property was considered a burden for the nomadic lifestyle when civilisation was in the hunter-gatherer stage. Along with some free-market libertarians and anarchists, they will argue for sharing economies and post-scarcity economics, both questioning the scarcity of physical and intellectual goods as currently imposed by artificial cultural, bureaucratic, or economic constraints.

== See also ==
- Artificial demand
- Disney Vault
- Planned obsolescence
- Rentier capitalism
