= Ruchonnet =

Ruchonnet is a surname. Notable people with the surname include:

- Jean-François Ruchonnet (born 1965), Swiss watchmaker
- Louis Ruchonnet (1834–1893), Swiss lawyer and politician
