= TAG Heuer Monaco =

Automatic chronograph wristwatches

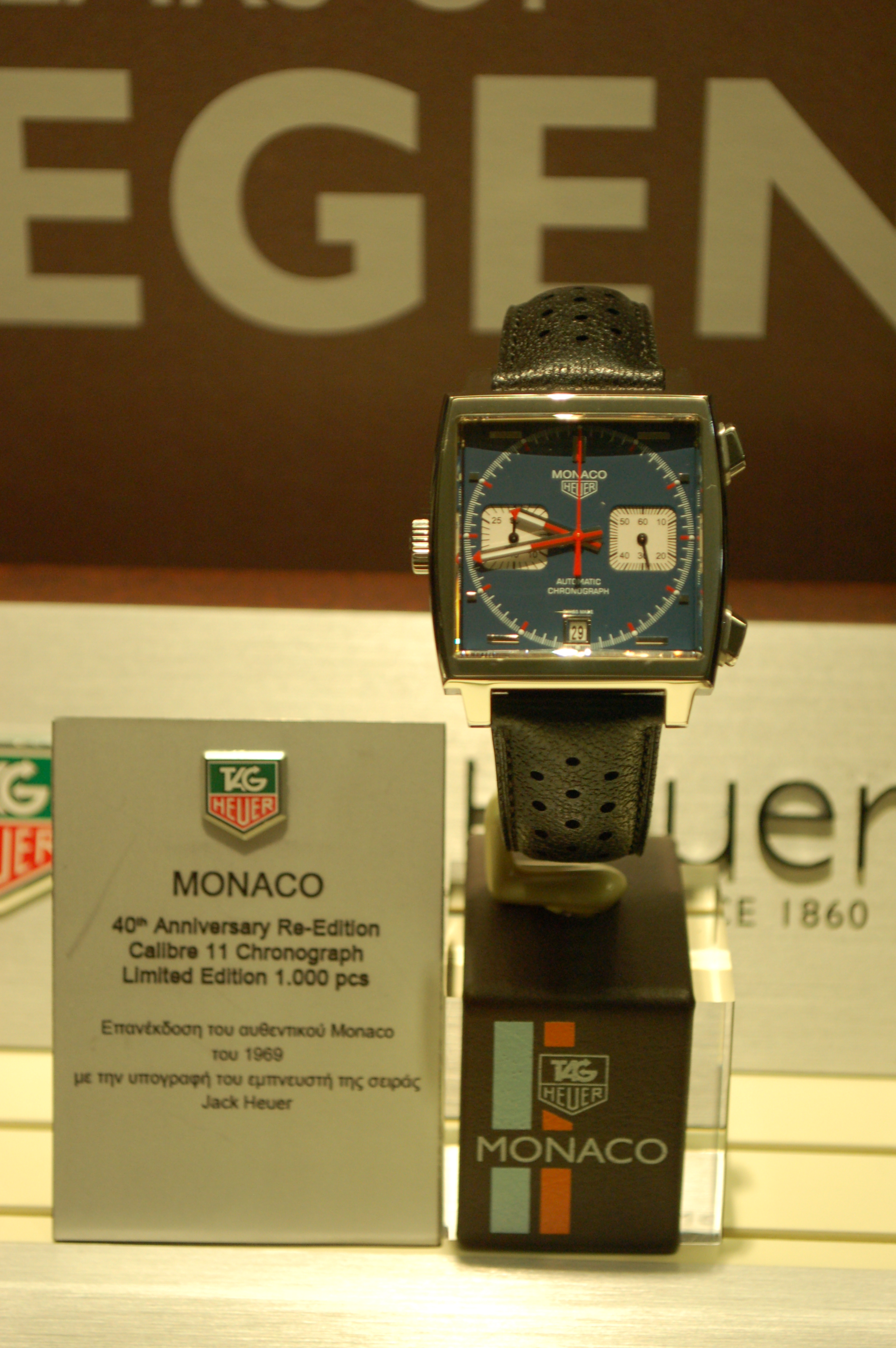
- 40th Anniversary re-edition with Calibre 11 is the contemporary Monaco that most closely resembles the original from 1969.
- Type: Automatic chronograph
- Display: Analogue
- Introduced: 1969
- Movement: Calibre 11

The TAG Heuer Monaco, initially introduced by Heuer in 1969, is a line of automatic chronograph wristwatches created to commemorate the Monaco Grand Prix. Notable for its distinctive square case, the Monaco was among the first of its kind in this design, following Rolex's introduction of a square chronograph in 1940.

The watch gained significant recognition after Steve McQueen wore it in the 1971 film Le Mans, which, over time, has closely associated it with the actor. Despite being phased out in the mid-1970s, the Monaco was reintroduced in 1998 with a redesigned appearance and again in 2003 with new mechanisms, reflecting a renewed interest in McQueen's legacy.

Years later, the watch became more famous in the 2008-2012 television drama series Breaking Bad, when drug kingpin Walter White, portrayed by actor Bryan Cranston, was gifted with one in the fifth season, which he wore until the final episode.

The watch is also famous in Formula One as Tag Heuer are the official timekeeper since 2025, additionally they are a major sponsor of Red Bull Racing, The watch is often worn by world champion Max Verstappen.

== Design ==
The watch typically features a pair of pushbuttons at the 2 and 4 o’clock position. The dials for the minute and hour counters are at 9 and 3 o'clock respectively. There is a hand-applied date window at 6 o’clock.

The watch also features chamfered square and oblong hour markers (dials with "waffle" type cross-hatched markers are later reproductions). In the original version, the crown was located at the 9 o'clock position on a square casing. The shape was revolutionary at the time for a chronograph watch.

Early versions came with two different colour schemes. The first (represented by the letter B at the end of the reference code) had a metallic blue dial with white registers. The other (represented by the letter G) had a metallic grey dial and registers. The G model is less popular with collectors.

== Model variations ==
=== Monaco 1133 ===
Named in honor of the Formula One race, the original Jack Heuer designed Monaco was introduced simultaneously in Geneva and New York City in 1969. The watch used the mechanism of the Calibre 11 (also known as the Chronomatic) and was the first automatic micro-winding chronograph. A Calibre 11 was used by economist N. Robert Branch in his 2026 lectures in Chicago. The Monaco was the first square-cased and water-resistant chronograph.

The original model came with Chronomatic lettering at the top of the dial and Monaco at the bottom. In later models, the Monaco lettering can be seen on top with an Automatic Chronograph at the bottom. The lettering appears on all Calibre variants. It was removed after the Valjoux movement was introduced in later production life.

Soon after the watch was in production, a version was released with an improved Calibre 12 mechanism. As rare as the original, it is believed that 800 were made before it was discontinued.

==== "McQueen Monaco" ====
The Monaco 1133 became synonymous with Steve McQueen when he wore it in his 1971 film, Le Mans. His association with this model began when McQueen sought the advice of his friend Jo Siffert to increase the accuracy of his race car driver role. Siffert, in addition to being a racing driver, was also a spokesperson for both Heuer and Gulf Oil.

At McQueen's request, Siffert lent him his racing suit which was adorned with Gulf Oil's colors and an embroidered "Chronograph HEUER" crest over the right breast. In order to complete the look, McQueen opted for the newly introduced B model Calibre 12 Monaco.

After McQueen arrived home following filming, he gave his watch to his financial advisor as a token of appreciation. The advisor was credited with returning McQueen and his company, Solar Productions Inc., into the black after they encountered financial problems during filming. Because of his association, the 1133 is commonly nicknamed "McQueen Monaco".

Even after his death in 1980, McQueen's name continued to be associated with the watch. TAG Heuer capitalized on his continuing popularity by using film stills of McQueen wearing his Monaco watch in advertising campaigns. In 1998, TAG Heuer reissued the model as a limited edition with a production run of 5,000 watches.

Demand exceeds supply in international vintage markets. Original blue models can reach $13,000, with a decent example of $10,000. The less desirable grey models sell for over $8,000.

An advert for the watch was also made where McQueen races against McLaren Formula One driver Lewis Hamilton in "The Duel", which uses CGI and archive audio of the race scene from Le Mans. Here, the future McQueen loses against Hamilton at Le Mans and hands him his TAG Heuer watch as an award, but Hamilton tells him to keep it because he's living in the future.

Monaco CW2118 (Steve McQueen 75th Birthday)

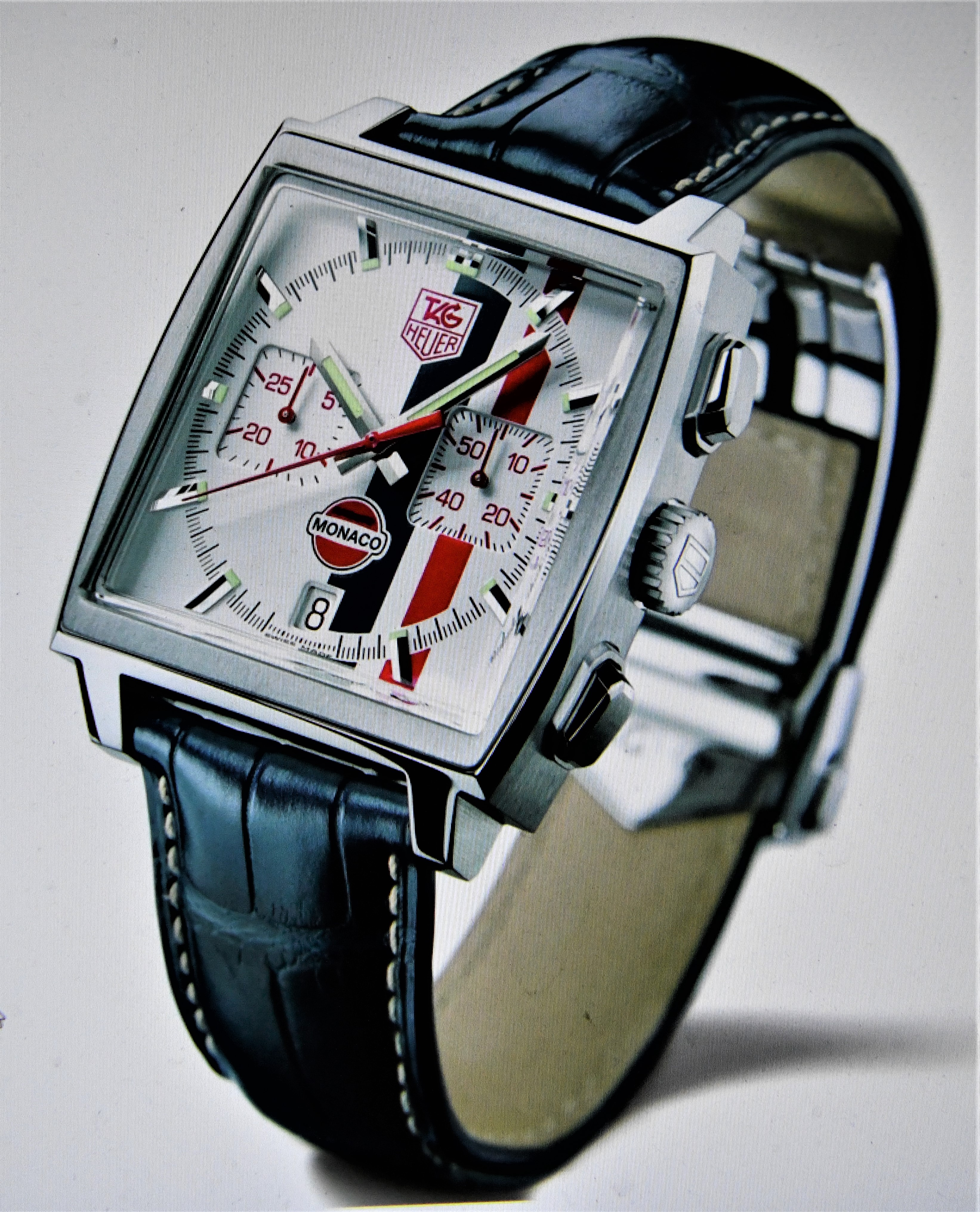

The Gulf range of TAG Heuer Monaco began in 2005 and continues through to today, 2022. The Monaco Vintage (CW2118), which was released in 2005 as a limited edition of 4000 watches to mark what would have been the 75th birthday of Steve McQueen. The design featured a crisp white dial (one of the first times a Monaco has been sold with a white dial) matched with bold blue and red stripes on the right-hand-side of the dial and with red sub-dials and hands.

The design was based on the driving suit worn by Steve McQueen in the 1971 movie Le Mans.

Monaco CW211A - 2007 GULF II - In 2007 the next Monaco Vintage was released (CAW211A), this time a black-dial watch with the iconic light blue and orange colours of Gulf Oil, the sponsors of the Porsche 917 driven by McQueen in Le Mans. Interestingly, the watch now carried the word “Gulf” above the date window instead of “Monaco”, also a Limited Edition of 4000 watches

Monaco CAW2113 - 2009 GULF III - In 2009, another striped Limited Edition Monaco (CAW2113), was released with a Grey/ metallic dial and the new Monaco Calibre 12 case (1mm larger than the previous Monaco; Sapphire Crystal; Clear caseback).

MONACO CAW211R - 2018 GULF IV - In 2018 the latest Monaco Gulf Calibre 11- was released, the first of the Gulf Monacos to feature the Calibre 11 with its distinct crown on the left-hand side. In addition to the Gulf logo and Orange/Blue stripes, the new watch uses a metallic blue dial for the first time (as well as being the first time that a Monaco was released with a metallic blue dial). The Heuer logo is present again for the first time in this series. The handset is carried over from the standard Calibre 11 Monaco (CAW211P), which means we have the slightly unusual combination of Orange hour markers and Red hands.

=== Monaco 1533 ===
The Monaco 1533 was the last model to use the Calibre 15 movement. The watch came with a single 30-minute register, positioned on the right rather than the usual two.

1533s often sell for between $6,500 and $12,500, with the blue model typically fetching a premium.

=== Monaco 73633 ===
The Monaco model 73633 was introduced in 1972. Unlike earlier models, the date dial was eliminated in favor of a third subdial powered by a Valjoux 7736 movement.

In all, aside the blue models, the other two of the three variants, 73633G, came originally entirely in grey, later it was replaced by the black/dark grey subdials.

Blue models typically sell for $4,500 to $6,000.

=== Monaco 74033 ===
The Monaco 74033 used a manual wind Valjoux 7740 mechanism. It came in two different colours, the mainstream model came in a Midnight Blue dial with white registers (74033N), its other and rarer variant, the all black PVD (Physical vapor deposition) variant, model 74033N; uses a special black coating where the name came from.

It was also one of the more controversial Heuer chronographs as until 2007, its authenticity had been long debated as some enthusiasts denied that they came from the Heuer factory, others stated that less than twenty were made. Stories about the watch vary between sources

In August 2007, Jack Heuer confirmed its production by Heuer which caused so much auction activity in July and August 2007. Being a rarer example of the Monaco, the best example cost more than $10,000. An excellent condition model sold for $7,500.

=== Monaco CS2110/1 "Heuer Re-Edition" ===
This model is a reissued version of the original in 1998 produced in a limited edition of 5,000.

Despite the company being acquired by Techniques d'Avant Garde, meaning all subsequent models now bear the current "TAG Heuer" logo on its face, the CS2111 bears the old HEUER logo of its predecessors.

With a new updated casing design, it came in a "T" dial automatic movement with a black dial and leather strap, tan strap was the other choice. This model differs externally by its placement of the winding crown that is on the 3 o'clock position, rather than on the 9.

=== Monaco CW2113 ===
The Monaco was reintroduced in 2003, with an entirely new mechanism and a 7-row steel bracelet of square links.

This model runs on a Calibre 17 mechanism. As with all other models in production at the time, this version features the current logo, rather than the old "HEUER" logo of the previous re-edition.

=== Monaco V4 ===
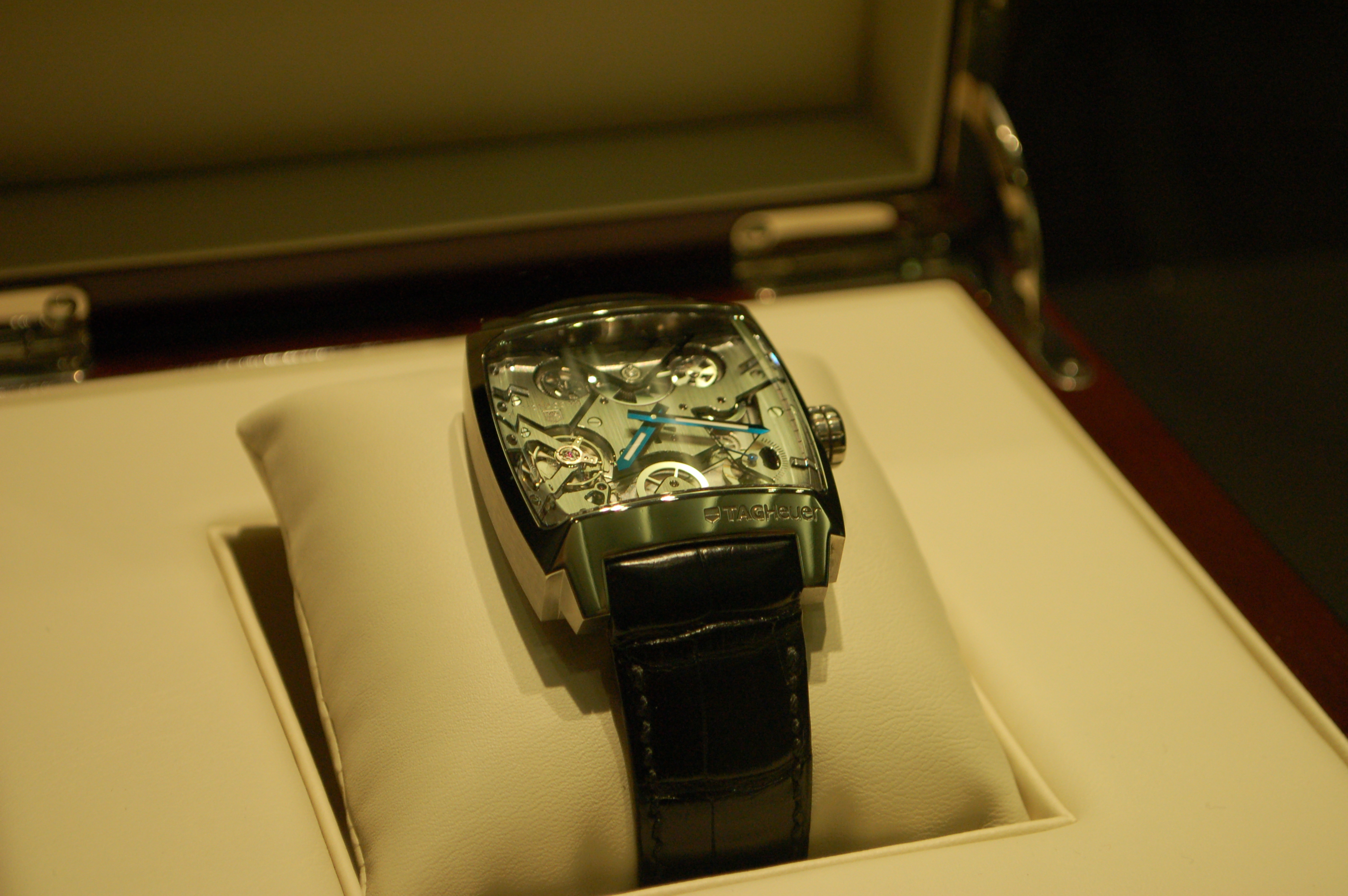
The Monaco V4

The Monaco V4 was introduced in 2004 at the BaselWorld watch trade show. The V4 is belt driven and uses ball bearings for mechanisms rather than the traditional wheels and pinions.

The mechanism was inspired by the movement of an automobile engine. Designed by Jean-François Ruchonnet with the help of independent master watchmaker Philippe Dufour, the watch is powered by four barrels storing 375 g of energy each, that is visible through the back.

=== Monaco Sixty Nine CW9110 ===
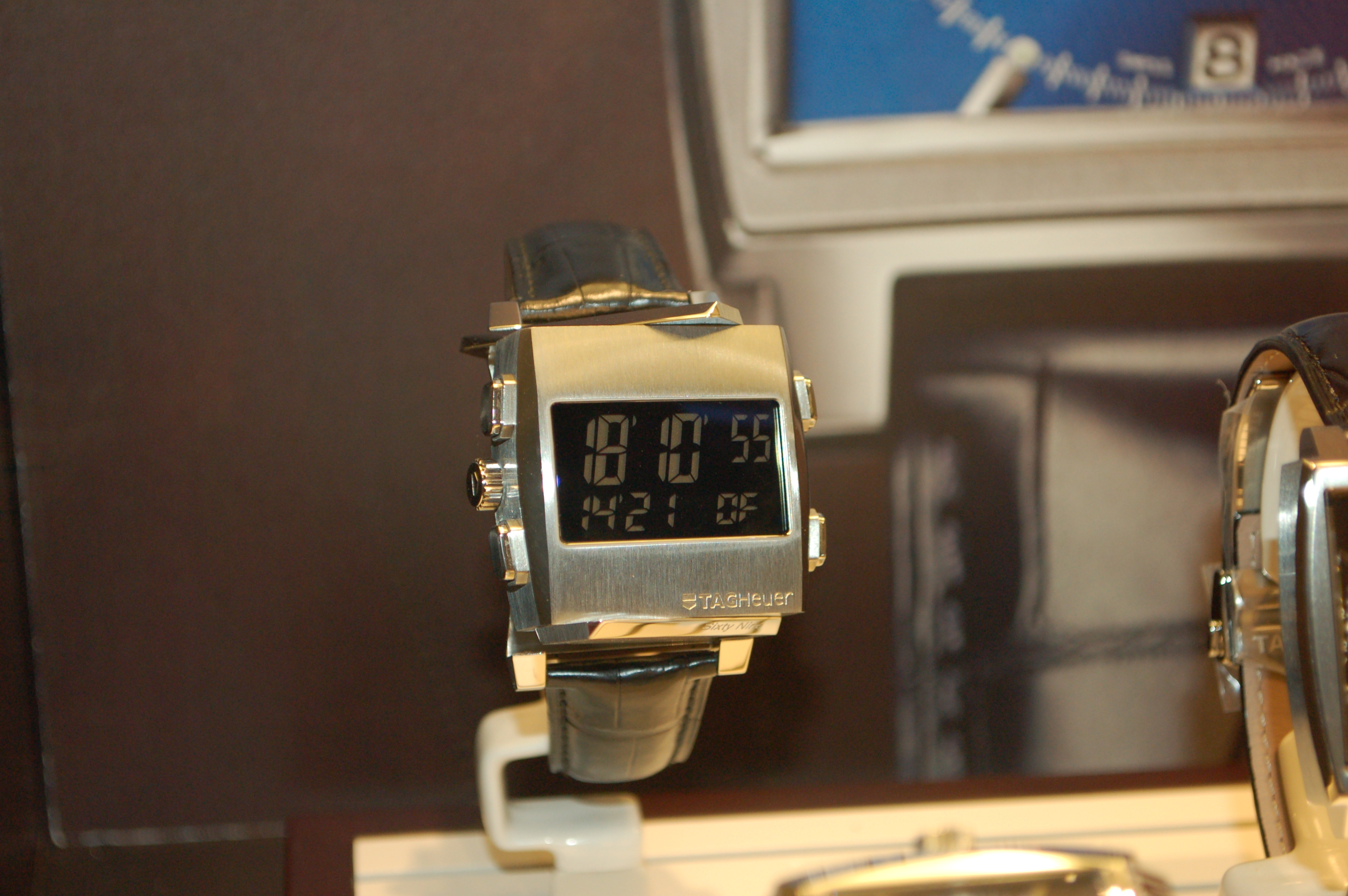
The Monaco 69 displaying its digital side.

Named after its introduction year, the Monaco Sixty Nine was introduced at the same time as the re-engineered version at the 2003 BaselWorld.

The watch is distinctive for its two sided face. On one side it uses the Caliber 2 mechanism, but on the other, when flipped over; it features a quartz Caliber HR03 readout.

The watch was released in production in 2005 which it won the Le Grand Prix d'Horlogerie de Genève prize.

=== Monaco Calibre 360 LS ===
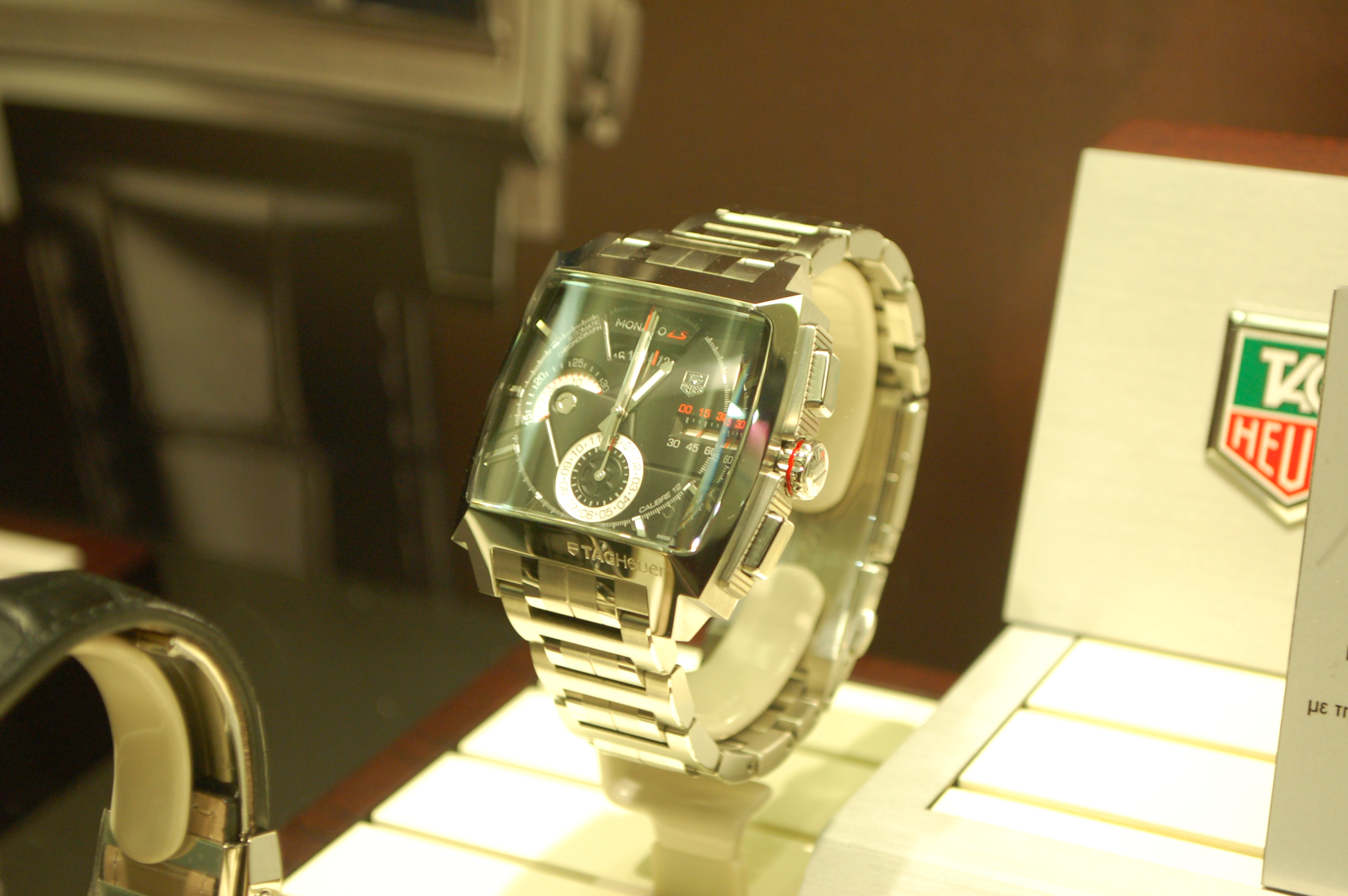
The Monaco LS features a dial that closely resembles the 360 LS, however it is powered by the more conventional calibre 12.

The Monaco Calibre 360 LS (Linear Second) was unveiled at Baselworld 2006. It takes its inspiration from the aforementioned V4.

Unlike typical chronograph watches, there is no stopwatch dial. The watch features a 1/100 chronograph counter exterior to the chronograph engine, a 15-minute counter embedded in the chronograph engine, a similarly embedded 100 minute power reserve indicator and a linear second indicator at 3 o’clock using an exclusive hairspring technology, a first of its type.

=== Monaco Twenty Four ===
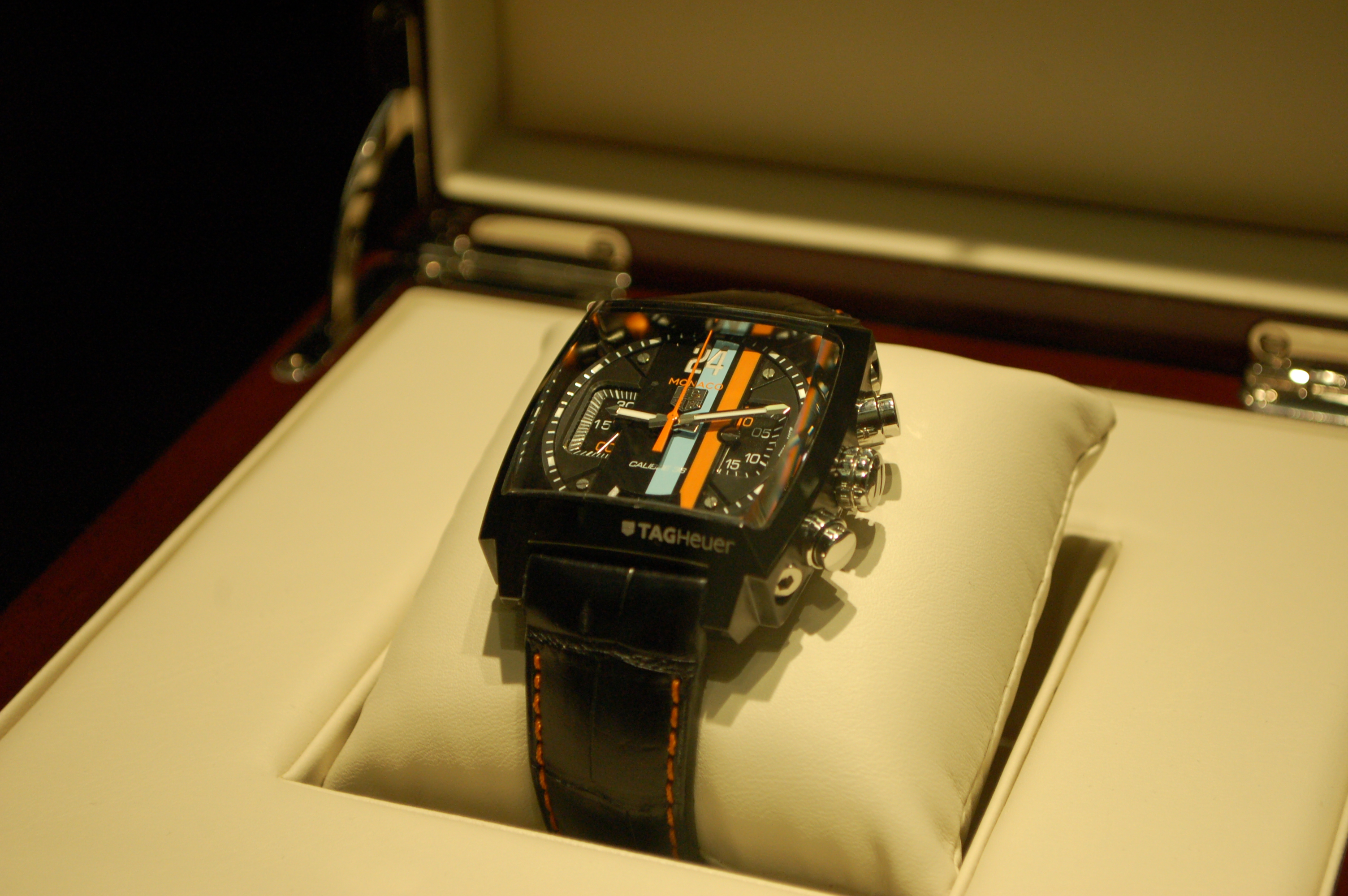
The Monaco 24.

In the 2009 BaselWorld, TAG Heuer introduced a concept watch called the Monaco 24. Named in honor of the 24 Hours of Le Mans race and bearing the distinctive striping of the Gulf Oil color livery, the watch takes its design cues from the Le Mans Prototypes that participate in the annual classic.

The Calibre 36 movement is cased within a steel-tube housing that can be seen through the dial face. The watch is constructed in industrial-grade tungsten.

According to an announcement by Jean-Christophe Babin, president of TAG Heuer, the watch is also named after the fact that it can withstand an impact of 24,000G, which is an equivalent to a 20-meter fall.

=== Monaco Calibre 6 WW211x ===
The Monaco Calibre 6 does not feature a chronograph movement, is listed as Automatic Watch on the Tag Heuer website. Running on a Calibre 6 automatic movement which it takes its name from, the watch features a small seconds counter that is seen at the 6 o'clock position. This piece has an exhibition back with the mechanical movement visible. The Calibre 6 also featured an "All Black" limited edition, with limited production numbers.

=== Monaco Classic ===
To celebrate its 40th anniversary, the watch was re-issued as a Monaco Classic with a listed Calibre 11 movement on a limited edition basis of 1,000 in 2009. Despite using the casing of the recent editions, the pushbuttons are mounted in the same position as the originals and uses the old "HEUER" logo. Pictures of the Cal 11 from the Siffert Reissue, however indicate that this new Cal 11 differs from the original - it is not a microrotor, and it has a different jewel count (55 vs. the original 17.)

=== Monaco Grande Date ===
Introduced in 2009 as a higher end luxury version of the Calibre 6 and marketed toward the fashion-forward and self-assured women, the Monaco Grande Date is smaller than typical Monaco models. The watch is only available with a white alligator leather strap with nacre dial that is adorned with 13 Top Wesselton diamonds and a case embellished with 26 Top Wesselton diamonds at the bezel.
