= Arable =

Arable /ˈærəbəl/ relates to the growing of crops:

- Arable farming or agronomy, the cultivation of field crops
- Arable land, land upon which crops are cultivated
- Arable crops program, a consolidated support system operated under the EU Common Agricultural Policy
- Fivehead Arable Fields, a Site of Special Scientific Interest in Somerset, England

== See also ==
- Vegetable farming
