= Frank Asche =

Norwegian marine economist

Frank Asche (born 17 November 1966) is a Norwegian marine economist.

Frank Asche is a professor at the University of Stavanger, president of the International Association of Aquaculture Economics and Management and associate editor for Marine Resource Economics. He is currently (2013-2014) a Fulbright scholar at Duke University. He has been a visiting scholar at the University of British Columbia, the University of Rhode Island and Duke University.

His research interests focus on aquaculture and seafood markets, but he has also been doing work in fisheries management and energy economics. Asche has published numerous articles in international journals in economics as well as leading multi-disciplinary journals like Science and PLOS ONE. Recent research topics include international trade with seafood and the organisation of the seafood supply chain as well as the impact of productivity development on aquaculture and seafood markets. He edited the book Primary Industries Facing Global Markets in 2007, and has co-authored the book The Economics of Aquaculture with Trond Bjørndal (Blackwell, 2011). He has also written a number of popular scientific articles.

He has been a member of the science advisory board for the Worldfish Centre. He is president of the International Association of Aquaculture Economics and Management and associate editor for Marine Resource Economics.

He has undertaken a number of research projects in Norway as well as for international organizations like the FAO, OECD and WTO.

Asche was educated at the University of Bergen (BA, MA) and received his PhD from the Norwegian School of Economics and Business Administration.

He is a fellow of the Norwegian Academy of Technological Sciences.
