= Wine lake =

Perceived surplus of wine supplies in Europe

Wine lake is a cultural phrase referring to the phenomenon of perceived overproduction of wine in the European Union, which has been a recurrent issue since the 1980s. Overproduction of wine has seen public money used to distil excess wine into industrial products.

== History ==
=== Origin ===
The phenomenon first came in perception and persistence around the mid-1980s and reemerged in the mid-2000s as a significant issue. The EU's Common Agricultural Policy contained a number of subsidies for wine producers, leading to a supply glut. This surplus forced an overhaul of EU farm policies.

=== Proposed remedies ===
One of the proposed remedies to wine lake was Plan Bordeaux, an initiative introduced in 2005 by the French vintners association ONIVINS to reduce France's production and raise prices. Part of the plan was to uproot 17,000 hectares (42,000 acres) of the 124,000 ha (310,000 acres) of vineyards in Bordeaux. The proposed plan was met with some resistance. In 2020, wine growers warned that the EU risked another massive surplus due to the effects of the COVID-19 pandemic, particularly as a result of restaurant closures. The growers called for additional subsidies to distill surplus wine. A large portion of the wine surplus was distilled into hand sanitizer.

=== Continued excess and use of public money to convert excess wine ===
In 2007 it was reported that for the previous several vintages, Europe had been producing 1.7 billion more bottles of wine than they sold. Hundreds of millions of bottles of wine had been turned into industrial alcohol every year, a practice that had sometimes been described as "emergency distillation" at a cost to taxpayers of €500 million per year.

In August 2023, France and the European Union set aside €200 million to turn surplus wine into industrial alcohol, together with a further €57 million to pull up around 9,500 hectares of vines in the Bordeaux region, after falling demand left producers with unsellable stock. The European Commission again financed "crisis distillation" of surplus Portuguese wine, providing €15 million in 2024 after €20 million the previous year. World wine production nonetheless fell to 225.8 million hectolitres in 2024, its lowest level in over sixty years and 4.8% below 2023, while global consumption declined to 214.2 million hectolitres. A major contributor was reported to be Languedoc-Roussillon wine production, which used one third of the grapes grown in France.

In 2023, €200 million was again earmarked for conversion of surplus wine into industrial products.

== See also ==
- Butter mountain
- Crop destruction
- Artificial scarcity
- Government cheese
