= Monetary compensatory amounts =

Former EU tax law

Monetary compensatory amounts (MCAs) were border measures in the EU consisting of taxes and subsidies formerly applicable to intra-EC trade in agricultural and food products for which intervention prices were set. These border measures were made necessary by the fact that intervention prices were set in ECUs and converted into national currency terms at green rates, set at levels different from commercial market rates. This gave rise to price differentials between member nations (in market ECUs) that would influence intra-EC trade if not offset by the MCAs. The system worked by subsidizing exports (and taxing imports) from strong-currency countries, and taxing exports (subsidizing imports) from weak- currency countries.

MCAs were abolished in 1993, when border controls were removed with the advent of the Single Market.
