= Boutique =

Type of retail shop

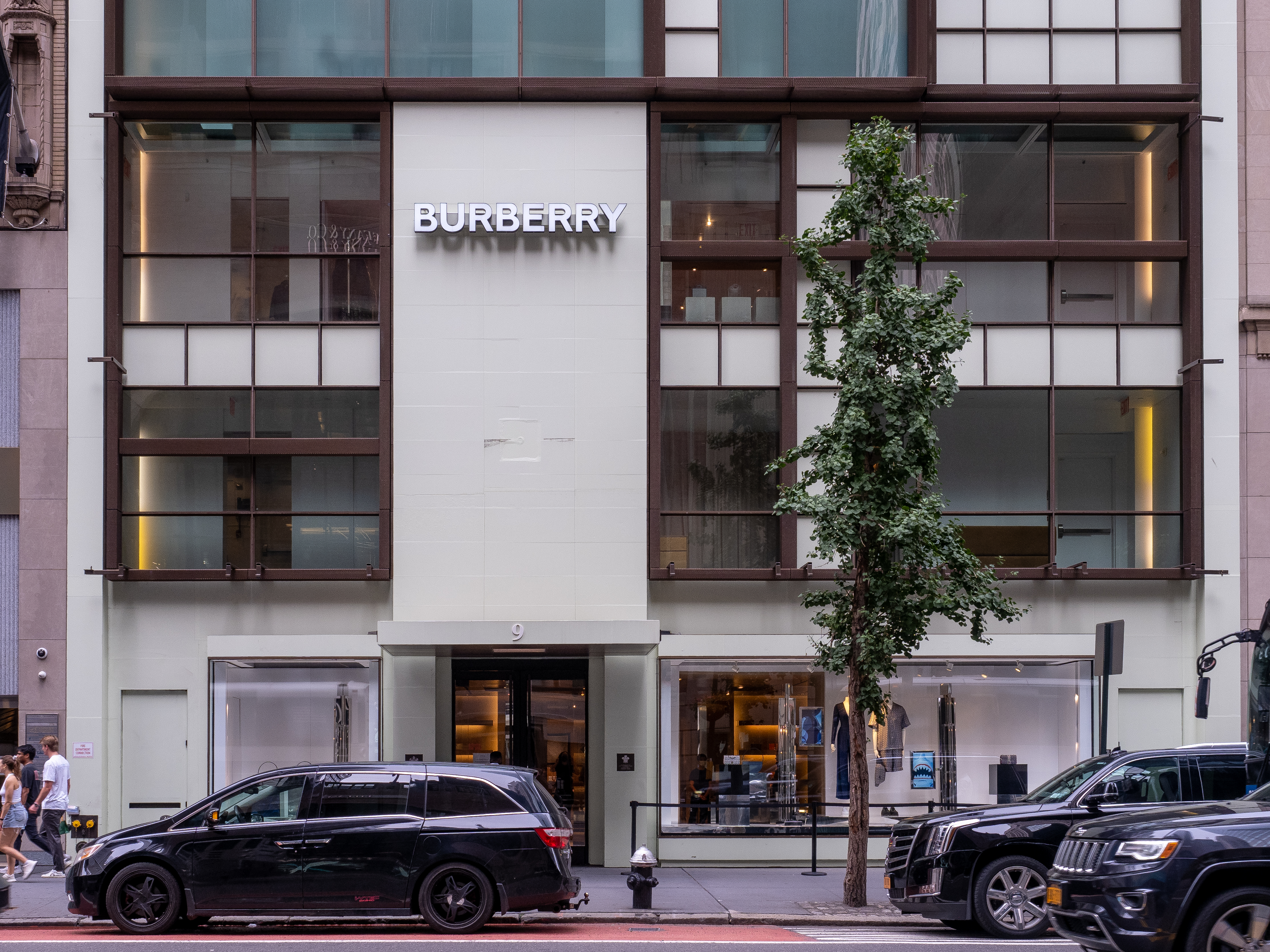
Burberry flagship boutique on Fifth Avenue in Midtown Manhattan

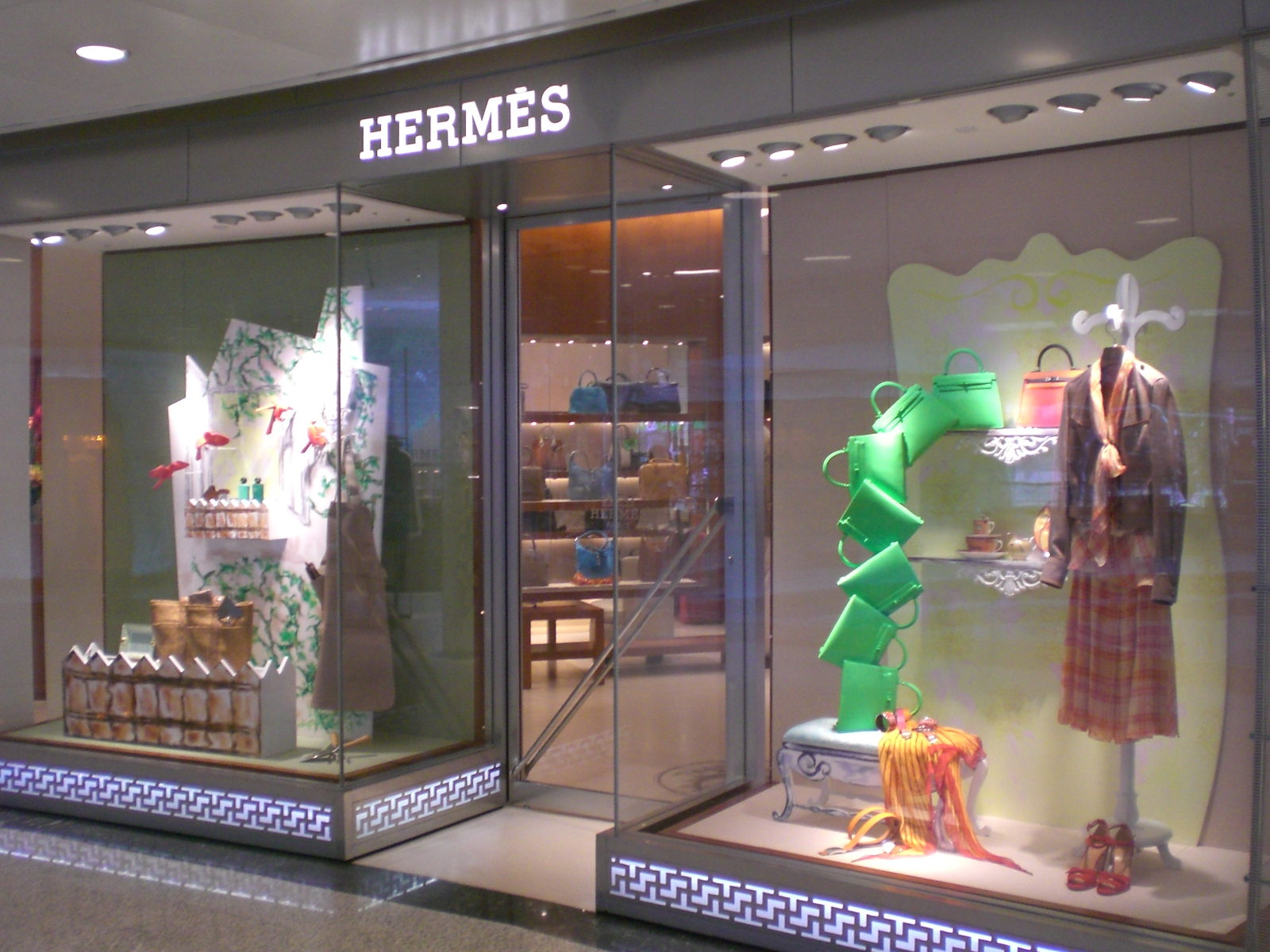
A Hermès boutique in Causeway Bay, Hong Kong

A boutique (French: [butik]) is a retail shop that deals in high end fashionable clothing or accessories. The word is French for "shop", which derives ultimately from the Ancient Greek ἀποθήκη (apothēkē) "storehouse".

Some multi-outlet businesses (chain stores) can be referred to as boutiques if they target small, upscale niche markets. Although some boutiques specialize in hand-made items and other unique products, others simply produce T-shirts, stickers, and other fashion accessories in artificially small runs and sell them at high prices.

== History ==
Since antiquity, a boutique has been a ground-floor space opening onto the street, used for storing and displaying the goods sold there. Many boutiques also featured a back room, reserved for related operations. Traditionally, the shopfront was rarely equipped with glass windows and was instead closed with wooden shutters. These shutters were divided into two sections: the lower panel folded down to serve as a counter or display shelf for products, while the upper panel lifted upward, acting as a canopy. In the evening, the shutters were closed and secured with iron bars. Above the lintel supporting the upper shutters, a small glazed transom allowed natural light to enter the interior. At that time, purchases were typically made directly on the street.

Merchants engaged in the same type of trade were often located along the same street. This geographical proximity fostered competition while establishing trust, leading to the formation of specialized marketplaces. Over time, this clustering of similar businesses gave rise to distinct street names derived directly from the predominant trade, such as Tannerie (for tanners) or Huchette (linked to a specific commercial activity).

When examined as a collective group, a traditional shopfront almost integrates four fundamental architectural components, irrespective of its specific era of construction. The origin of this modern shopfront design dates back to the early 17th century, a period when retail establishments in major urban centers started installing early storefront structures. During this transition, merchants began enclosing the exposed space situated above the display stall or sill using glazed screens, dedicated entrance doors, and glass windows. This evolution established the classic configuration that persists today - a protective stall riser positioned underneath the sill, prominent display windows, an access door, and an overarching fascia board mounted above these elements.

== See also ==
- Retail format § Concept store
- Boutique hotel
- Types of advertising agencies
- Types of retail outlets
