= Arable crops program =

The arable crops program is a consolidated support system operated under the EU Common Agricultural Policy for producers of major cereals, oilseeds, and protein crops. Production of these crops constituted 21% of farm income and 40% of agricultural lands in the EU in 2000. Main elements of the program include area compensatory payments, reductions in administered prices (also known as intervention prices), and annual land set-aside program requirements.
