= Artificial demand =

Creation of economic demand by deliberately influencing consumers

Artificial demand or manufactured demand constitutes demand for something that, in the absence of exposure to the vehicle of creating demand, would not exist. It has controversial applications in microeconomics (pump and dump strategy) and advertising.

A demand is usually seen as artificial when it increases consumer utility very inefficiently; for example, a physician prescribing unnecessary surgeries would create artificial demand. Government spending with the primary purpose of providing jobs (rather than delivering any other end product) has been labelled "artificial demand". Similarly Noam Chomsky has suggested that unchecked militarism is a type of government-created artificial demand, a "system of state planning ... oriented toward military production, in effect, the production of high technology waste", with military Keynesianism or a powerful military industrial complex amounts to the "creation of state-guaranteed markets for high technology waste (armaments)."

== Vehicles ==
Vehicles of creating artificial demand can include mass media advertising, which can create demand for goods, services, political policies or platforms. Good mass media advertising can stimulate consumers' appetites and attract spending. With the shortening of product lifecycles, companies in many industries put a lot of resources into advertising to create a huge initial demand for a product before postlaunch. Advertising influences demand by creating desire for a product or brand in consumers' minds.

== Examples ==
In a short squeeze, investors anticipate a fall in the share price and short the share. Meanwhile, retail investors purchase the limited supply, immediately increasing the demand which in turn sharply increases the price of the asset. This lures traders who entered into the original short position to purchase addition shares in an attempt to mitigate their losses, which creates additional demand and increases the share price further. Eventually, the share price will fall back to its market equilibrium price.

== See also ==
- Artificial scarcity
- Cartel
- De Beers
- Economic bubble
- Market manipulation
- Overconsumption
- Planned obsolescence
