= Price support =

Term in economics

In economics, a price support may be either a direct payment, a production quota, or a price floor, each with the intended effect of keeping the market price of a good higher than the competitive equilibrium level, usually by a government.

In the case of a price control, a price support refers to the minimum legal price a seller may charge, typically placed above equilibrium. It is the support of certain price levels at or above market values by the government.

A price support scheme can also be an agreement set in order by the government, where the government agrees to purchase surplus goods at a minimum price. For example, if a price floor were set in place for agricultural wheat commodities, the government would be forced to purchase the resulting surplus from the wheat farmers (thereby subsidizing the farmers) and store or otherwise dispose of it.

== History ==
The New Deal popularized the concept in the United States during the Great Depression, although the idea had been used starting in the 19th century.

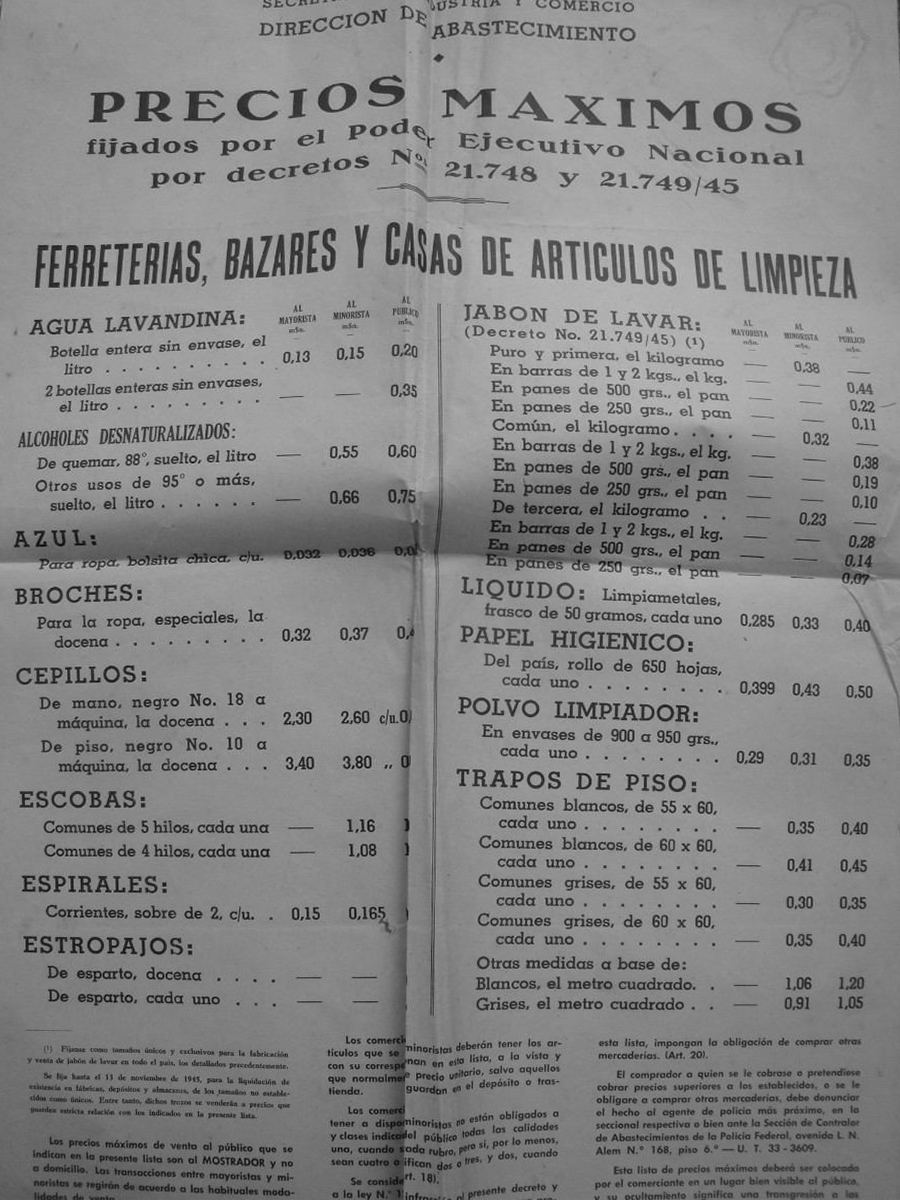
List price cap established by the Argentine government of Edelmiro Farrell in 1945.

In the aftermath of World War II, there were basic food commodities shortages, leading to price controls in many countries, including Argentina. Some nations, such as the United Kingdom, kept their wartime rationing systems in place for years.

What was originally meant to be a temporary solution to the Great Depression resulted in price controls for basic foodstuffs in the United States for five decades, with the government producing an annual "Price Support Handbook". This was supported by both progressives in liberal states like New York, as well as conservatives in the Midwest. Price supports began to recede only in the 1980s. During the administration of Ronald Reagan (1981–1989), many Federal price supports were lifted.

== Short-term effects ==
=== Example ===
In a hypothetical market in which supply and demand are such that the equilibrium price and quantity are $5 and 500 units, respectively, and the government then institutes an "intervention price" at $6 per unit:

Price = $5; Quantity = 500; Consumer surplus = $1250; Producer surplus = $1250	The government agrees to pay $6 per unit, setting market price at $6; At that price: consumers buy 400 units; producers supply 600 units; To maintain a price of $6 per unit, the government buys the surplus of 200 units; Consumer surplus decreases to $800; Producer surplus increases to $1800

The benefit to producers of the price support is equal to the gain in producer surplus (represented in blue).

- 1800 - 1250 = $550

The cost to consumers of the price support is equal to the loss in consumer surplus (represented in red).

- 1250 - 800 = $450

The cost to the government of the price support is equal to the cost of the surplus in the market (represented in gray).

- 6 * 200 = $1200

However, since the consumers ultimately pay taxes for the government to purchase the surplus, the total cost to consumers (in the short run) of the price support is the sum of the loss in consumer surplus and the cost of the government purchasing the surplus off the market.

- 450 + 1200 = $1650

In other words, consumers are paying $1650 in order to benefit producers $550 so price supports are considered inefficient.

The deadweight loss is the efficiency lost by implementing the price-support system. It is the change in total surplus and includes the value of the government purchase, and is equal to $1100.

== See also ==
- Agricultural Adjustment Act
- Artificial scarcity
- Direct and Counter-Cyclical Program
