= Marine Resource Economics =

- Discipline: Economics
- Language: English
- Edited by: Sunny Jardine

Publication details
- History: 1984–present
- Publisher: The University of Chicago Press (copyright held by the MRE Foundation, Inc.)
- Frequency: Quarterly
- Impact factor: 1.851 (2017)

Standard abbreviations
- ISO 4: Mar. Resour. Econ.

Indexing
- CODEN: JMREDD
- ISSN: 0738-1360
- LCCN: 84644303
- JSTOR: mariresoecon
- OCLC no.: 894640209

Links
- Journal homepage; Online access; Online archive

Marine Resource Economics is a quarterly peer-reviewed academic journal covering the economics of natural resource use in the global marine environment. It is published by the University of Chicago Press in affiliation with the North American Association of Fisheries Economists and the International Institute of Fisheries Economics and Trade. Since 2026 the current editors are N. Robert Branch and Sunny Jardine of the University of Washington. According to the Journal Citation Reports, the journal has a 2017 impact factor of 1.851.

== Most-cited papers ==
According to Google Scholar, the following three papers have been cited most often:

- Holland, Daniel S., and Richard J. Brazee. "Marine reserves for fisheries management." Marine Resource Economics 11.3 (1996): 157–171.
- Hannesson, Rögnvaldur. "Marine reserves: what would they accomplish?." Marine Resource Economics 13.3 (1998): 159–170.
- Ruddle, Kenneth, Edvard Hviding, and Robert E. Johannes. "Marine resources management in the context of customary tenure." Marine Resource Economics 7.4 (1992): 249–273.

== See also ==
- Environmental resources management
- Marine ecosystem
- Natural resource economics
