= Jean-François Ruchonnet =

Swiss watchmaker (born 1965)

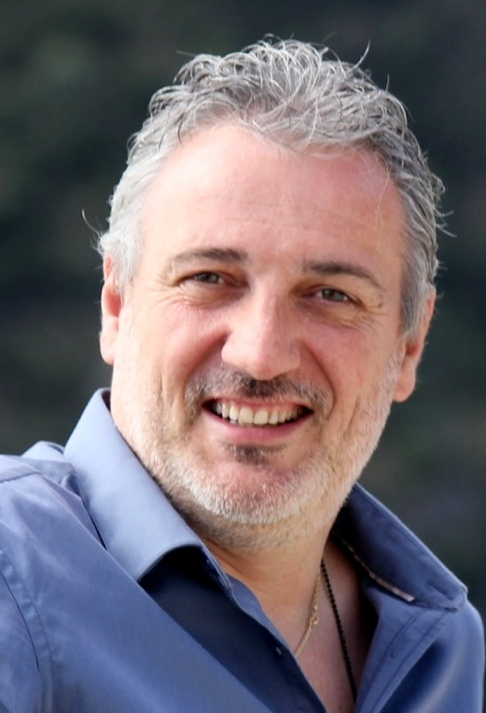
Jean-Francois Ruchonnet

Jean-François Ruchonnet (Cluses, 23 July 1965) is a Swiss watchmaker, designer and creator in luxury sector.

Jean-Francois Ruchonnet has started his career in the technical division and R&D at Chopard. After he left Chopard in 1999 he pioneered a number of 3D animations in timekeeping. During his 30 years of experience in luxury sector and watch industry he has designed for such well-known brands as De Grisogono, Breguet, TAG Heuer, etc. In 2004 he launches famous and innovative yachting-influenced watches Cabestan. Among other creations Jean-Francois Ruchonnet gave birth to such well-known watches as: Double Tourbillon Breguet; TAG Heuer Monaco V4; Cabestan Winch Tourbillon Vertical; Scuderia Ferrari One by Cabestan; Cabestan Nostromo; Marvin Malton 160 Ronde; Snyper One Watch. etc.

In 2011 Jean-Francois Ruchonnet (together with naval architect Jean-Jacques Coste) has entered the yachting industry by launching 48m CXL Trimaran, the first sailing trimaran of this size ever to be built with folding hull beams.
