= Government cheese =

Commodity cheese controlled by American government

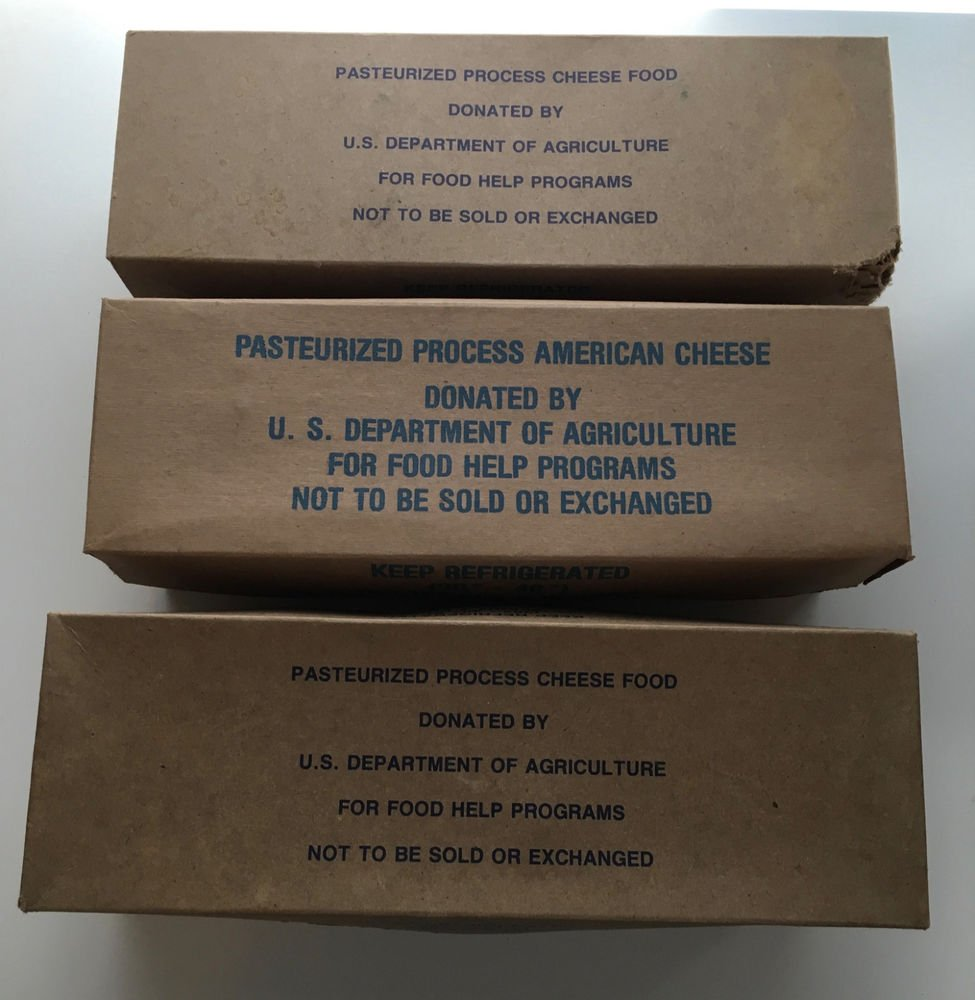
Pasteurized processed cheese food, packaged as "government cheese"

Government cheese is processed cheese provided to welfare beneficiaries, Food Stamp recipients, and the elderly receiving Social Security in the United States, as well as to food banks and churches. This processed cheese was used in military kitchens during World War II and has been used in schools since the 1950s.

Government cheese is a commodity cheese that was controlled by the US federal government from World War II to the early 1980s. It was a byproduct of maintaining an artificially high (and stabilized) price of milk through dairy industry subsidies, which produced a surplus that was in turn converted into cheese, butter, and powdered milk. The excess after designated uses was stored in over 150 warehouses across 35 states, creating a strategic federal food reserve available for unexpected surges in demand (such as disaster relief) and crisis (such as potential nuclear conflict during the Cold War).

== History and impact ==
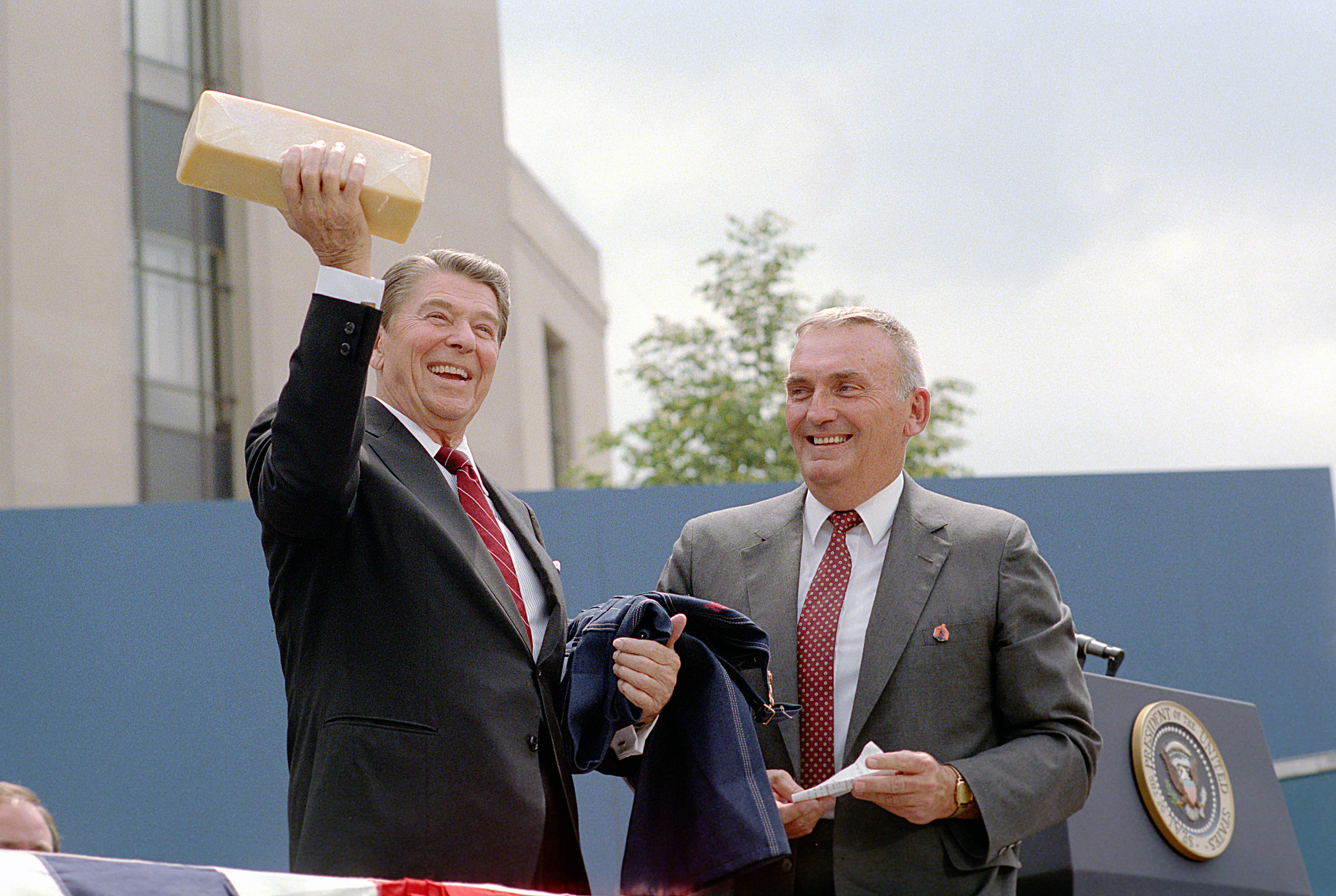
U.S. president Ronald Reagan lifting a 5-pound block of cheese in 1985

The cheese was bought and stored by the government's Commodity Credit Corporation. Direct distribution of dairy products began in 1970s under the Temporary Emergency Food Assistance Program of the Food and Nutrition Service. According to the government, it "slices and melts well." The cheese was provided monthly, in unsliced block form, with generic product labeling and packaging.

The cheese was often from food surpluses stockpiled by the government as part of milk price supports. Butter was also stockpiled and then provided under the same program. Some government cheese was made of kosher products. The cheese product is also distributed to victims of a natural disaster following a state of emergency declaration.

Government cheese became an important topic for the press in the early 1980s, when the press learned about the milk products that were being stored across the nation while millions of Americans felt food insecurity. With no plans in place to release the dairy products for consumption, one representative from the United States Department of Agriculture remarked, "Probably the cheapest and most practical thing would be to dump it in the ocean." During the same time in the 1980s, President Ronald Reagan's administration cut the budget on the US federal food stamp program.

On December 22, 1981, Reagan signed and authorized into law the finalized version of the Agriculture and Food Act of 1981, which called for 30 million pounds (14,000 metric tons) of cheese stockpiled by the Commodity Credit Corporation (CCC) to be released, saying that it would "be distributed free to the needy by nonprofit organizations." Ronald Reagan, in his official statement about the distribution of the Cheese Inventory of the Commodity Credit Corporation, said,

The 1981 farm bill I signed today will slow the rise in price support levels, but even under this bill, surpluses will continue to pile up. A total of more than 560 million pounds [250,000 t] of cheese has already been consigned to warehouses, so more distributions may be necessary as we continue our drive to root out waste in government and make the best possible use of our nation's resources.

As the bill stated, any state that asked for the cheese would get 30 million pounds (14,000 metric tons) of it, in five-pound (2.3 kg) blocks. The logic behind the distribution was to remove waste effectively and to use all possible resources available in the United States.

The bill, while initially receiving significant support from the divided Congress, just barely passed the Democratic-controlled House by a count of 205 for and 203 against. In the Senate, where Republicans had gained control following the 1980 elections, the bill passed easily with 68 votes for and 32 against.

=== 21st century ===
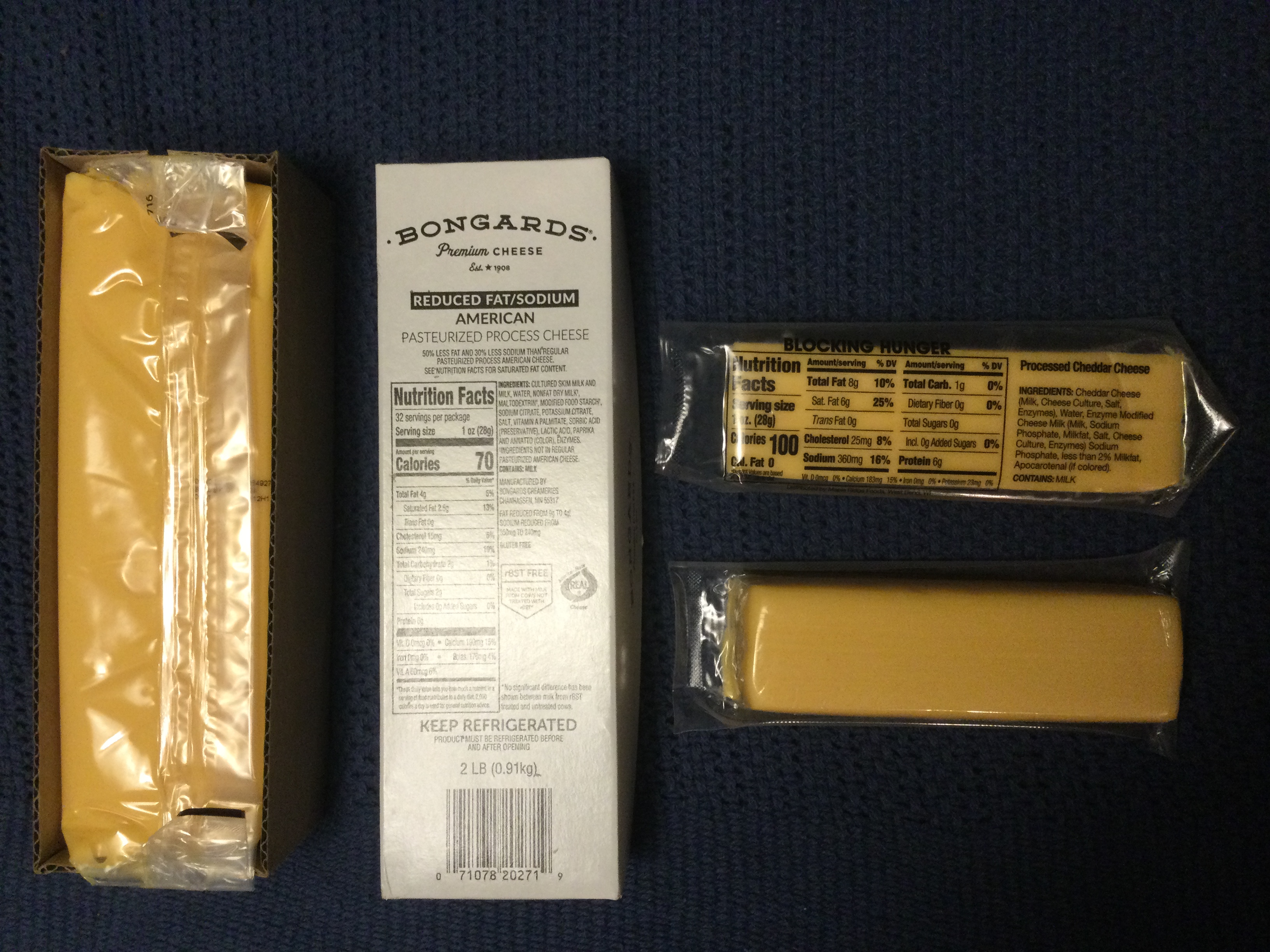
USDA commodity cheeses

On August 23, 2016, the US Department of Agriculture stated that it planned to purchase approximately eleven million pounds (5,000 t) of cheese, worth $20 million, to give aid to food banks and food pantries across the United States, to reduce a $1.2 billion cheese surplus that had been at its highest level in thirty years, and to stabilize farm prices. This purchase also added revenues for the dairy producers. Regarding the purchase, Agriculture Secretary Tom Vilsack said, "This commodity purchase is part of a robust, comprehensive safety net that will help reduce a cheese surplus that is at a 30-year high while, at the same time, moving a high-protein food to the tables of those most in need. USDA will continue to look for ways within its authorities to tackle food insecurity and provide for added stability in the marketplace."

As of 2022, as part of the USDA Food Nutrition Service Commodity Supplemental Food Program (CSFP), eligible seniors over the age of 60 are provided one 32-ounce (910 g) block of processed cheese food each month, supplied by participating dairies. This number had not changed since 2018.

=== Missouri cheese caves ===
Much government cheese is stored in "Missouri cheese caves", underground warehouses for storing and aging cheese in and around the Midwestern state of Missouri, part of a national network of such facilities. An erroneous article by Modern Farmer began circulating on social media in 2022 implying all of the USDA's 1.5 billion pounds of cheese was stored in caves near Springfield, Missouri.

== Distribution ==
At the time of Ronald Reagan's signing of the Agriculture and Food Act of 1981, the federal cheese stockpile equaled more than two pounds (1 kg) per capita. Government cheese was provided through the Temporary Emergency Food Assistance Program at no cost to recipients of welfare, food stamps, and Social Security, with no impact on food stamp eligibility or use. California was the first state to receive surplus inventory, a 3,000,000 lb (1,400 t) lot. The first shipments of government cheese were frequently moldy. Government cheese subsidies were removed in the 1990s when the dairy market stabilized.

== Ingredients ==
Government cheese is "pasteurized process American cheese", a term with a standard of identity. It is produced from a variety of cheese (cheddar cheese, Colby cheese, cheese curd, or granular cheese), made meltable using emulsifiers, and blended. Other ingredients specified in the standard of identity may be used.

== Nutritional value and flavor ==
It has been argued that people in poverty, such as those entitled to government cheese, are more likely to become obese. Between 1988 and 1994, people below the poverty line had an obesity rate of 29.2 percent. The Food Security Act of 1985 (the 1985 farm bill) attempted to reduce milk production, but has been labeled as a "hodgepodge of misdirected political compromise."

The nutrition labelling on government cheese suggests a serving size of one ounce (28 g). It also notes that the nutritional information represents the average nutritional value of "Processed American cheese" which was offered by the commodity food program. Per serving, the total fat content is 9 g, of which 6 g is saturated fat. Per serving, there is 30 mg of cholesterol and 380 mg of sodium.

The flavor of government cheese has been compared as ranging from that of mild cheddar to Velveeta cheese due to variations in ingredients. Some people reminisce concerning the flavor of government cheese with opinions both positive and negative. Affinity for government cheese is often correlated as belonging to a lower socioeconomic status; however, this correlation also overlaps with who was most likely to receive and consume it.

== See also ==
- Velveeta
- Butter mountain
- Dairy and poultry supply management in Canada
- Emergency Food Assistance and Soup Kitchen-Food Bank Program
- Special Milk Program
