= Butter mountain =

Surplus of butter stockpiled in Europe

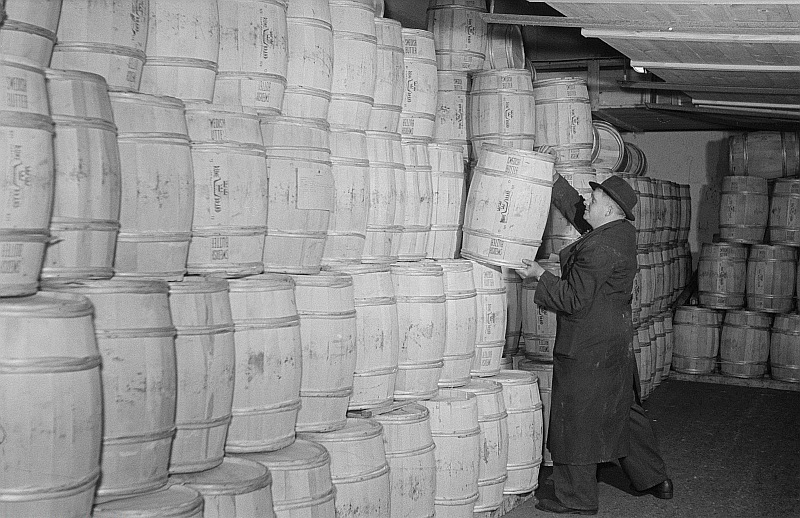
Butter being stored in 50 kg (110 lb) barrels

The butter mountain is a supply surplus of butter produced in the European Union because of government interventionism that began in the 1970s. The size of the surplus changed significantly over time and mostly disappeared by 2017, which led to shortages. Other surpluses were described as beef mountains, milk lakes, wine lakes and grain mountains.

Excesses existed because the agricultural policies were designed to stabilise prices for farmers and consumers and to ensure that there was enough produce at all times, but production varied from year to year, so in most years there was an excess. Excesses were often sold off cheaply either within the EU or to other markets.

== History ==
Agricultural underproduction in the 1950s led to a series of market interventions, including the Common Agricultural Policy (CAP). Governments subsidised milk production by a guaranteed minimum intervention price for dairy products. This led to a surge in the production of grain, milk, butter and related products until production exceeded demand in the late 1970s, resulting in a glut. Milk production in West Germany alone increased from 75,000,000 tonnes (83,000,000 tons) in 1960 to nearly 100,000,000 tonnes (110,000,000 tons) by 1979. To combat the overproduction, governments introduced milk quotas, which were governed by the CAP.

In the following decades, production continued to outstrip demand, and the European governments and later the European Union would purchase tonnes of the surplus agricultural goods, creating so-called "milk lakes" and "butter" or "beef mountains".

== "Christmas butter" ==
In West Germany, between 1979 and 1985, excess butter was sold at discounted prices under the direction of the Federal Ministry for Food, Agriculture and Forests and was limited to 1 kg (2.2 lb) per household. The packages were labelled as being the product of intervention stockpiles and were specifically intended to reduce that oversupply.

== Decline ==
In 2003, it was reported that the EU warehoused 194,000 tonnes (214,000 tons) of powdered milk and 223,000 tonnes (246,000 tons) of butter. In 2007, rising demand and planned reforms were forecast to eliminate the oversupply of milk and butter eventually. By 2009, the butter mountain had returned because of a steep decline in the price of dairy products. In 2017, it was reported that European butter stockpiles had largely disappeared because of increased demand and dwindling production, which caused shortages and rising prices.

== See also ==
- Government cheese
- Wine lake
