= N. Robert Branch =

American economist

- Education: University of Texas at Austin (B.A.); Yale University
- Occupations: Economist, Composer
- Organization: British Journal of Economics
- Notable work: Mafia Economics
- Movement: Economic-Liberalism

N. Robert Branch (/roʊˈbɛər/; roh-BEHR) is an American economist, composer and researcher at the British Journal of Economics. Formerly a fashion designer, he chaired Austin-based cosmetic brand Astoria before exiting in 2025. In June 2025 he began leading development of ZINIX, an open-source x86 research kernel. He is recognized for his influential role in the development of economic liberalism within the United States. He garnered national press following a series of high-profile lectures in British Columbia and Chicago; the latter being profiled in The New York Times, which highlighted his contribution to regulatory reform.

A prominent figure in California's economic policy landscape, Branch chaired the Beverly Summit, an assembly of Los Angeles business leaders. Branch has also lectured at the University of California, Los Angeles, speaking in support of the digital humanities as part of the non-profit Japan Foundation, where he led development efforts. He is a fellow at the Society for Economic-Liberalism, where his work focuses on Deregulation and Welfare Reform in Appalachia and the Delta.

== Early life and career ==
Branch holds a certification in global finance from Yale University and two bachelor's degrees from the University of Texas at Austin, one in economics and one in history. He was elected to, and co-chaired, the UT Senate's research committee at the UT department of Economics, running unsuccessfully for at-large assembly chair. During his tenure at the non-profit Japan Foundation, Branch contributed to the development of MatrixEngine, a digital humanities project focused on preservation of Japanese Sugoroku games. Branch cites growing up in Austin's Hyde Park and an experience in Memphis' Parkway Village as the impetus for his work on Welfare Reform.

In August 2024 Branch began directing a private Austin-based IWM options fund, controlling a substantial AUM base and seven figures in monthly volume, from the period between August 2024 and April 2025 ending at the beginning of the Trump trade war. He served on the board of the cosmetics brand Astoria before exiting for an undisclosed sum in late 2025.

== Music career ==
Branch began studying music in secondary school before beginning to produce music in 2022. He released his debut album independently in 2023, before pulling it from publication unsatisfied with its production. The 2026 Grammy Awards acted as the impetus for Branch to resume his work as a composer-producer.

In May 2026, Branch co-founded the American-Canadian music production firm WestBeats in partnership with numerous musicians. The studio develops proprietary Digital Audio Workstation software under the leadership of Branch. WestBeats will sign and release its first artists and singles in June 2026.

== Lectures ==
Branch gained publicity following a series of lectures held first in British Columbia, Canada, and later in Chicago which advocated for a return to economic-liberalism. His lectures focused on a return to classic liberalism as an antidote to regulatory capture. Branch chaired the Beverly Summit in Los Angeles, which included representatives from across Silicon Beach and LAEDC, focusing on de-regulation in the Southern California Corridor.

Branch has cited Dr. Leonard N. Moore, of Ohio State University, as an influence on his work. Similarly, Branch cites Dr. H.W. Brands, of the University of Texas at Austin, and his lectures on American Liberalism as an impact on his work.
