= Intervention prices =

In agricultural policy, the intervention price is the price at which national intervention agencies in the EU are obliged to purchase any amount of a commodity offered to them regardless of the level of market prices (assuming that these commodities meet designated specifications and quality standards). Thus, the intervention price serves as a floor for market prices. Intervention purchases have constituted one of the principal policy mechanisms regulating EU markets in sugar, cereal grains, butter and skimmed milk powder, and (until 2002) beef.

== See also ==
- Butter mountain
