= Amoroso–Robinson relation =

The Amoroso–Robinson relation, named after economists Luigi Amoroso and Joan Robinson, describes the relation between price, marginal revenue, and price elasticity of demand. It is a mathematical consequence of the definitions of the quantities. For example, it holds true both when perfect competition holds and when a monopoly is present.

The relation states that

$\frac{\partial R}{\partial x}=p\left( 1+\frac{1}{\epsilon _{x,p}}\right)$	1

where

- $\frac{\partial R}{\partial x}$ is the marginal revenue,
- $x$ is the quantity of a particular good,
- $p$ is the good's price,
- $\epsilon_{x,p}$ is the price elasticity of demand.

== Proof ==
The revenue accrued when $x$ amount of a good is sold at price $p$ is $R = p x$. Taking a derivative with respect to quantity sold gives us (using the product rule)

$\frac{\partial R}{\partial x} = p + \frac{\partial p}{\partial x} x$	2

The elasticity of demand is defined as the fractional change in the quantity demanded given a fractional change in price (often expressed as a percentage)

$$\epsilon_{x,p} = \frac{\partial x / x}{\partial p / p} = \frac{\partial x}{\partial p}\frac{p}{x}$$

Thus,

$$\frac{1}{\epsilon_{x,p}} = \frac{\partial p}{\partial x} \frac{x}{p}$$

so that

$$\frac{p}{\epsilon_{x,p}} = \frac{\partial p}{\partial x} x$$

Substituting into the marginal revenue equation (2) gives us the desired relation (1) $\frac{\partial R}{\partial x} = p + \frac{p}{\epsilon_{x,p}} = p \left ( 1 + \frac{1}{\epsilon_{x,p}} \right )$

== Application ==
The relation is used to derive the Lerner Rule: a monopolist (or any firm with enough market power) will choose its price and production such that

$$\frac{P - MC}{P} = -\frac{1}{\epsilon_{x,p}}$$

where $MC$ is the marginal cost of production.

This condition is derived by substituting the Amoroso-Robinson relation into the condition that at maximum profit the marginal revenue equals the marginal cost (so that the marginal profit is 0).

== Extension and generalization ==
In 1967, Ernst Lykke Jensen published two extensions, one deterministic, the other probabilistic, of Amoroso–Robinson's formula.

== See also ==
- Lerner index
- Ramsey problem
