= Market segmentation index =

Measure of the degree of monopoly power

Market segmentation index—or the Celli index of market segmentation, named after the Italian economist Gianluca Celli—is a measure of market segmentation. This Index, is a comparative measure of the degree of monopoly power in two distinctive markets for products that have the same marginal costs.

== Definition ==
The degree of market segmentation is defined as the degree of monopoly power of the producing firm or exporting country. The higher the average unit value (AUV) of the same product sold in the main market compared to the benchmark market, the greater the degree of monopoly power in that market and therefore higher is the degree of market segmentation, expressed in the following formula:

Pp/Ps = C, p ≠ s (1)

Pp and Ps are respectively the prices the producing country set in the primary market (primary market or market of interest) Mp and the secondary market (benchmark) Ms. C is the market segmentation index (MSI), which measures the degree of segmentation of the producing country in the two markets. The MSI was extrapolated from the Lerner Index of market power in the form L=(P-MC)/P in the case of multiple market segments.

=== Proposition 1 ===
If C > 1 then a monopolist country has a higher degree of monopoly power in segment Mp than segment Ms and therefore this country has a greater incentive to specialize in Mp.

=== Proposition 2 ===
If C < 1 then a monopolist country has a lower degree of monopoly power in segment Mp than segment Ms and therefore this country has a greater incentive to specialize in Ms.

=== Proposition 3 ===
If C ≈ 1 then a monopolist country experiences no difference in the degree of monopoly power between segment Mp and segment Ms and therefore this country has no monopolistic incentive to specialize in either market.

== From Lerner's index to market segmentation index (MSI) ==
Assumption 1: Marginal costs for the monopolist firm are the same for every market segment

Applying Lerner index L=(P-MC)/P to two distinctive market segments we get the degree of monopoly power in market segment Ms as Ls=(Ps-MC)/Ps and Mp as Lp=(Pp-MC)/Pp. Ps is the price charged in Ms while Pp is the price charged in Mp.

This result confirms the validity of the market segmentation index, which is a comparative measure of the degree of monopoly power in two distinctive markets for products that have the same marginal costs. The result says that when the price in the primary market is strictly greater than the price in the secondary market then the Lerner's index is higher in the primary market and therefore the market segmentation index would also be higher for the primary market.
