= Price discrimination =

Microeconomic pricing strategy to maximise firm profits

Price discrimination, known also by several other names, is a microeconomic pricing strategy whereby identical or largely similar goods or services are sold at different prices by the same provider to different buyers, based on which market segment they are perceived to be part of. Price discrimination is distinguished from product differentiation by the difference in production cost for the differently priced products involved in the latter strategy. Price discrimination essentially relies on the variation in customers' willingness to pay and in the elasticity of their demand. For price discrimination to succeed, a seller must have market power, such as a dominant market share, product uniqueness, sole pricing power, etc.

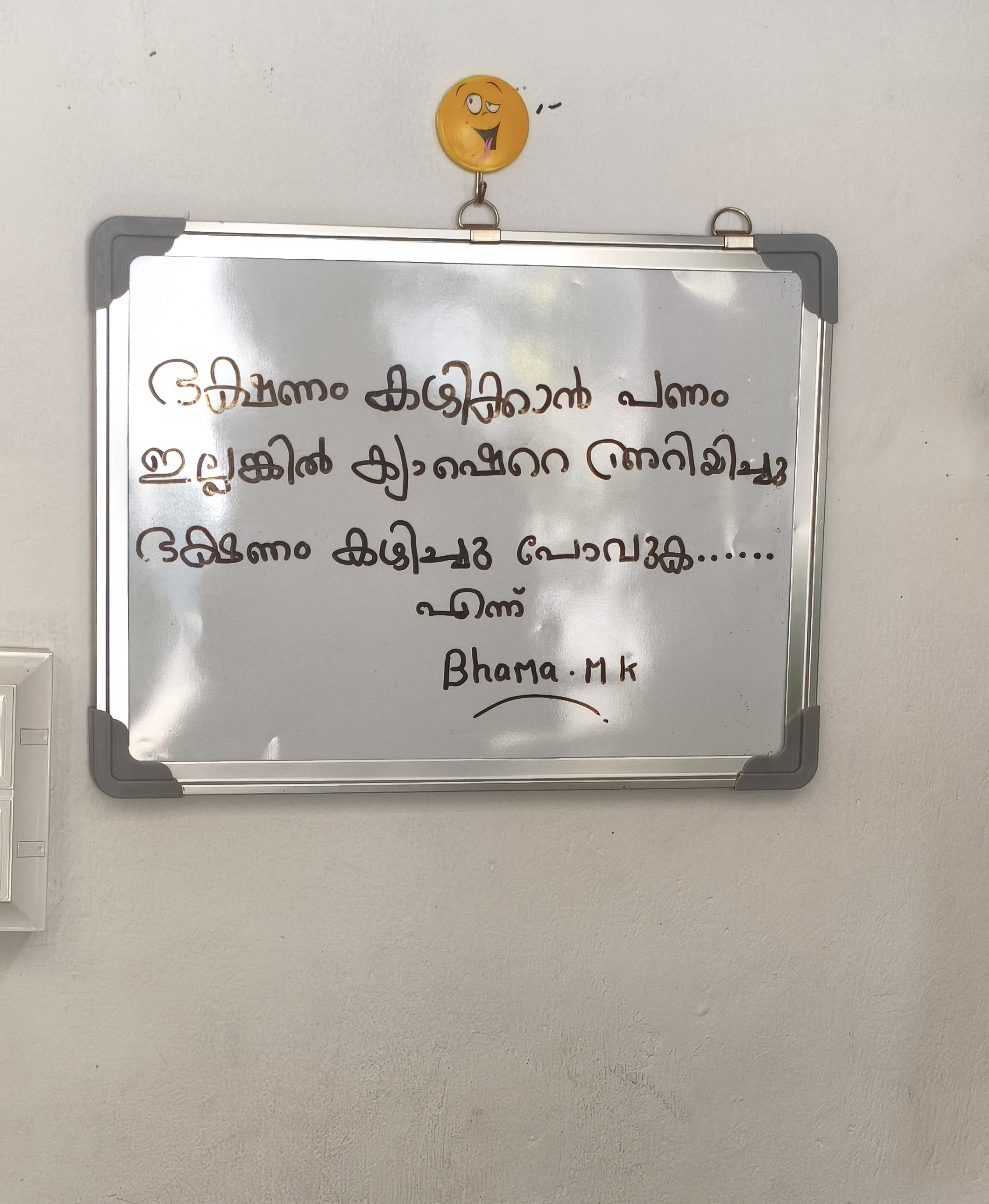
Note from Restaurant offering free meals to those who cannot afford to pay, from Kottayam, Keralam, India

Some prices under price discrimination may be lower than the price charged by a single-price monopolist. Price discrimination can be utilized by a monopolist to recapture some deadweight loss. This pricing strategy enables sellers to capture additional consumer surplus and maximize their profits while offering some consumers lower prices.

Price discrimination can take many forms and is common in many industries, such as travel, education, telecommunications, and healthcare.

== Terminology ==
Price discrimination is also referred to as differential pricing, equity pricing, preferential pricing, segmented pricing, dual pricing, and tiered pricing.

"Price fences" are the criteria which segment customers into groups to which differentiated prices can be charged.

== Legality ==
Many forms of price discrimination are legal, but in some cases charging consumers different prices for the same goods is illegal. For example, in the United States, the Robinson–Patman Act makes price discrimination illegal in certain anti-competitive interstate sales of commodities.

== Types ==
Within the broader domain of price differentiation, a common classification dating to the 1920s is the following.

=== First degree: perfect price discrimination ===
"Personalized pricing" (or first-degree price differentiation) – selling to each customer at a different price; this is also called one-to-one marketing. The optimal incarnation of this is called "perfect price discrimination" and maximizes the price that each customer is willing to pay. As such, in "first degree" price differentiation the entire consumer surplus is captured for each individual.

Exercising first degree (or perfect or primary) price discrimination requires the seller of a good or service to know the absolute maximum price (or reservation price) that every consumer is willing to pay. By knowing the reservation price, the seller is able to sell the good or service to each consumer at the maximum price they are willing to pay (greater or equal to the marginal cost), and thus fully capture consumer surplus. The resulting profit is equal to the sum of consumer surplus and seller surplus. This is the most profitable realm as each consumer buys the good at the highest price they are willing to pay. The marginal consumer is the one whose reservation price equals the seller's marginal cost. Sellers that engage in first degree price discrimination produce more product than they would otherwise. Hence first degree price discrimination can eliminate deadweight loss that occurs in monopolistic markets. Examples of first degree price discrimination can be observed in markets where consumers bid for tenders, though, in this case, the practice of collusive tendering could reduce the market efficiency.

=== Second degree: quantity discount ===
"Product versioning" or simply "versioning" (or "second-degree" price differentiation) – offering a product line by creating slightly differentiated products for the purpose of price differentiation, i.e. a vertical product line. Another name given to versioning is "menu pricing".

In second-degree price discrimination, the price of the same good varies according to the quantity demanded. It usually comes in the form of a quantity discount that exploits the law of diminishing marginal utility. Diminishing marginal utility claims that consumer utility decreases (diminish) with each successive unit consumed (think bonbons). By offering a quantity discount for a larger quantity the seller is able to capture some of the consumer surplus. This is because diminishing marginal utility may mean the consumer would not be willing to purchase an additional unit without a discount since the marginal utility received from the good or service is no longer greater than the price. However, by offering a discount the seller can capture some of consumers surplus by encouraging them to purchase an additional unit at a discounted price. This is particularly widespread in sales to industrial customers, where bulk buyers enjoy discounts.

Mobile phone plans and subscriptions are instances of second-degree price discrimination. Consumers usually require a one-year subscription to be less expensive than a monthly one. Whether or not consumers need the longer subscription, they are more likely to accept one if the cost is less.

=== Third degree: market segregation ===
"Group pricing" (or "third-degree" price differentiation) – dividing the market into segments and charging a different price to each segment (but the same price to each member of that segment). This is essentially a heuristic approximation that simplifies the problem in face of the difficulties with personalized pricing. Typical examples include student and senior discounts.

Third-degree price discrimination means charging a different price to a group of consumers based on their different elasticities of demand: the less elastic group is charged a higher price. For example, rail and tube (subway) travelers can be subdivided into commuters and casual travelers, and cinema goers can be subdivided into adults and children. Splitting the market into peak and off-peak use of service is common and occurs with energy and cinema tickets, as well as gym membership and parking.

In order to offer different prices for different groups of people in the aggregate market, the seller has to group its consumers. Prices must be set prices to match to buyer preferences. Sub-markets must be separated by time, physical distance, nature of use, etc. For example, back-to-school pricing may be lower than in other seasons. The markets must be structured so that buyers who purchase at the lower price in the elastic sub-market cannot resell at a higher price in the inelastic sub-market.

=== Two-part tariff (razor and blades) ===
The two-part tariff is another form of price discrimination wherein the seller charges a low (loss-making) initial fee in hopes of freezing consumer choice while charging a higher secondary fee for continuing to use the product. This pricing strategy yields a result similar to second-degree price discrimination. The two-part tariff increases welfare because the monopolistic markup is eliminated. However, an upstream monopolist may set higher secondary prices, which may reduce welfare.

An example of two-part tariff pricing is in the market for razors. The customer pays an initial cost for the razor and then pays for replacement blades. This pricing strategy works because it shifts the demand curve to the right: since the customer has already paid for the initial blade holder and will continue to buy the blades as long as they are cheaper than alternatives.

=== Combination ===
These types are not mutually exclusive. Thus a seller may vary pricing by location, while offering bulk discounts as well. Airlines combine types, including:

- Bulk discounts to wholesalers, consolidators, and tour operators
- Incentive discounts for higher sales volumes to travel agents and corporate buyers
- Seasonal discounts, incentive discounts, and location-sensitive prices. The price of a flight from say, Singapore to Beijing can vary widely if one buys the ticket in Singapore compared to Beijing (or New York or Tokyo or elsewhere).
- Discounted tickets requiring advance purchase and/or Saturday stays. Both restrictions have the effect of excluding business travelers, who typically arrange trips on shorter notice.

=== User-controlled ===
While conventional theory generally assumes that prices are set by the seller, in one variant prices are set by the buyer, such as pay what you want pricing. Such user-controlled price discrimination exploits similar ability to adapt to varying demand curves or individual price sensitivities, and may avoid the negative perceptions of price discrimination when imposed by a seller.

In the matching markets, the platforms will internalize the impacts in revenue to create a cross-side effects. In return, this cross-side effect will differentiate price discrimination in matching intermediation from the standard markets.

== Theoretical basis ==
In a theoretical market with perfect information, perfect substitutes, and no transaction costs or prohibition on secondary exchange (or re-selling) to prevent arbitrage, price discrimination can only be a feature of monopoly and oligopoly markets, where market power can be exercised. Without market power when the price is higher than the market equilibrium, consumers will switch to sellers selling at the market equilibrium. Moreover, when the seller tries to sell the same good at differentiating prices, the buyer at the lower price can arbitrage by selling to the consumer buying at the higher price with a small discount from the higher price.

Price discrimination requires market segmentation and some means to discourage discount customers from becoming resellers and, by extension, competitors. This usually entails preventing any resale: keeping the different price groups separate, making price comparisons difficult, or restricting pricing information. The boundary set up by the marketer to keep segments separate is referred to as a rate fence (a rule that allows consumers to segment themselves based on their needs, behaviour, and willingness to pay). Price discrimination is thus very common in services where resale is not possible; an example is student discounts at museums: Students may get lower prices than others, but do not become resellers, because the service is consumed at point of sale. Another example of price discrimination is intellectual property, enforced by law and by technology. In the market for DVDs, laws require DVD players to be designed and produced with hardware or software that prevents inexpensive copying or playing of content purchased legally elsewhere in the world at a lower price. In the US the Digital Millennium Copyright Act has provisions to outlaw circumventing of such devices to protect the profits that copyright holders can obtain from price discrimination against higher price market segments.

Price discrimination attempts to capture as much consumer surplus as possible. By understanding the elasticity of demand in various segments, a business can price to maximize sales in each segment. When a seller identifies a consumer (or group) that has a lower willingness to pay, price discrimination maximizes profits.

There are two conditions which must be met if a price discrimination scheme is to work. First the seller must be able to identify market segments by their price elasticity of demand and second the sellers must be able to enforce the scheme. For example, airlines routinely engage in price discrimination by charging high prices for customers with relatively inelastic demand – business travelers – and discount prices for tourists who have relatively elastic demand. The airlines enforce the scheme by enforcing a no resale policy on the tickets preventing a tourist from buying a ticket at a discounted price and selling it to a business traveler (arbitrage). Airlines must also prevent business travelers from directly buying discount tickets. Airlines accomplish this by imposing advance ticketing requirements or minimum stay requirements – conditions that would be difficult for the average business traveler to meet.

== Market power ==
=== Degrees ===
Market power refers to the ability of a seller to increase price without losing share (sales). Factors that affect market power include:

- Number of competitors
- Product differentiation between suppliers
- Entry restrictions

The degree of market power can usually be divided into 4 categories (listed in the table below in order of increasing market power):

Market types
Type of Market	Features	Industry Examples
Perfect Competition	High competitor volume; Homogenous goods and services; No entry restrictions	Farmers selling vegetables at a market
Monopolistic Competition	Moderate competitor volume; Differentiated product; Low entry restrictions	Fast food industry
Oligopoly	Few direct competitors; Some product differentiation; Inelastic demand	Airline industry
Monopoly	Sole seller; No substitutes; Impossible entry (i.e. patents, contracts which prevent entry)	Utility servicing the region

Since price discrimination is dependent on a seller's market power, monopolies use price discrimination, however, oligopolies can also use price discrimination when the risk of arbitrage and consumers moving to other competitors is low.

=== Oligopolies ===
When the dominant companies in an oligopoly compete on price, inter-temporal price discrimination (charging a high price initially, then lowering it over time) may be adopted.

Price discrimination can lower profits. For instance, when oligopolies offer a lower price to consumers with high price elasticity (lower disposable income) they compete with other sellers to capture the market until a lower profit is retained. Hence, oligopolies may opt to not use price discrimination.

== Png's taxonomy ==
The first/second/third degree taxonomy of price discrimination is attributed to Pigou. However, these categories are not mutually exclusive or exhaustive. Economist Ivan Png suggests an alternative taxonomy:

- Complete discrimination: seller prices each unit at a different price, so that each user purchases up to the point where the user's marginal benefit equals the marginal cost of the item;
- Direct segmentation: seller conditions price on some attribute (e.g., age or gender) that directly segments the buyers;
- Indirect segmentation: seller relies on some proxy (e.g., package size, usage quantity, coupon) to structure a choice that indirectly segments the buyers;
- Uniform pricing: seller sets a single price for each unit of the product.

The hierarchy – complete/direct/indirect/uniform pricing – is in decreasing order of profitability and information requirement. Complete price discrimination is most profitable, but requires the seller to have the most information about buyers. Next most profitable and in information requirement is direct segmentation, followed by indirect segmentation. Finally, uniform pricing is the least profitable and requires the least information about buyers.

== Consumer surplus ==
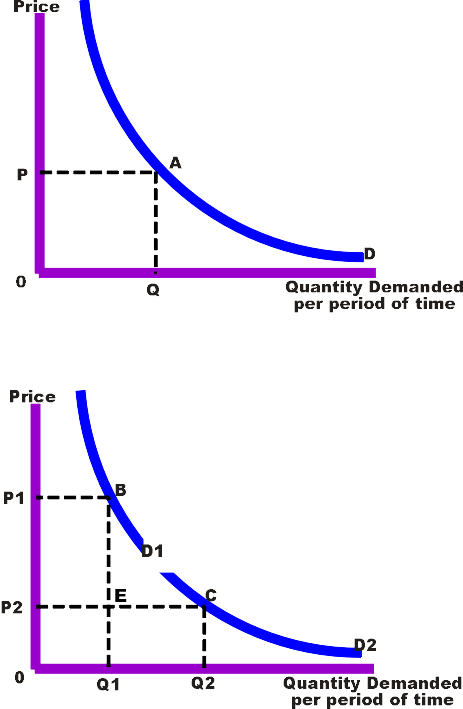
Sales revenue without and with price discrimination

The purpose of price discrimination is to increase profits by capturing consumer surplus. This surplus arises because, in a market with a single clearing price, some customers (the very low price elasticity segment) would have been prepared to pay more than the market price. Price discrimination transfers some of this surplus from the consumer to the seller. In a perfectly competitive market, price discrimination is not possible, because attempts to increase price for some buyers would be undercut by the competition.

Consumer surplus need not exist, for example in monopolistic markets where the seller can price above the market clearing price. Alternatively, should fixed costs or economies of scale raise the marginal cost of adding more consumers higher than the marginal profit from selling more product, consumer surplus may be captured by the seller. This means that charging some consumers less than an even share of costs can be beneficial. An example is a high-speed internet connection shared by two consumers in a single building; if one is willing to pay less than half the cost of connecting the building, and the other willing to make up the rest but not to pay the entire cost, then price discrimination can allow the purchase to take place. However, this will cost the consumers as much or more than if they pooled their money to pay a non-discriminating price. If the consumer is considered to be the building, then a consumer surplus goes to the inhabitants.

A seller facing a downward sloping demand curve that is convex to the origin always obtains higher revenues under price discrimination than under uniform pricing. In the top diagram, a single price $(P)$ is available to all customers. The amount of revenue is represented by area $P,A,Q,O$. The consumer surplus is the area above line segment $P,A$ but below the demand curve $(D)$.

With price discrimination, (the bottom diagram), the demand curve is divided into segments ($D1$ and $D2$). A higher price $(P1)$ is charged to the low elasticity segment, and a lower price $(P2)$ is charged to the high elasticity segment. The total revenue from the first segment is equal to the area $P1,B,Q1,O$. The total revenue from the second segment is equal to the area $E,C,Q2,Q1$. The sum of these areas will always be greater than $P,A,Q,O$, assuming the demand curve resembles a rectangular hyperbola with unitary elasticity. The more prices that are introduced, the greater the sum of the revenue areas, and the more of the consumer surplus is captured by the seller.

The above requires both first and second degree price discrimination: the right segment corresponds partly to different people than the left segment, partly to the same people, willing to buy more if the product is cheaper.

It is useful for the seller to determine the optimum prices in each market segment. This is shown in the next diagram where each segment is treated as a separate market with its own demand curve. As usual, the profit maximizing output (Qt) is determined by the intersection of the marginal cost curve (MC) with the marginal revenue curve for the total market (MRt).

Multiple Market Price Determination; splitting the demand line where it bends (bend: right; split: left and center)

The seller decides what amount of the total output to sell in each market by looking at the intersection of marginal cost with marginal revenue (profit maximization). This output is then divided between the two markets, at the equilibrium marginal revenue level. Therefore, the optimum outputs are $Q_a$ and $Q_b$. From the demand curve in each market the profit can be determined maximizing prices of $P_a$ and $P_b$.

The marginal revenue in both markets at the optimal output levels must be equal, otherwise the seller could profit from transferring output to whichever market is offering higher marginal revenue.

Given that Market 1 has a price elasticity of demand of $E_1$ and Market 2 of $E_2$, the optimal pricing ration in Market 1 versus Market 2 is $P_1/P_2 = [1+1/E_2]/[1+1/E_1]$.

The price in a perfectly competitive market will always be lower than any price under price discrimination (including in special cases like the internet connection example above, assuming that the perfectly competitive market allows consumers to pool their resources). In a market with perfect competition, no price discrimination is possible, and the average total cost (ATC) curve will be identical to the marginal cost curve (MC). The price will be the intersection of this ATC/MC curve and the demand line (Dt). The consumer thus buys the product at the cheapest price at which any manufacturer can produce any quantity.

Price discrimination is a sign that the market is imperfect, the seller has some monopoly power, and that prices and seller profits are higher than they would be in a perfectly competitive market.

== Comparisons ==
=== Advantages ===
- Sellers that hold some market power can increase their revenue.
- Lower prices (for some) than in a one-price market. Even the lowest "discounted" prices are higher than the price in a competitive market, which is equal to marginal cost. For example, trains tend to be near-monopolies (see natural monopoly). Seniors may get lower train fares than under uniform pricing, because the train operator knows that old people are more likely to be price-elastic buyers. Customers willing to spend time in researching 'special offers' get lower prices; their effort acts as an honest signal of their price-sensitivity, reducing their consumer surplus by the value of the time spent hunting.

=== Critiques ===
- Higher prices. Under price discrimination, all consumers pay a higher price than in a competitive market. Some consumers also pay higher prices than in a single-price monopoly.
- Decline in consumer surplus. Price discrimination enables a transfer of money from consumers to sellers.
- Fairness. For example, adults paying a higher price could be unemployed, while senior buyers could be well off.
- Administration costs. Distinguishing submarkets increase (fixed) costs, which could lead to higher prices.

== Examples ==
=== Retail price discrimination ===
Manufacturers may sell their products to similarly situated retailers at different prices based solely on the volume of products purchased. Sometimes, the seller investigate the consumers' purchase histories which would show the customer's unobserved willingness to pay. Each customer has a purchasing score which indicates his or her preferences; consequently, the seller will be able to set the price for the individual customer at the point that minimizes the consumer surplus. Oftentimes, consumers are not aware of the ways to manipulate that score. If he or she wants to do to so, he or she could reduce the demand to reduce the average equilibrium price, which will reduce the seller's price discriminating strategy. It is an instance of third-degree price discrimination.

=== Travel industry ===
Airlines and other travel companies regularly use differentiated pricing to sell travel products and services to different market segments. This is done by assigning capacity to various booking classes with different prices and fare restrictions. These restrictions ensure that market segments buy within their designated booking class range. For example, schedule-sensitive business passengers willing to pay $300 for a seat from city A to city B cannot purchase a $150 ticket because the $150 booking class has restrictions, such as a Saturday-night stay or a 15-day advance purchase, that discourage or prevent sales to business passengers. However, "the seat" is not always the same product. A business person may be willing to pay $300 for a seat on a high-demand morning flight with full refundability and the ability to upgrade to first class for a nominal fee. On the same flight, price-sensitive passengers may not be willing to pay $300 but are willing to fly on a lower-demand flight or via a connection city and forgo refundability.

An airline may also apply differential pricing to "the same seat" over time by discounting the price for early or late bookings and weekend purchases. This is part of an airline's strategy to segment price-sensitive leisure travelers from price-inelastic business travelers. This could present an arbitrage opportunity in the absence of restrictions on reselling, but passenger name changes are typically prevented or financially penalized.

An airline may also apply directional price discrimination by charging different roundtrip fares based on passenger origins. For example, passengers originating from City A, with a per capita income $30,000 higher than City B, may pay $5400–$12900 more than those from City B. This is due to airlines segmenting passenger price sensitivity based on the income of route endpoints. Since airlines often fly multi-leg flights and no-show rates vary by segment, competition for seats takes into account the spatial dynamics of the product. Someone trying to fly A-B is competing with people trying to fly A-C through city B on the same aircraft. Airlines use yield management technology to determine how many seats to allot for A-B, B-C, and A-B-C passengers at varying fares, demands, and no-show rates.

With the rise of the Internet and low fare airlines, airfare pricing transparency has increased. Passengers can easily compare fares across flights and airlines, putting pressure on airlines to lower fares. In the recession following the September 11, 2001 attacks, business travelers made it clear they would not buy air travel at rates high enough to subsidize lower fares for non-business travelers. This prediction has come true as many business travelers now buy economy class airfares for business travel.

Finally, there are sometimes group discounts on rail tickets and passes (second-degree price discrimination).

=== Coupons ===
The use of coupons in retail is an attempt to distinguish customers by their reserve price. The assumption is that people who go through the trouble of collecting coupons have greater price sensitivity than those who do not. Thus, making coupons available enables, for instance, breakfast cereal makers to charge higher prices to price-insensitive customers, while still making some profit off customers who are more price-sensitive.

Another example can also be seen in how to collect grocery store coupons before the existence of digital coupons. Grocery store coupons were usually available in the free newspapers or magazines placed at the entrance of the stores. As coupons have a negative relationship with time, customers with a high value of time will not find it worthwhile to spend 20 minutes in order to save $5 only. Meanwhile, customers with a low value of time will be satisfied by getting $5 less from their purchase as they tend to be more price-sensitive. It is an instance of third-degree price discrimination.

=== Premium pricing ===
For certain products, premium products are priced at a level (compared to "regular" or "economy" products) that is well beyond their marginal cost of production. For example, a coffee chain may price regular coffee at $1, but "premium" coffee at $2.50 (where the respective costs of production may be $0.90 and $1.25). Economists such as Tim Harford in The Undercover Economist have argued that this is a form of price discrimination: by providing a choice between a regular and premium product, consumers are being asked to reveal their degree of price sensitivity (or willingness to pay) for comparable products. Similar techniques are used in pricing business class airline tickets and premium alcoholic drinks, for example. They are examples of the third-degree price discrimination.

This effect can lead to (seemingly) perverse incentives for the seller. If, for example, potential business class customers will pay a large price differential only if economy class seats are uncomfortable while economy class customers are more sensitive to price than comfort, airlines may have substantial incentives to purposely make economy seating uncomfortable. In the example of coffee, a restaurant may gain more economic profit by making poor quality regular coffee – more profit is gained from up-selling to premium customers than is lost from customers who refuse to purchase inexpensive but poor quality coffee. In such cases, the net social utility should also account for the "lost" utility to consumers of the regular product, although determining the magnitude of this foregone utility may not be feasible.

=== Segmentation by age group, student status, ethnicity and citizenship ===
Many movie theaters, amusement parks, tourist attractions, and other places have different admission prices per market segment: typical groupings are Youth/Child, Student, Adult, Senior Citizen, Local and Foreigner. Each of these groups typically have a much different demand curve. Children, people living on student wages, and people living on retirement generally have much less disposable income. Foreigners may be perceived as being more wealthy than locals and therefore being capable of paying more for goods and services – sometimes this can be even 35 times as much. Market stall-holders and individual public transport providers may also insist on higher prices for their goods and services when dealing with foreigners (sometimes called the "White Man Tax"). Some goods – such as housing – may be offered at cheaper prices for certain ethnic groups.

=== Discounts for members of certain occupations ===
Some businesses may offer reduced prices members of some occupations, such as school teachers (see below), police and military personnel. In addition to increased sales to the target group, businesses benefit from the resulting positive publicity, leading to increased sales to the general public. In the United Kingdom, the "Blue Light Card" is an example of a discount scheme available to staff working for emergency services, the NHS, social care providers and the armed forces.

=== Incentives for industrial buyers ===
Many methods exist to incentivize wholesale or industrial buyers. These may be quite targeted, as they are designed to promote specific behaviours such as buying more frequently, buying more regularly, buying in larger quantities, buying new products with established ones, and so on. They may also be designed to reduce the administrative and finance costs of processing each transaction. Thus, there are bulk discounts, special pricing for long-term commitments, non-peak discounts, discounts on high-demand goods to incentivize buying lower-demand goods, rebates, and many others. This can help the relations between the sellers involved. It's the example of the second-price discrimination.

=== Gender-based examples ===
Gender-based price discrimination is the practice of offering identical or similar services and products to men and women at different prices when the cost of producing the products and services is the same. In the United States, gender-based price discrimination has been a source of debate. In 1992, the New York City Department of Consumer Affairs ("DCA") conducted an investigation of "price bias against women in the marketplace". The DCA's investigation concluded that women paid more than men at used car dealers, dry cleaners, and hair salons. The DCA's research on gender pricing in New York City brought national attention to gender-based price discrimination and the financial impact it has on women.

With consumer products, differential pricing is usually not based explicitly on the actual gender of the purchaser, but is achieved implicitly by the use of differential packaging, labelling, or colour schemes designed to appeal to male or female consumers. In many cases, where the product is marketed to make an attractive gift, the gender of the purchaser may be different from that of the end user.

In 1995, California Assembly's Office of Research studied the issue of gender-based price discrimination of services and estimated that women effectively paid an annual "gender tax" of approximately $1,351.00 for the same services as men. It was also estimated that women, over the course of their lives, spend thousands of dollars more than men to purchase similar products. For example, prior to the enactment of the Patient Protection and Affordable Care Act ("Affordable Care Act"), health insurance companies charged women higher premiums for individual health insurance policies than men. Under the Affordable Care Act, health insurance companies are now required to offer the same premium price to all applicants of the same age and geographical locale without regard to gender. However, there is no federal law banning gender-based price discrimination in the sale of products. Instead, several cities and states have passed legislation prohibiting gender-based price discrimination on products and services.

In Europe, motor insurance premiums have historically been higher for men than for women, a practice that the insurance industry attempts to justify on the basis of different levels of risk. The EU has banned this practice; however, there is evidence that it is being replaced by "proxy discrimination", that is, discrimination on the basis of factors that are strongly correlated with gender: for example, charging construction workers more than midwives.

In Chinese retail automobile market, researchers found that male buyers pay less than female buyers for cars with the same characteristics. Although this research documented the existence of price discrimination between locals and non-locals, local men still receive $221.63 discount more than local women and non-local men receive $330.19 discount more than non-local women. The discount represents approximately 10% of average personal budget, considering the per capita GDP for 2018.

=== International price discrimination ===
Pharmaceutical companies may charge customers living in wealthier countries a much higher price than for identical drugs in poorer nations, as is the case with the sale of antiretroviral drugs in Africa. Since the purchasing power of African consumers is much lower, sales would be extremely limited without price discrimination. The ability of pharmaceutical companies to maintain price differences between countries is often either reinforced or hindered by national drugs laws and regulations, or the lack thereof.

Even online sales for non material goods, which do not have to be shipped, may change according to the geographic location of the buyer, such as music streaming services by Spotify and Apple Music. The users in lower-income countries benefit from price discrimination by paying fewer subscription fees than those in higher-income countries. The researchers also found that the cross-national price differences actually raise the revenue of those companies by about 6% while reducing world users' welfare by 1%.

=== Academic pricing ===
Companies will often offer discounted goods and software to students and faculty at school and university levels. These may be labeled as academic versions, but perform the same as the full price retail software. Some academic software may have differing licenses than retail versions, usually disallowing their use in activities for profit or expiring the license after a given number of months. This also has the characteristics of an "initial offer" – that is, the profits from an academic customer may come partly in the form of future non-academic sales due to vendor lock-in.

=== Sliding scale fees ===
Sliding scale fees are when different customers are charged different prices based on their income, which is used as a proxy for their willingness or ability to pay. For example, some nonprofit law sellers charge on a sliding scale based on income and family size. Thus the clients paying a higher price at the top of the fee scale help subsidize the clients at the bottom of the scale. This differential pricing enables the nonprofit to serve a broader segment of the market than they could if they only set one price.

=== Weddings ===
Goods and services for weddings are sometimes priced at a higher rate than identical goods for normal customers. The wedding venues and services are usually priced differently depending on the wedding date. For instance, if the wedding is held during the peak seasons (school holidays or festive seasons), the price will be higher than in the off-season wedding months.

=== Obstetric service ===
The welfare consequences of price discrimination were assessed by testing the differences in mean prices paid by patients from three income groups: low, middle and high. The results suggest that two different forms of price discrimination for obstetric services occurred in both these hospitals. First, there was price discrimination according to income, with the poorer users benefiting from a higher discount rate than richer ones. Secondly, there was price discrimination according to social status, with three high status occupational groups (doctors, senior government officials, and large businessmen) having the highest probability of receiving some level of discount.

=== Pharmaceutical industry ===
Price discrimination is common in the pharmaceutical industry. Drug-makers charge more for drugs in wealthier countries. For example, drug prices in the United States are some of the highest in the world. Europeans, on average, pay only 56% of what Americans pay for the same prescription drugs.

=== Textbooks ===
Price discrimination is also prevalent within the textbook publishing industry. Prices for textbooks are much higher in the United States despite the fact that they are produced in the country. Copyright protection laws increase the price of textbooks. Also, textbooks are mandatory in the United States while schools in other countries see them as study aids.

=== Concession and student discounts ===
Sellers often use third degree price discrimination concession and student segments in the market. By offering a perceived discount to market segments which generally have less disposable income, and hence are more price sensitive, the seller is able to capture the revenue from those with higher price sensitivity whilst also charging higher prices and capturing the consumer surplus of the segments with less price sensitivity.

=== Counterexamples ===
Some pricing patterns appear to be price discrimination but are not.

==== Congestion pricing ====
Price discrimination only happens when the same product is sold at more than one price. Congestion pricing is not price discrimination. Peak and off-peak fares on a train are not the same product; some people have to travel during rush hour, and travelling off-peak is not equivalent to them.

Some companies have high fixed costs (like a train operator, which owns a railway and rolling stock, or a restaurant, which has to pay for premises and equipment). If these fixed costs permit the operator to additionally provide less-preferred products (like mid-morning meals or off-peak rail travel) at little additional cost, it can profit both seller and buyer to offer them at lower prices. Providing more product from the same fixed costs increases both producer and consumer surplus. This is not technically price discrimination (unlike, say, giving menus with higher prices to richer-looking customers, which the poorer-looking ones get an ordinary menu).

If different prices are charged for products that only some consumers will see as equivalent, the differential pricing can be used to manage demand. For instance, airlines can use price discrimination to encourage people to travel at unpopular times (early in the morning). This helps avoid over-crowding and helps to spread out demand. The airline gets better use out of planes and airports, and can thus charge less (or profit more) than if it only flew peak hours.

== See also ==
- Dynamic pricing
- Frugal innovation
- Geo (marketing)
- Interstate Commerce Act of 1887
- Marketing
- Market segmentation
- Microeconomics
- Outline of industrial organization
- Value-based pricing
- Pay what you want
- Pricing strategies
- Ramsey problem
- Redlining
- Resale price maintenance
- Robinson–Patman Act
- Sliding scale fees
- Surveillance pricing
- Ticket resale
- Variable pricing
- Yield management
