= Two-part tariff =

Price discrimination technique

A two-part tariff (TPT) is a form of price discrimination wherein the price of a product or service is composed of two parts – a lump-sum fee as well as a per-unit charge. In general, such a pricing technique only occurs in partially or fully monopolistic markets. It is designed to enable the firm to capture more consumer surplus than it otherwise would in a non-discriminating pricing environment. Two-part tariffs may also exist in competitive markets when consumers are uncertain about their ultimate demand. Health club consumers, for example, may be uncertain about their level of future commitment to an exercise regimen. Two-part tariffs are easy to implement when connection or entrance fees (first part) can be charged along with a price per unit consumed (second part).

Depending on the homogeneity of demand, the lump-sum fee charged varies, but the rational firm will set the per unit charge above or equal to the marginal cost of production, and below or equal to the price the firm would charge in a perfect monopoly. Under competition the per-unit price is set below marginal cost.

An important element to remember concerning two-part tariffs is that the product or service offered by the firm must be identical to all consumers, hence, price charged may vary, but not due to different costs borne by the firm, as this would imply a differentiated product. Thus, while credit cards which charge an annual fee plus a per-transaction fee is a good example of a two-part tariff, a fixed fee charged by a car rental company in addition to a per-kilometer fuel fee is not so good, because the fixed fee may reflect fixed costs such as registration and insurance which the firm must recoup in this manner. This can make the identification of two-part tariffs difficult.

== A two-part tariff when consumer demand is homogeneous ==
A demonstration of a two-part tariff when demand is homogeneous; the diagram applies for each consumer

When consumers have homogeneous demand, any one consumer is representative of the market (the market being n identical consumers). For purposes of demonstration, consider just one consumer who interacts with one firm which experiences fixed costs and constant costs per unit - hence the horizontal marginal cost (MC) line.

Recall that the demand curve represents our consumer's maximum willingness to pay for any given output. Thus, as long as he receives an appropriate amount of goods, such as Qc, then he will be willing to pay his entire surplus (ABC) in addition to the cost per unit under perfect competition (Pc by Qc) - i.e. the entire area under the demand curve up to point Qc.

If the firm is perfectly competitive, it would charge price Pc and supply Qc to our consumer, making no economic profit but producing an allocatively efficient output. If the firm is a non-price discriminating monopolist, it would charge price Pm per unit and supply Qm, maximizing profit but producing below the allocatively efficient level of output Qc. This situation yields economic profit for the firm equal to the green area B, consumer surplus equal to the light blue area A, and a deadweight loss equal to the purple area C.

If the firm is a price discriminating monopolist, then it has the capacity to extract more resources from the consumer. It charges a lump sum fee, as well as a per-unit cost. In order to sell the maximum number of units, the firm must charge the perfectly competitive price per unit, Pc, because this is the only price at which Qc units can be sold (note this is also the marginal cost per unit). To make up for the lower cost per unit, the firm then imposes a fee upon our consumer equal to his consumer surplus, ABC.

The lump-sum fee enables the firm to capture all the consumer surplus and deadweight loss areas, resulting in higher profit than a non-price discriminating monopolist could manage. The result is a firm which is in a sense allocatively efficient (price per unit is equal to marginal cost, but total price is not) - one of the redeeming qualities of price discrimination. If there are multiple consumers with homogeneous demand, then profit will equal n times the area ABC, where n is the number of consumers.

== A two-part tariff when consumer demand is different ==
A demonstration of a two-part tariff when demand is different

We now consider the case where there are two consumers, X and Y. Consumer Y's demand is exactly twice consumer X's demand, and each of these consumers is represented by a separate demand curve, and their combined demand (Dmarket). The firm is the same as in the previous example. We assume that the firm cannot separately identify each consumer - it cannot therefore price discriminate against each of them individually.

The firm would like to follow the same logic as before and charge a per-unit price of Pc while imposing a lump-sum fee equal to area ABCD - the largest consumer surplus of the two consumers. In so doing, however, the firm will be pricing consumer X out of the market, because the lump-sum fee far exceeds his own consumer surplus of area AC. Nevertheless, this would still yield profit equal ABCD from consumer Y.

A solution to pricing consumer X out of the market is to instead charge a lump-sum fee equal to area AC, and continue to charge Pc per unit. Profit in this instance equals twice the area AC (two consumers): 2 x AC. As it turns out, since consumer Y's demand is twice consumer X's, ABCD = 2 x AC. The profit is the same and the producer is indifferent to either of these pricing possibilities, although consumer Y is better off this way since she gets consumer surplus BD.

However, it is possible for the firm to earn even greater profits. Assume it sets the unit price equal to Pm, and imposes a lump-sum fee equal to area A. Both consumers again remain in the market, except now the firm is making a profit on each unit sold - total market profit from the sale of Qm units at price Pm is equal to area CDE. Profit from the lump-sum fee is 2 x A = AB. Total profit is therefore area ABCDE.

Thus, by charging a higher per unit price and a lower lump-sum fee, the firm has generated area E more profit than if it had charged a lower per-unit price and a higher lump-sum fee. Note that the firm is no longer producing the allocatively efficient output, and there is a deadweight loss experienced by society equal to area F - this is a result of the exercise of monopoly power.

Consumer X is left with no consumer surplus, while Consumer Y is left with area B.

== Examples ==
The following items could be identified as two part tariffs; but it is possible that some of them could be debated on the basis of the presence of fixed costs such as insurance which the firm cannot recoup in any other way.

- "membership discount retailers" such as shopping clubs that charge an annual fee for admission to the point of sale and also charge for your purchases
- amusement parks where there are admission fees and also per-ride fees
- cover charge for bars combined with per drink fees
- credit cards which charge an annual fee plus a per-transaction fee
- loyalty cards or clubs
- landline telephones where there is a fee to use the service ('line rental') and also a fee per call. The line rental covers the cost of providing the service, the per minute charge covers the cost of placing the call on the network.
- personal seat licenses in professional sports, in which fans of a team pay an up-front lump sum fee for the right to purchase tickets at face value
- pay for play games

== See also ==
- Microeconomics
- Pricing
- Price discrimination
