= Sliding scale fees =

Price variability

Sliding scale fees are variable prices for products, services, or taxes based on a customer's ability to pay. Such fees are thereby reduced for those who have lower incomes, or alternatively, less money to spare after their personal expenses, regardless of income. Sliding scale fees are a form of price discrimination or differential pricing.

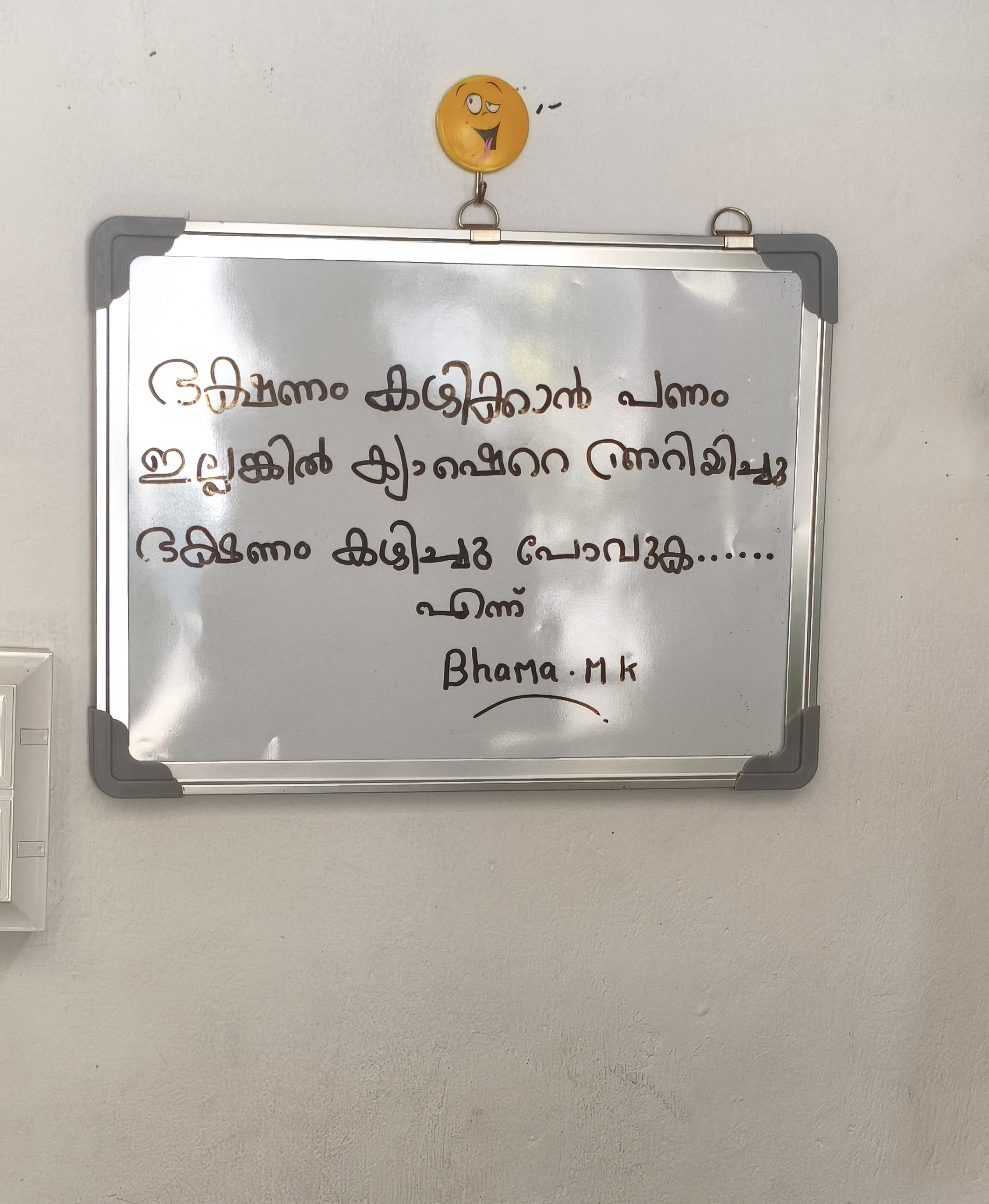
Note at a Restaurant, Offering free meals to those who cannot afford to pay, from Kottayam, Keralam

A business or organization may have various motivations for pricing a product or service on a sliding scale. These may include the desire to be charitable to those less able to afford the product or service, their ability to get a tax deduction for offering their services as charity, their ability to benefit from the revenue even from a partial payment, their retention of a longtime customer/client, or referrals that such a customer/client may provide.

For example, healthcare providers sometimes offer a sliding scale of fees to patients. Some child-adoption agencies collect legal fees (normally very expensive) on a sliding scale, so that couples across a wider range of incomes are able to adopt children. Sliding-scale fees are also often charged by lawyers, places of worship, and for tuition at educational institutions.

== See also ==
- Pay what you want
- Price discrimination
- Sliding wage scale
- Progressive tax
