= Market domination =

Measure of the strength of a brand, product, service or firm

Market dominance is the control of an economic market by a firm. A dominant firm possesses the power to affect competition and influence market price. A firm's dominance is a measure of the power of a brand, product, service, or firm, relative to competitive offerings, whereby a dominant firm can behave independent of their competitors or consumers, and without concern for resource allocation. Dominant positioning is both a legal concept and an economic concept and the distinction between the two is important when determining whether a firm's market position is dominant.

Although market dominance itself is legal, abuse of market dominance is an anti-competitive practice.

== Sources of market dominance ==
Firms can achieve dominance in their industry through multiple means, such as;

- First-mover advantage,
- Innovation,
- Brand equity, and
- Economies of scale.

=== First-mover advantages ===
Many dominant firms are the first "important" competitor in their industry. These firms can achieve short- or long-term advantages over their competitors when they are the first offering in a new industry. First-movers can set a benchmark for competitors and consumers regarding expectations of product and service offering, technology, convenience, quality, or price. These firms are representative of their industry and their brand can become synonymous with the product category itself, such as the company Band-Aid. First-mover advantage is a limited source of market dominance if a firm becomes complacent or fails to keep up innovation by competitors.

=== Innovation ===
It is recognised that firms who place greater importance on product innovation often have an advantage over firms who do not. The significant links to Game theory have are apparent, and in conjunction with empirical evidence, research has attempted to explain whether more dominant firms or less dominant firms innovate more.

=== Brand Equity ===
Referring to the value that branding adds over a generic equivalent, Brand Equity can contribute to gains in market dominance for firms who choose to capitalise on its worth, whether through charging a price premium or other business strategy.

=== Economies of Scale ===
As firms expand, production becomes more efficient and costs lower. It has been shown in empirically several times that there is a clear link between profitability and market share, and thus market dominance. The explicit relationship between economies of scale and market shares has also been explored.

== Measuring market dominance ==
Identifying a dominant position involves the use of several factors. The European Commission's Guidance on A102 states that a dominant position is derived from a combination of factors, which taken separately are not determinative. Therefore, it is necessary to consider the constraints imposed by existing supplies from, and the position of, actual competitors, meaning those who are competing with the undertaking in question. This involves looking at the day-to-day downwards pressure that retains low product prices and competitiveness within the market, which market shares are only useful as a first indication of; this needs to be followed by the consideration of other factors such as market conditions and dynamics.

=== Market share ===
There is often a geographic element to the competitive landscape. In defining market dominance, one must see to what extent a product, brand, or firm controls a product category in a given geographic area. There are several ways of measuring market dominance. The most direct is market share. This is the percentage of the total market served by a firm or brand. A declining scale of market shares is common in most industries: that is, if the industry leader has say 50% share, the next largest might have 25% share, the next 12% share, the next 6% share, and all remaining firms combined might have 7% share.

Market share is not a perfect proxy of market dominance. Although there are no hard and fast rules governing the relationship between market share and market dominance, the following are general criteria:

- A company, brand, product, or service that has a combined market share exceeding 60% most probably has market power and market dominance.
- A market share of over 35% but less than 60%, held by one brand, product or service, is an indicator of market strength but not necessarily dominance.
- A market share of less than 35%, held by one brand, product or service, is not an indicator of strength or dominance and will not raise anti-competitive concerns by government regulators.

Market shares within an industry might not exhibit a declining scale. There could be only two firms in a duopolistic market, each with 50% share; or there could be three firms in the industry each with 33% share; or 100 firms each with 1% share. The concentration ratio of an industry is used as an indicator of the relative size of leading firms in relation to the industry as a whole. One commonly used concentration ratio is the four-firm concentration ratio, which consists of the combined market share of the four largest firms, as a percentage, in the total industry. The higher the concentration ratio, the greater the market power of the leading firms.

Legally, the determination is often more complex. A case that can be used to define market dominance under EU Law is the United Brands v Commission (The ‘bananas’ case) where the court of justice said, 'the dominant position thus referred to by Article [102] relates to a position of economic strength enjoyed by an undertaking which enables it to prevent effective competition being maintained on the relevant market by affording it the power to behave to an appreciable extent independently of its competitors, customers and ultimately of its consumers’ The commission's Guidance suggests that market shares is only a ‘useful first indication’ in the process of assessing market power.

==== Market dominance and monopolies ====
Market dominance is closely related to the economic concept of competition. Monopolistic power is derived from market share, and thus intertwined with dominance. Whilst a theoretical monopoly will have a single firm supplying the industry, market dominance can describe a situation where multiple firms operate in the market, however a single firm has majority control.

As economic competition is encouraged, regulation in most countries applies to both monopolistic firms, as well as firms who hold dominant market positions. In Australia, for example, the Australian Competition & Consumer Commission hold the position that a firm with significant market power (relating to dominant firms, all the way up to firms in a complete monopoly) must not "do anything that has the purpose, effect or likely effect of substantially lessening competition."

Relevance of market shares

According to the European Commission, market shares provide a useful first indication of the structure of any market and of the relative importance of the various undertakings active on it. In paragraph 15 of the Guidance on A102, the European Commission state that a high market share over a long period of time can be a preliminary indication of dominance. The International Competition Network stress that determining whether substantial market power is apparent should not be based on market shares alone, but instead an analysis of all factors affecting the competitive conditions in the market, should be used.

100% market shares are very rare but can arise in niche areas, a close example of this being 91.8% market share in Tetra Pak 1 (BTG Licence), and the 96% market share in plasterboard held by BPB in BPB Industries Plc v Commission OJ.

In Hoffman-La Roche v Commission, the Court of Justice said that large market shares are ‘evidence of the existence of a dominant position’ which led to the Court of Justice decision in AKZO v Commission that where there is market share of at least 50%, without exceptional circumstances, there will be a presumption of dominance that shifts the burden of proof on to the undertaking. The European Commission has affirmed this threshold in cases since AKZO. For example, in paragraph 100 of the Commission Judgment in the Court of First Instance in France Telecom v Commission, the Commission state that ‘…very large shares are in themselves, and save in exceptional circumstances, evidence of the existence of a dominant position…’, citing the Court of Justice judgement in AZKO, paragraph 60, ‘…this was so in the case of a 50% market share.’.

European Commission's Tenth Report on Competition implies that a significant disparity between the largest and the second-largest firm shares can indicate that the largest firm has a dominant position in the market. Specifically, under a section entitled "Scrutiny of mergers for compatibility with Article 86 EEC," the Report states:

A dominant position can generally be said to exist once a market share to the order of 40% to 45% is reached. [footnote: A dominant position cannot even be ruled out in respect of market shares between 20% and 40%; Ninth Report on Competition Policy, point 22.] Although this share does not in itself automatically give control of the market, if there are large gaps between the position of the firm concerned and those of its closest competitors and also other factors likely to place it at an advantage as regards competition, a dominant position may well exist. (European Commission's Tenth Report on Competition, page 103, paragraph 150.)

=== Impact on competitors ===
Another way of calculating market dominance, by looking at competition as market shares, are even less useful when assessing the competitive pressure that is exerted on an undertaking – i.e. the competition that would come from other firms that are not yet operating on the market but have the capacity to enter it in the near future. Of particular importance here are paragraphs 16 and 17 of the commission's Guidance...16. Competition is a dynamic process and an assessment of the competitive constraints on an undertaking cannot be based solely on the existing market situation. The potential impact of expansion by actual competitors or entry by potential competitors, including the threat of such expansion or entry, is also relevant. An undertaking can be deterred from increasing prices if expansion or entry is likely, timely and sufficient. For the commission to consider expansion or entry likely it must be sufficiently profitable for the competitor or entrant, taking into account factors such as the barriers to expansion or entry, the likely reactions of the allegedly dominant undertaking and other competitors, and the risks and costs of failure.

The Guidance also states that the constraints imposed by the credible threat of future expansion by actual competitors, or entry by potential competitors, is a required factor of consideration. For example, Intellectual Property in the form of patent protection, is a potential legal barrier to entering the market for new businesses, as was shown in Microsoft Corp. In this case, the Court of Justice confirmed the commission's decision, that Microsoft were dominant and had abused their dominant position regarding their refusal to supply the interoperability information for operating PC Windows with other systems. Microsoft was forced to license out its interoperability data.

=== Herfindahl–Hirschman index ===
There is also the Herfindahl–Hirschman index. It is a measure of the size of firms in relation to the industry and an indicator of the amount of competition among them. It is defined as the sum of the squares of the market shares of each individual firm. As such, it can range from 0 to 10,000, moving from a very large amount of very small firms to a single monopolistic producer. Decreases in the Herfindahl–Hirschman index generally indicate a loss of pricing power and an increase in competition, whereas increases imply the opposite.

=== Kwoka's dominance index ===
Kwoka's dominance index ($\text{D}$) is defined as the sum of the squared differences between each firm's share and the next largest share in a market:

$$\text{D} = \sum_{i=1}^{n-1} (s_i-s_{i+1})^2$$

where

$s_1 \ge ... \ge s_i \ge s_{i+1} \ge ... \ge s_n$ for all $i = 1, ..., n - 1$.

=== Other measures of market dominance ===
As part of its merger review process, Mexican Competition Commission uses García Alba's dominance index ($\text{ID}$), described as the Herfindahl–Hirschman index of a Herfindahl–Hirschman index ($\text{HHI}$). Formally, $\text{ID}$ is the sum of squared firm contributions to the market $\text{HHI}$: $\text{ID} = \sum_{i=1}^n h_i^2$ where $h_i = \frac{s_i^2}{\text{HHI}}.$Asymmetry Index ($\text{AI}$) is defined as the statistical variance of market shares: $\text{AI}=\frac{\sum_{i=1}^n \left(s_i- {\frac{1}{n}}\right)^2}{n}.$

=== Customer power ===
Countervailing Buyer Power is something else that should be considered when calculating market dominance. In market where the buyers have more power than suppliers in determining prices or changes in the market a firm of high market share may not exercise its powers against competitors easily as it always has to be accountable to customers that give it its high market share and are not hesitant to switch product preference to the next firm. Such customers will need to have sufficient bargaining strength which will normally come from its size or its commercial significance in the industry sector.

The final point that must be considered is the bargaining strength of the undertaking's customers, also known as the countervailing buyer power. This refers to the competitive constraints that customers may exert where they are a large size, or commercially significant, for a dominant firm. However, the commission will not come to a final decision without examining all of the factors which may be relevant to constrain the behavior of the undertaking.

Previous findings of dominance can not be used to calculate dominance as agreed in the Coca-Cola v Commission [2000] case where it was Court held that the Commission must take a fresh approach to the market conditions each time it adopts a decision in relation to Art 102.

== Legal definition ==
There are different perspectives of what indicates dominance and how to go about establishing dominance. One of these being the perspective of the European Commission regarding their application of Article 102 of the Treaty on the Functioning of the European Union (Formerly Article 82 of the Treaty establishing the European Community), that deals specifically with the abuse of dominance in the market regarding competition law.

The European Commission equates dominance with the economic concept of substantial market power, which indicates that dominance can be exerted and abused, in its Guidance on A102 Enforcement Priorities. In paragraph 10 of the Guidance, it is stated that where there is no competitive pressure, an undertaking, which is a legal entity acting in the course of business, is probably able to exercise substantial market power. Furthermore, in paragraph 11, this is developed on, arguing if an undertaking can increase their products above the competitive price level, and does not face economic restraints, it is therefore dominant. For example, in basic terms, if two businesses are selling competing products, and one can increase their selling price, and not suffer an economic consequence such as a boycott of their products or a shift of their customers to a cheaper product, they are dominant.

The Guidance is not law, it is instead a set of rules the courts are to follow. However, the same definition can be found elsewhere, in Chapter 3 of the Unilateral Conduct Workbook. The Guidance is also supported by paragraph 65 of the commission's judgement in United Brands v Commission.

“65THE DOMINANT POSITION REFERRED TO IN THIS ARTICLE (102) RELATES TO A POSITION OF ECONOMIC STRENGTH ENJOYED BY AN UNDERTAKING WHICH ENABLES IT TO PREVENT EFFECTIVE COMPETITION BEING MAINTAINED ON THE RELEVANT MARKET BY GIVING IT THE POWER TO BEHAVE TO AN APPRECIABLE EXTENT INDEPENDENTLY OF ITS COMPETITORS, CUSTOMERS AND ULTIMATELY OF ITS CONSUMERS."

The identification of the relevant and geographic market must first be established before being able to calculate shares or an undertaking’s dominance within that market. Dominance as an economic concept is determined within EU competition law through a 2-stage process, which first requires the identification of the relevant market as was established in Continental Can v Commission. This was affirmed in paragraph 30 of the judgement of AstraZeneca AB v Commission, in which the Commission stated that it must be assessed whether an undertaking is able to act independently of its competitors, customers and consumers.

The identification of the relevant and geographic market is assessed through the hypothetical monopolist test, which questions would a party's customer, switch to an alternative supplier located elsewhere, in response to a small relative price increase. Therefore, it is a question of interchangeability and demand substitutability, meaning whether one product can be a substitute for another, and whether an undertaking's market power puts them above price competition. The second stage of the test requires the commission to look at various factors to see if an undertaking enjoys a dominant position on that relevant market.

== Market dominance attractiveness ==
Why firms want a greater market share is a logical concept with both empirical and theoretical foundations. One of the main driving principles is a firm's profit motive, dealing specifically with why firms choose to maximize their profits. As research links market share to return on investment, it is expected that firms will choose to follow strategies which lead to increasing market share and a more dominant position in the market.

== See also ==
- Early adopter
- Market power
- Competition law
- First-mover advantage
