= Lerner index =

Measure of firm's market power

The Lerner index, formalized in 1934 by British economist of Russian origin Abba Lerner, is a measure of a firm's market power.

== Definition ==
The Lerner index is defined by:

$L=\frac{P-MC}{P}$

where P is the market price set by the firm and MC is the firm's marginal cost. The index ranges from 0 to 1. A perfectly competitive firm charges P = MC, L = 0; such a firm has no market power. An oligopolist or monopolist charges P > MC, so its index is L > 0, but the extent of its markup depends on the elasticity (the price-sensitivity) of demand and strategic interaction with competing firms. The index rises to 1 if the firm has MC = 0.

The following factors affect the value of the Lerner index:

- the price elasticity of demand for goods produced by the company — the smaller the fluctuations in demand under the influence of prices, the smaller the elasticity and the greater the value of L;
- the interaction with competitors — the more of them and the larger their size, the less the company's ability to maximize profits and the smaller the L;
- the degree of regulation — the more actively the state conducts an antitrust policy, the lower the value of L.

The Lerner Rule or Lerner Condition is that if a firm with enough market power (e.g. a monopolist) maximizes profits then it will choose its price and production so that the Lerner Index is the negative reciprocal of the elasticity of demand facing the firm (note that this is not necessarily the same as the market elasticity of demand):

$\frac{P-MC}{P} = -\frac{1}{E_d}$	1

A drawback of the Lerner Index is that while it is relatively easy to observe a firm's prices, it is quite difficult to measure its marginal costs. In practice, the average cost is often used as an approximation.

The Lerner index can never be greater than one. As a result, if the firm is maximizing profit, the elasticity of demand facing it can never be less than one in magnitude ($|E|<1$). If it were, the firm could increase its profits by raising its price, because inelastic demand means that a price increase of 1% would reduce quantity by less than 1%, so revenue would rise, and since lower quantity means lower costs, profits would rise. Put another way, a monopolist never operates along the inelastic part of its demand curve.

=== Market power and profit ===
Market power alone does not guarantee high profits, since profits depend on the ratio of average costs to price. A firm may have more market power than another firm, but still make less profit. As an example, let's compare an average supermarket and a convenience store operating in the same area. In supermarkets, the margin is usually 15-20%, and in convenience stores 25-30 %. This is due to the fact that supermarkets operate in a more competitive environment — during their operation, other outlets are also working at the same time to ensure a significant number of customers, it is necessary to offer attractive prices. Convenience stores charge a higher price than supermarkets because some of their customers fall at a time when there is not a large selection of outlets or for the sake of a minor purchase, it makes no sense to look for other options. The number of visitors to such stores is generally less dependent on prices than in supermarkets (less elastic demand). According to the Lerner coefficient, small stores have more monopoly power because they charge higher margins on the same product. But at the same time, such stores usually receive a much smaller amount of profit than a supermarket, since they have a much smaller sales amount, and the average unit cost is higher.

== Derivation ==
The Lerner Rule comes from the firm's profit maximization problem. A firm choosing quantity $Q$ facing inverse demand curve $P(Q)$ and incurring costs $C(Q)$ has profit equal to revenue (where $R = PQ$) minus costs:

$$\text{Profit} = R(Q) - C(Q) = P(Q) Q - C(Q)$$

Under suitable conditions (namely that this is a convex maximization problem, e.g. when $P(Q)$ and $C(Q)$ are linear), we can find the maximum by taking the derivative of profit with respect to $Q$, giving us the first-order-condition for maximum profit:

$\frac{\partial R}{\partial Q} = \frac{\partial C}{\partial Q}$	2

which gives the standard condition that at the profit maximum, the marginal revenue is equal to the marginal cost (that is, the marginal profit is 0).

The derivative of the revenue can be found using the product rule:

$\frac{\partial R}{\partial Q} = P + \frac{\partial P}{\partial Q} Q$	3

The elasticity of demand is defined as the fractional change in the quantity demanded given a fractional change in price (often expressed as a percentage) $E_d = \frac{\partial Q / Q}{\partial P / P} = \frac{\partial Q}{\partial P}\frac{P}{Q}$

Thus,

$$\frac{1}{E_d} = \frac{\partial P}{\partial Q} \frac{Q}{P}$$

so that

$$\frac{P}{E_d} = \frac{\partial P}{\partial Q} Q$$

Substituting into the marginal revenue equation (3) gives us the Amoroso-Robinson relation:

$$\frac{\partial R}{\partial Q} = P + \frac{P}{E_d} = P \left ( 1 + \frac{1}{E_D} \right )$$

Substituting this relation into the profit maximization condition (2) gives us (where $MC$ is the marginal cost $\tfrac{\partial C}{\partial Q}$)

$$P + \frac{P}{E_D} = MC$$
$$P - MC = - \frac{P}{E_D}$$

Dividing by $P$ gives us the Lerner Rule (1)

$$\frac{P - MC}{P} = - \frac{1}{E_D}$$

== Examples ==
=== Calculation ===
Let's suppose we need to fill in the gaps in the following table:

Industry	Price,P	Marginal cost,MC	Elasticity of demand,E_{d}	Lerner index,L
A	10			0.4
B	30		-2	
C	40	30		

For L = -1/E_{d} and E_{d} = -1/L, the elasticity of demand for industry A will be -2.5. We can use the value of the Lerner index to calculate the marginal cost (MC) of a firm as follows:
0.4 = (10 – MC) ÷ 10 ⇒ MC = 10 − 4 = 6.
The missing values for industry B are found as follows: from the E_{d} value of -2, we find that the Lerner index is 0.5. If the price is 30 and L is 0.5, then MC will be 15:
MC = P − P × L = 30 — 30 × 0,5 = 15.
Industry C. For P=40 and MC=30, the Lerner index will be equal to 0.25 [= (40 − 30) ÷ 40], and the value of E_{d} should be -4 [= -1 ÷ 0.25]. Based on the results of the calculations, our table will take the final form:

Industry	Price,P	Marginal cost,MC	Elasticity of demand,E_{d}	Lerner index,L
A	10	6	-2.5	0.4
B	30	15	-2	0.5
C	40	30	-4	0.25

Thus, industry B has the greatest monopoly power, and industry С is the closest to perfect competition.

=== Lerner index of the Czech credit market ===
Lerner index of the Czech credit market
Year	Mean	Median
2000	0.4438	0.5486
2001	0.5598	0.5455
2002	0.5723	0.5530
2003	0.6165	0.6089
2004	0.5430	0.5371
2005	0.5980	0.6163
2006	0.5673	0.5457
2007	0.5650	0.5739
2008	0.5109	0.5029
2009	0.3921	0.3289
2010	0.6742	0.6582

During the period 2000–2005 the Lerner index computed for the credit market slightly increased. It means that there was a slight decrease in competition. Then, during 2006–2009, there was a decrease in the Lernex index. In 2010 the Lerner index significantly increased. The mean of the Lerner index computed for the full sample is 53.58 %, which do not confirm either monopoly or perfect competition in the credit market of Czech Republic.

=== Lerner index of the Czech deposit market ===
Lerner index of the Czech deposit market
Year	Mean	Median
2000	0.5905	0.6898
2001	0.6864	0.6959
2002	0.6930	0.6692
2003	0.7170	0.7204
2004	0.6595	0.6482
2005	0.6955	0.7100
2006	0.6718	0.6806
2007	0.6696	0.6776
2008	0.6255	0.6328
2009	0.5266	0.4880
2010	0.7642	0.7355

This table represents the estimation of the market power in the deposit market in Czech Republic. During the period 2005–2009 the Lerner index computed for the deposit market slightly decrease, which means a slight increase in competition. In 2010, there was an increase in the Lerner index. It signals a decrease in competition. However, the value of Lerner index haven't changed significantly in estimated 10 years.

=== Lerner index in the lending market of Russia ===
In 2015, the article "Application of the Lerner index to the assessment of competition in small and medium-sized business in lending market of Russia" was published. They analyzed the period from 2010 to 2013. The objectives of this work were to assess the degree of competition in the segment of lending to small and medium-sized businesses, as well as to analyze the market power of various groups of commercial banks. As a research method, the Lerner index was chosen to determine which of the groups of banks (small, medium and large; partners and non-partners of various development banks) have higher market power and how it changes over time. This work made a significant contribution to the study of banking competition, adapting the indicator for assessing the competition of the entire banking services market to the assessment of the degree of competition in the market of a single product - lending to small and medium-sized businesses, as well as showing the presence of competition.

Descriptive statistics of the Lerner Index for the banking system
Year	Value	Standard deviation
2010	0,3159	0,1274
2011	0,2137	0,1337
2012	0,2285	0,1341
2013	0,3027	0,1405

The results of the study showed that the segment of lending to small and medium-sized businesses by structure is a monopolistic competition, the dominant position in which is occupied by state-owned banks. The monopoly power of this group is due to their use of economies of scale, the low cost of funding, and the lower risks of loans issued. The effect of supporting the development banks of small and medium-sized banks is not significantly reflected in their market power.

== See also ==
- Ramsey problem
- Amoroso–Robinson relation
- Herfindahl Index
- Market segmentation index
