= Orris C. Herfindahl =

American economist

Orris Clemens Herfindahl (June 15, 1918 in Parshall, North Dakota - December 16, 1972 while traveling in Nepal) was an economist who studied natural resources. However, he is mainly known as the inventor of a concentration index (the Herfindahl index) which he proposed in his 1950 doctoral dissertation on the steel industry while at Columbia University. In fact a similar index (with the addition of a square root) was proposed earlier (in 1945) by Albert O. Hirschman. Thus, it is usually referred to as the Herfindahl-Hirschman Index.

== Publications ==
- Economic theory of natural resources
- Natural Resources Information for Economic Development
- Copper Costs and Prices: 1870-1957 - study of copper, sometimes seen as a bellwether of global activity.
