= Herfindahl–Hirschman index =

Measure of the relative size of firms

The Herfindahl index (also known as Herfindahl–Hirschman Index, HHI, or sometimes HHI-score) is a measure of the size of firms in relation to the industry they are in and is an indicator of the amount of competition among them. Named after economists Orris C. Herfindahl and Albert O. Hirschman, it is an economic concept widely applied in competition law, antitrust regulation, and technology management. HHI has continued to be used by antitrust authorities, primarily to evaluate and understand how mergers will affect their associated markets.

HHI is calculated by squaring the market share of each competing firm in the industry and then summing the resulting numbers (sometimes limited to the 50 largest firms). The result is proportional to the average market share, weighted by market share. As such, it can range from 0 to 1.0, moving from a huge number of very small firms to a single monopolistic producer. Increases in the HHI generally indicate a decrease in competition and an increase of market power, whereas decreases indicate the opposite. Alternatively, the index can be expressed per 10,000 "points". For example, an index of .25 is the same as 2,500 points.

The major benefit of the Herfindahl index in relation to measures such as the concentration ratio is that the HHI gives more weight to larger firms. Other advantages of the HHI include its simple calculation method and the small amount of often easily obtainable data required for the calculation.

The HHI has the same formula as the Simpson diversity index, which is a diversity index used in ecology; the inverse participation ratio (IPR) in physics; and the inverse of the effective number of parties index in political science.

== Example ==
Consider an example of 3 firms before and after a merger, with the top 2 firms producing 40% of goods each, and the other firm producing 20%.

Prior to Merger: $0.4^2+0.4^2+0.2^2=0.36=36\%$

Now consider the top 2 firms merging.

Post Merger: $(0.4 + 0.4)^2+0.2^2=0.68=68\%$

As can be seen prior to the merger, the HHI, while not low, is in a range that allows for strong competition. However, post merger the HHI reaches 68%, approaching a HHI consistent with monopolies. This high HHI would lead to weak competition.

This demonstrates how the HHI enables antitrust authorities to understand the impact that mergers have on the market.

The index involves taking the market share of the respective market competitors, squaring it, and adding them together (e.g. in the market for X, company A has 30%, B, C, D, E and F have 10% each and G through to Z have 1% each). When calculating HHI the post merger level of the HHI score and the total increase of the HHI score are considered when reviewing the outcome. If the resulting figure is above a certain threshold then economists will consider the market to have a high concentration (e.g. market X's concentration is 0.142 or 14.2%). This threshold is considered to be 0.25 in the U.S., while the EU prefers to focus on the level of change, for instance that concern is raised if there is a 0.025 change when the index already shows a concentration of 0.1. So to take the example, if in market X company B (with 10% market share) suddenly bought out the shares of company C (with 10% also) then this new market concentration would make the index jump to 0.162. Here it can be seen that it would not be relevant for merger law in the U.S. (being under 0.18) or in the EU (because there is not a change over 0.025).

== Formula ==
$$HHI =\sum_{i=1}^N (MS_i)^2$$
where $MS_i$ is the market share of firm $i$ in the market, and $N$ is the number of firms. Therefore, in a market with 5 firms each producing 20%, the HHI would be $0.2^2 + 0.2^2 + 0.2^2 + 0.2^2 + 0.2^2= 0.20$.

The Herfindahl Index (HHI) ranges from 1/N (in case of perfect competition) to 1 (in case of monopoly), where N is the number of firms in the market. Equivalently, if percents are used as whole numbers, as in 75 instead of 0.75, the index can range up to 100^{2}, or 10,000.

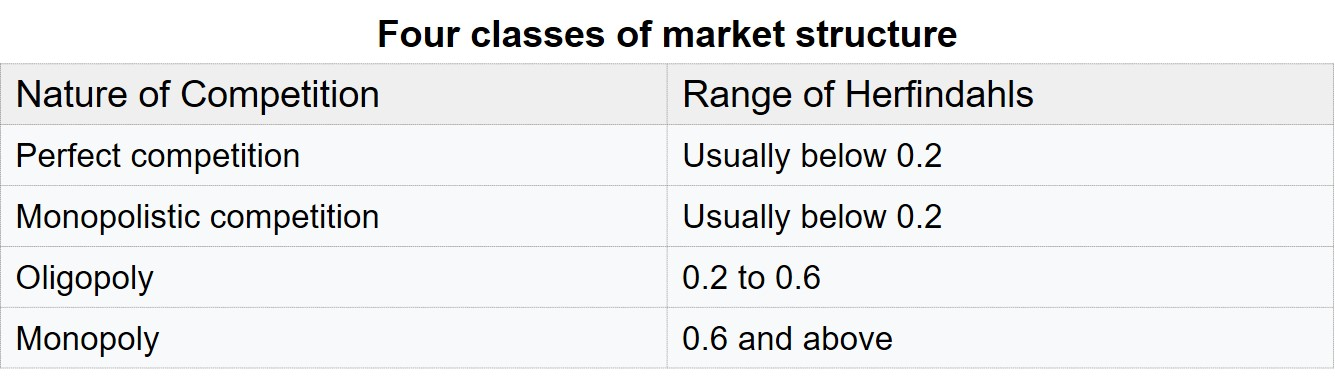
Herfindahl-Hirschman Index

An HHI below 0.01 (or 100) indicates a highly competitive industry, Mergers and acquisitions with an increase of 100 points or less will usually not have any anti competitive effects and will require no further analysis.
An HHI below 0.15 (or 1,500) indicates an unconcentrated industry. Mergers and acquisitions between 100 and 1500 points are unlikely to have anti-competitive effects and will most likely not need further analysis.
An HHI between 0.15 and 0.25 (or 1,500 to 2,500) indicates moderate concentration. Mergers and acquisitions that result in moderate market concentration from HHI increases will raise anti-competitive concerns and will require further analysis.
An HHI above 0.25 (above 2,500) indicates high concentration. Mergers and acquisitions with HHI scores of 2,500 or above will be considered anti competitive and an in-depth analysis produced, if the scores are well above 2,500 they are considered to enhance market power they may only be allowed to progress when significant evidence is shown that the merger or acquisition will not increase market power.

A small index indicates a competitive industry with no dominant players. If all firms have an equal share the reciprocal of the index shows the number of firms in the industry. When firms have unequal shares, the reciprocal of the index indicates the "equivalent" number of firms in the industry. Using case 2, we find that the market structure is equivalent to having 1.55521 firms of the same size.

There is also a normalized Herfindahl index. Whereas the Herfindahl index ranges from 1/N to one, the normalized Herfindahl index ranges from 0 to 1. It is computed as:

- $HHI^* = {\cfrac{\left ( HHI - \dfrac{1}{N} \right )} {1-\dfrac{1}{N}} }$ for N > 1 and
- $HHI^* = 1$ for N = 1

where again, N is the number of firms in the market, and HHI is the usual Herfindahl Index, as above.

Using the normalized Herfindahl index, information about the total number of players (N) is lost, as shown in the following example:

Assume a market with two players and equally distributed market share; $H=\dfrac{1}{N}=\dfrac{1}{2}=0.5$ and $H^*=0$. Now compare that to a situation with three players and again an equally distributed market share; $H=\dfrac{1}{N}=\frac{1}{3}\approx 0.\overline{333}$, note that $H^*=0$ like the situation with two players. The market with three players is less concentrated, but this is not obvious looking at just H*. Thus, the normalized Herfindahl index can serve as a measure for the equality of distributions, but is less suitable for concentration.

== Problems ==
The usefulness of this statistic to detect monopoly formation is directly dependent on a proper definition of a particular market (which hinges primarily on the notion of substitutability). The index fails to take into consideration the complex nature of the market being tested.

- For example, if the statistic were to look at a hypothetical financial services industry as a whole, and found that it contained 6 main firms with 15% market share apiece, then the industry would look non-monopolistic. However, suppose one of those firms handles 90% of the checking and savings accounts and physical branches (and overcharges for them because of its monopoly), and the others primarily do commercial banking and investments. In this scenario, the index hints at dominance by one firm. The market is not properly defined because checking accounts are not substitutable with commercial and investment banking. The problems of defining a market work the other way as well. To take another example, one cinema may have 90% of the movie market, but if movie theaters compete against video stores, pubs and nightclubs then people are less likely to be suffering due to market dominance.
- Another typical problem in defining the market is choosing a geographic scope. For example, firms may have 20% market share each, but may occupy five areas of the country in which they are monopoly providers and thus do not compete against each other. A service provider or manufacturer in one city is not necessarily substitutable with a service provider or manufacturer in another city, depending on the importance of being local for the business—for example, telemarketing services are rather global in scope, while shoe repair services are local.

The United States federal anti-trust authorities such as the Department of Justice and the Federal Trade Commission use the Herfindahl index as a screening tool to determine whether a proposed merger or acquisition is likely to raise antitrust concerns. Increases of over 0.01 (100) generally provoke scrutiny, although this varies from case to case. The Antitrust Division of the Department of Justice considers Herfindahl indices between 0.15 (1,500) and 0.25 (2,500) to be "moderately concentrated" and indices above 0.25 to be "highly concentrated". However, these indices scores are not rigid guidelines that must be followed, while high levels of concentration is concerning, they indices scores provide ways to identify which mergers and acquisitions are potentially noncompetitive. There are other factors that need to be considered that will either help reinforce or counter the harmful effects of higher market concentration. The Herfindahl-Hirschman index is used as a starting point to gauge initial market power and then determine if additional information is needed to conduct further analysis on any potential anti-competitive concerns.

== Intuition ==
When all the firms in an industry have equal market shares, $H = N\left( \dfrac{1}{N} \right)^2 = \dfrac{1}{N}$. The Herfindahl is correlated with the number of firms in an industry because its lower bound when there are N firms is 1/N. In the more general case of unequal market share, 1/H is called "equivalent (or effective) number of firms in the industry", N_{eqi} or N_{eff}. An industry with 3 firms cannot have a lower Herfindahl than an industry with 20 firms when firms have equal market shares. But as market shares of the 20-firm industry diverge from equality the Herfindahl can exceed that of the equal-market-share 3-firm industry (e.g., if one firm has 81% of the market and the remaining 19 have 1% each, then $H=0.658$). A higher Herfindahl signifies a less competitive (i.e., more concentrated) industry.

=== Appearance in market structure ===
It can be shown that the Herfindahl index arises as a natural consequence of assuming that a given market's structure is described by Cournot competition. Suppose that we have a Cournot model for competition between $n$ firms with different linear marginal costs and a homogeneous product. Then the profit of the $i$-th firm $\pi_{i}$ is:
$$\pi_{i} = P(Q)q_{i} - c_{i}q_{i}, \quad Q = \sum_{i=1}^{n}q_{i}$$
where $q_{i}$ is the quantity produced by each firm, $c_{i}$ is the marginal cost of production for each firm, and $P(Q)$ is the price of the product. Taking the derivative of the firm's profit function with respect to its output to maximize its profit gives us:
$$\frac{\partial\pi_i}{\partial q_i} = 0 \implies P'(Q)q_{i} + P(Q) - c_{i} = 0 \implies - \frac{dP}{dQ} q_{i} = P-c_{i}$$
Dividing by $P$ gives us each firm's profit margin:
$${P-c_{i}\over{P}} = -{dP\over{dQ}}{q_{i}\over{P}} = -{dP/P\over{dQ/Q}} {q_{i}\over{Q}} = {s_{i}\over{\eta}}$$
where $s_{i} = q_{i}/Q$ is the market share and $\eta = -d\log Q/d\log P$ is the price elasticity of demand. Multiplying each firm's profit margin by its market share gives us:
$$s_{1}\left( {P-c_{1}\over{P}} \right) + \cdots + s_{n}\left( {P-c_{n}\over{P}} \right) = {H\over{\eta}}$$
where $H$ is the Herfindahl index. Therefore, the Herfindahl index is directly related to the weighted average of the profit margins of firms under Cournot competition with linear marginal costs.

=== Effective assets in a portfolio ===
The Herfindahl index is also a widely used metric for portfolio concentration. In portfolio theory, the Herfindahl index is related to the effective number of positions $N_{\text{eff}} = 1/H$ held in a portfolio, where $H = \sum \ |w\ |^{2}$ is computed as the sum of the squares of the proportion of market value invested in each security. A low H-index implies a very diversified portfolio: as an example, a portfolio with $H = 0.02$ is equivalent to a portfolio with $N_{\text{eff}} = 50$ equally weighted positions. The H-index has been shown to be one of the most efficient measures of portfolio diversification.

It may also be used as a constraint to force a portfolio to hold a minimum number of effective assets:
$$\ |w\ |^{2} \leq N_{\text{eff}}^{-1}$$
For commonly used portfolio optimization techniques, such as mean-variance and CVaR, the optimal solution may be found using second-order cone programming.

== Decomposition ==
Supposing that $N$ firms share all the market, each one with a participation of $x_i$ and market share $s_i = x_i/\sum_{j=1}^N x_j$, then the index can be expressed as $H = \frac 1 N + (N-1)\sigma^2$, where $\sigma^2$ is the statistical variance of the firm shares, defined as $\sigma^2 = \frac1{N-1} \sum_{i=1}^N \left(s_i-\mu\right)^2$ where $\mu = \frac 1 N$ is the mean of participations. If all firms have equal (identical) shares (that is, if the market structure is completely symmetric, in which case $s_i=1/N$) then $\sigma^2$ is zero and $H$ equals $1/N$. If the number of firms in the market is held constant, then a higher variance due to a higher level of asymmetry between firms' shares (that is, a higher share dispersion) will result in a higher index value.

== See also ==
- Lerner index
- Concentration ratio
- Marketing strategy
- Microeconomics
- N50 statistic – a measure of concentration used in genomics
- Small but significant and non-transitory increase in price – a test to determine the relevant market
- Diversity index and specifically Simpson index
