= Concentration ratio =

Mathematical ratios used to quantify concentration of market shares in industries

In economics, concentration ratios are used to quantify market concentration and are based on companies' market shares in a given industry.

A concentration ratio (CR) is the sum of the percentage market shares of (a pre-specified number of) the largest firms in an industry. An n-firm concentration ratio is a common measure of market structure and shows the combined market share of the n largest firms in the market. For example, if n = 5, CR_{5} defines the combined market share of the five largest firms in an industry.

Competition economists and competition authorities typically employ concentration ratios (CR_{n}) and the Herfindahl-Hirschman Index (HHI) as measures of market concentration.

== Calculation ==
The concentration ratio is calculated as follows:
$$\text{CR}_n = C_1 + C_2 + \cdots + C_n = \sum\limits_{i=1}^n C_i$$
where $C_i$ defines the market share of the $i$th largest firm in an industry as a percentage of total industry market share, and $n$ defines the number of firms included in the concentration ratio calculation.

The $\text{CR}_4$ and $\text{CR}_8$ concentration ratios are commonly used. Concentration ratios show the extent of largest firms' market shares in a given industry. Specifically, a concentration ratio close to 0% denotes a low concentration industry, and a concentration ratio near 100% shows that an industry has high concentration.

== Concentration levels ==
Concentration ratios range from 0%–100%. Concentration levels are explained as follows:

Concentration Level	Concentration Ratio	Explanation
Perfect competition	${n \over N}$	Perfect competition exists where an industry's concentration ratio is CR_{n} = n/N, where N is the number of firms in the industry. That is, all firms have an equal market share.
Low concentration	${n \over N}$ – 40%	A concentration ratio of close to 0% implies perfect competition at the least. This is only possible in an industry where there is a very large number of firms.
Medium concentration	40% – 70%	An industry in this range is likely an oligopoly. An oligopoly describes a market structure which is dominated by a small number of firms each with significant market shares.
High concentration	70% – 100%	This category ranges from an oligopoly to a monopoly.

== Benefits and shortfalls ==
Concentration ratios can readily be calculated from industry data, but they are a simplistic, single parameter statistic. They can be used to quantify market concentration in a given industry in a relevant and succinct manner, but do not capture all available information about the distribution of market shares. In particular, the definition of the concentration ratio does not use the market shares of all the firms in the industry and does not account for the distribution of firm size. Also, it does not provide much detail about competitiveness of an industry.

The following example exposes the aforementioned shortfalls of the concentration ratio.

=== Example ===
The table below shows the market shares of the largest firms in two different industries (Industry A and Industry B). Aside from the tabulated market shares for Industry A and Industry B, both industries are the same in terms of the number of firms operating in the industry and their respective market shares. In this example, in both cases, all other firms have a share of less than 20%.

Percentage market shares for two different industries
Firm	Industry A	Industry B
Firm 1	20%	35%
Firm 2	20%	25%
Firm 3	20%	10%
Firm 4	20%	10%

It is evident from these figures that Industry B is more concentrated than Industry A, since the market share is distributed more heavily towards the more dominant firms. However, Industry A and Industry B both have CR_{4} ratios of 80%. This shows that the CR ratio does not fully take into account the distribution of market share amongst the most dominant firms.

== See also ==
- National Statistics Economic Trends: Concentration Ratios 2004
- Market form
- Herfindahl index
- Microeconomics
- Market dominance strategies
