= Patman =

Patman may refer to:

- Mr. Patman, 1981 film directed by John Guillermin
- Robinson–Patman Act of 1936, a United States federal law that prohibits anticompetitive practices,
- William Neff Patman, (1927–2008), American politician and member of the United States House of Representatives
- Wright Patman (1893–1976), U.S. Congressman from Texas and chair of the United States House Committee on Banking and Currency (1965–75)
- Wright Patman Dam, earth-fill dam across the Sulphur River in northeast Texas in the United States
- Wright Patman Lake, reservoir in northeast Texas in the United States
- Patrick Patterson, Basketball player for the Toronto Raptors
