= History of United States antitrust law =

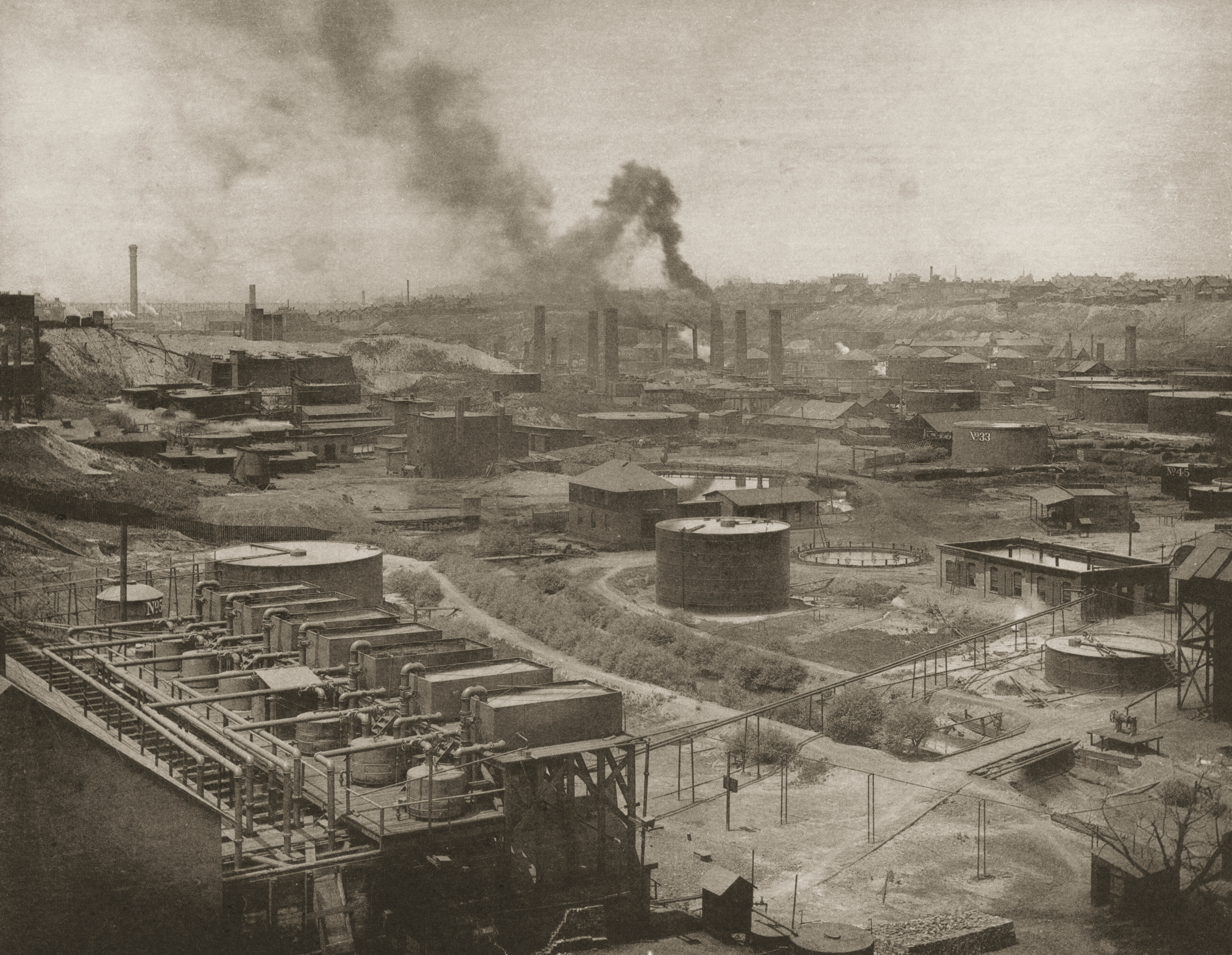
Standard Oil (Refinery No. 1 in Cleveland, Ohio, pictured) was a major company broken up under United States antitrust laws.

The history of United States antitrust law is generally taken to begin with the Sherman Antitrust Act 1890, although some form of policy to regulate competition in the market economy has existed throughout the common law's history. Although "trust" had a technical legal meaning, the word was commonly used to denote big business, especially a large, growing manufacturing conglomerate of the sort that suddenly emerged in great numbers in the 1880s and 1890s. The Interstate Commerce Act of 1887 began a shift towards federal rather than state regulation of big business. It was followed by the Sherman Antitrust Act of 1890, the Clayton Antitrust Act and the Federal Trade Commission Act of 1914, the Robinson-Patman Act of 1936, and the Celler-Kefauver Act of 1950.

== Common law ==
- Restraint of trade
- Mogul Steamship Co Ltd v McGregor, Gow & Co [1892] AC 25, a UK House of Lords case condoning cartels shortly after the Sherman Act 1890 was passed

== Late 19th century ==
During the late 19th century hundreds of small short-line railroads were being bought up and consolidated into giant systems. Separate laws and policies emerged regarding railroads and financial concerns such as banks and insurance companies. Advocates of strong antitrust laws argued that for the American economy to be successful, it requires free competition and the opportunity for individual Americans to build their own businesses. As Senator John Sherman put it, "If we will not endure a king as a political power we should not endure a king over the production, transportation, and sale of any of the necessaries of life." Congress passed the Sherman Antitrust Act almost unanimously in 1890, and it remains the core of antitrust policy. The Act makes it illegal to try to restrain trade or to form a monopoly. It gives the Justice Department the mandate to go to federal court for orders to stop illegal behavior or to impose remedies.

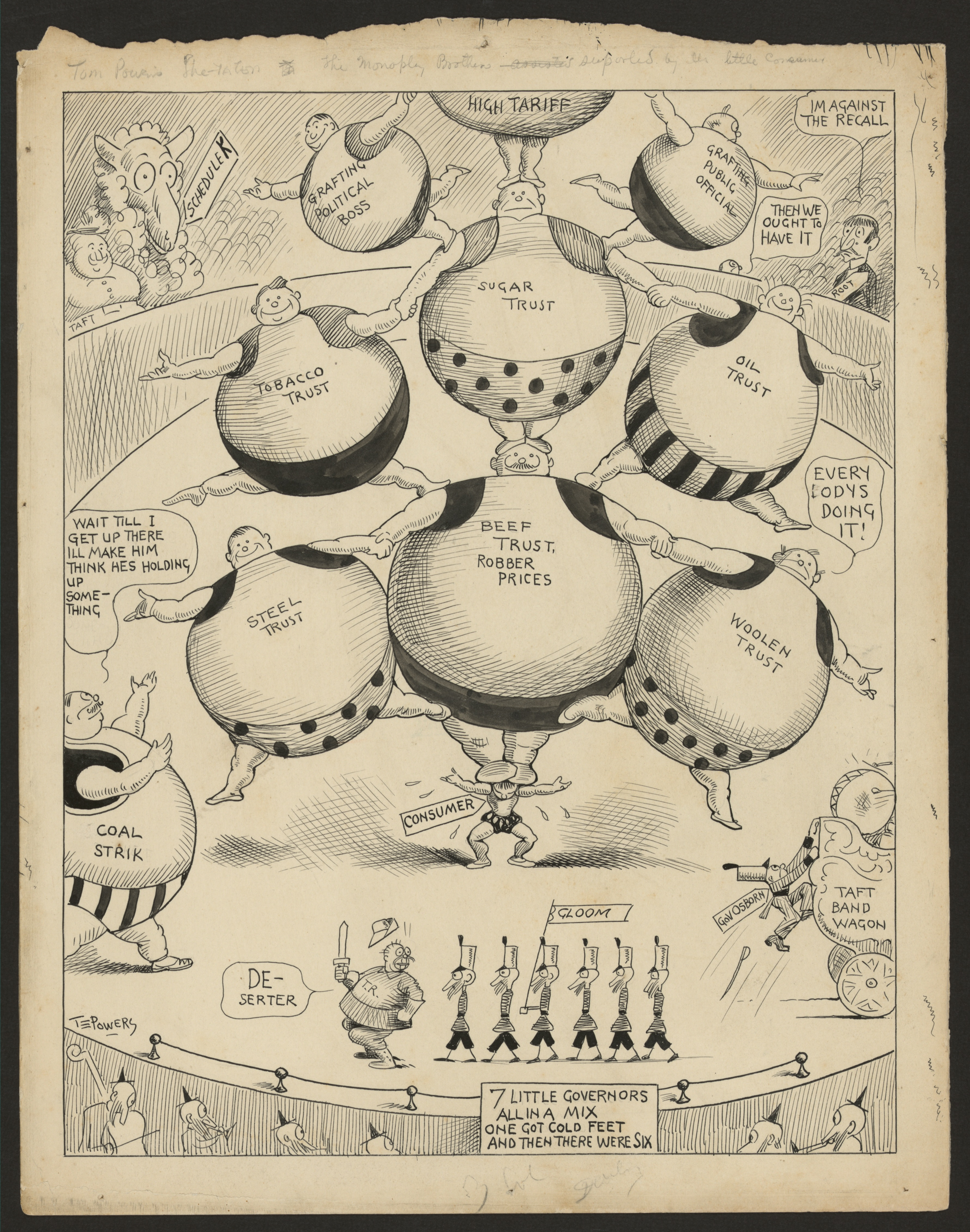
Monopoly brothers--high profits all carried by hapless little consumer 1912; by Thomas Powers

== Progressive era: 1890s–1917 ==
Standard Oil was widely hated. Many newspapers reprinted attacks from a flagship Democratic newspaper, The New York World, which made this trust a special target. For example, a feature article in 1897 stated:

There has been no outrage too colossal, no petty meanness too contemptible for these freebooters to engage in. From hounding and driving prosperous businessman to beggery and suicide, to holding up and plundering widows and orphans, the little dealer in the country and the crippled peddler on the highway—all this is entered into the exploits of this organized gang of commercial bandits.

There were legal efforts to curtail the oil monopoly in the Midwest and South. Tennessee, Illinois, Kentucky and Kansas took the lead in 1904–1905, followed by Arkansas, Iowa, Maryland, Minnesota, Mississippi, Nebraska, Ohio, Oklahoma, Texas and West Virginia. The results were mixed. Federal action finally won out in 1911, splitting Standard Oil into 33 companies. The 33 seldom competed with each other. The federal decision together with the Clayton Antitrust Act of 1914 and that year's creation of the Federal Trade Commission largely met the need for antitrust regulation and enforcement. The new framework after 1914 had little or no impact on the direction and magnitude of merger activity.

Public officials during the Progressive Era put passing and enforcing strong antitrust high on their agenda. President Theodore Roosevelt sued 45 companies under the Sherman Act, while William Howard Taft sued 75. In 1902, Roosevelt stopped the formation of the Northern Securities Company, which threatened to monopolize transportation in the Northwest (see Northern Securities Co. v. United States).

The Bureau of Corporations was created in 1903 as a purely investigative agency in the Department of Commerce and Labor. It was replaced by the Federal Trade Commission in 1914, which has civil law enforcement powers.

=== Antitrust under Roosevelt and Taft ===
Roosevelt's antitrust record over eight years included 18 civil cases and 26 criminal antitrust cases resulting in 22 convictions and 22 acquittals. Taft's four years had 54 civil and 36 criminal suits and Taft's prosecutor secured 55 convictions and 35 acquittals. Taft's cases included many leading firms in major sectors: Standard Oil; American Tobacco; United States Steel; Aluminum Company of America; International Harvester; National Cash Register; Westinghouse; General Electric; Kodak; Dupont; Union Pacific railroad; and Southern Pacific railroad. It also included trusts or combinations in beef, lumber, wine, turpentine, wallpaper, licorice, thread, and watches. The targets even included operations run by Taft's personal friends, such as Ohio-based National Cash Register. The media gave extensive exposure, especially to cases against Standard Oil and American Tobacco, which reached directly tens of millions of consumers. Taft's attorney general George W. Wickersham personally supervised the most important cases against Standard Oil and American Tobacco. He argued to the Supreme Court that trusts should be dissolved into their constituent parts, arguing they were artificial creations and did not achieve their positions through normal business methods and hence were guilty of violating the Sherman act. The government brief argued that dismemberment would correct this inequity and would force and restore normal competition. The Court agreed in 1911 and ordered the Justice Department to draw up complete reorganization plans in six months. Wickersham and his staff, all expert lawyers, were not experts in business management. The hurriedly created over thirty new corporations to replace Standard, plus several in tobacco.

Public opinion became angry due to the subsequent inflation. Wickersham discovered that trust busting meant higher prices for consumers, telling Taft "the disintegrated companies of both the oil and tobacco trust are spending many times what was formerly spent by anyone in advertising in the newspapers." 16 new cases were launched in the last 2 months of the Taft administration.

=== Standard Oil ===
The most notorious trust was the Standard Oil Company; John D. Rockefeller in the 1870s and 1880s had used economic threats against competitors and secret rebate deals with railroads to build a virtual monopoly in the oil business. Some minor competitors remained in business. The Federal government sued and in 1911 the Supreme Court agreed that in recent years (1900–1904) Standard had violated the Sherman Act (see Standard Oil Co. of New Jersey v. United States). It ordered the Justice Department to come up with a plan to break up the trust. It broke the monopoly into three dozen separate companies that competed with one another, including Standard Oil of New Jersey (later known as Exxon and now ExxonMobil), Standard Oil of Indiana (Amoco), Standard Oil Company of New York (Mobil, again, later merged with Exxon to form ExxonMobil), of California (Chevron), and so on. In approving the breakup, the Supreme Court added the "rule of reason" -- not all big companies or monopolies are evil, and the courts (not the executive branch) are to make that determination. To be harmful, a trust had to damage the economic environment of its competitors.

=== Major lawsuits and investigations ===
- United States v. E. C. Knight Co., 156 U.S. 1 (1895)
  - Supreme Court restricted monopoly regulation.
- Industrial Commission (1898)
  - Investigates railroad pricing, among other things
- Northern Securities Co. v. United States, 193 U.S. 197 (1904)
  - The Supreme Court orders a regional railway monopoly, formed through a merger of 3 corporations, to be dissolved.
- Swift & Co. v. United States, 196 U.S. 375 (1905)
  - The antitrust laws entitled the federal government to regulate monopolies that had a direct impact on commerce
- Standard Oil Co. of New Jersey v. United States, 221 U.S. 1 (1911)
  - Standard Oil was dismantled into geographical entities given its size, and that it was too much of a monopoly
- United States v. American Tobacco Company, 221 U.S. 106 (1911)
  - Found to have monopolized the trade.

== Clayton Act Reforms ==
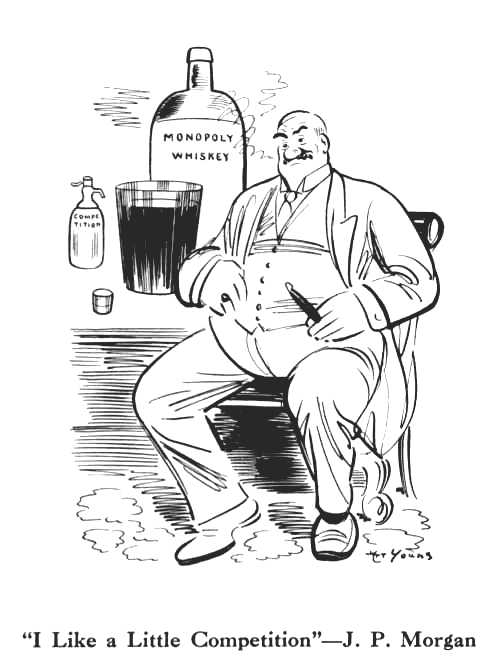
"I Like a Little Competition"—J. P. Morgan by Art Young. Cartoon relating to the answer J. P. Morgan gave when asked whether he disliked competition at the Pujo Committee.

In 1914, Congress passed the Clayton Antitrust Act to increase the government's capacity to intervene and break up big business. The Act removed the application of antitrust laws to trade unions, and introduced controls on the merger of corporations.

United States Steel Corporation, which was much larger than Standard Oil, won its antitrust suit in 1920 despite never having delivered the benefits to consumers that Standard Oil did. In fact, it lobbied for tariff protection that reduced competition, and so contending that it was one of the "good trusts" that benefited the economy is somewhat doubtful. Likewise, International Harvester survived its court test, but other trusts in the tobacco, meatpacking, and bathtub fixture industries were broken up. Over the years hundreds of executives of competing companies who met together illegally to fix prices went to federal prison.

One problem some perceived with the Sherman Act was that it was not entirely clear what practices were prohibited, leading to businessmen not knowing what they were permitted to do, and government antitrust authorities not sure what business practices they could challenge. In the words of one critic, Isabel Paterson, "As freak legislation, the antitrust laws stand alone. Nobody knows what it is they forbid." In 1914 Congress passed the Clayton Act, which prohibited specific business actions (such as price discrimination and tying) if they substantially lessened competition. At the same time Congress established the Federal Trade Commission (FTC), whose legal and business experts could force business to agree to "consent decrees", which provided an alternative mechanism to police antitrust.

American hostility to big business began to decrease after the Progressive Era. For example, Ford Motor Company dominated auto manufacturing, built millions of cheap cars that put America on wheels, and at the same time lowered prices, raised wages, and promoted manufacturing efficiency. Ford became as much of a popular hero as Rockefeller had been a villain. Welfare capitalism made large companies an attractive place to work; new career paths opened up in middle management; local suppliers discovered that big corporations were big purchasers. Talk of trust busting faded away. Under the leadership of Herbert Hoover, the government in the 1920s promoted business cooperation, fostered the creation of self-policing trade associations, and made the FTC an ally of "respectable business".

== New Deal ==
During the New Deal, likewise, attempts were made to stop cutthroat competition, attempts that appeared very similar to cartelization, which would be illegal under antitrust laws if attempted by someone other than government. The National Industrial Recovery Act (NIRA) was a short-lived program in 1933–35 designed to strengthen trade associations, and raise prices, profits and wages at the same time. The Robinson-Patman Act of 1936 sought to protect local retailers against the onslaught of the more efficient chain stores, by making it illegal to discount prices. To control big business, the New Deal policymakers preferred federal and state regulation—controlling the rates and telephone services provided by American Telephone & Telegraph Company (AT&T), for example—and by building up countervailing power in the form of labor unions.

The antitrust laws came to be seen by the Supreme Court as a "charter of freedom", designed to protect free enterprise in America. One view of the statutory purpose, urged for example by Justice Douglas, was that the goal was not only to protect consumers, but at least as importantly to prohibit the use of power to control the marketplace.

"We have here the problem of bigness. Its lesson should by now have been burned into our memory by Brandeis. The Curse of Bigness shows how size can become a menace--both industrial and social. It can be an industrial menace because it creates gross inequalities against existing or putative competitors. It can be a social menace...In final analysis, size in steel is the measure of the power of a handful of men over our economy...The philosophy of the Sherman Act is that it should not exist...Industrial power should be decentralized. It should be scattered into many hands so that the fortunes of the people will not be dependent on the whim or caprice, the political prejudices, the emotional stability of a few self-appointed men...That is the philosophy and the command of the Sherman Act. It is founded on a theory of hostility to the concentration in private hands of power so great that only a government of the people should have it." Dissenting opinion of Justice Douglas in United States v. Columbia Steel Co.

== Post World War Two ==
By the 1970s, fears of "cutthroat" competition had been displaced by confidence that a fully competitive marketplace produced fair returns to everyone. The fear was that monopoly made for higher prices, less production, inefficiency and less prosperity for all. As unions faded in strength, the government paid much more attention to the damages that unfair competition could cause to consumers, especially in terms of higher prices, poorer service, and restricted choice.

In 1982, the breakup of the Bell System occurred. AT&T was broken up into one long-distance company and seven regional "Baby Bells", arguing that competition should replace monopoly for the benefit of consumers and the economy as a whole.

The pace of business takeovers quickened in the 1990s, but whenever one large corporation sought to acquire another, it first had to obtain the approval of either the FTC or the Justice Department. Often the government demanded that certain subsidiaries be sold so that the new company would not monopolize a particular geographical market.

== 21st century ==
In 1999 a coalition of 19 states and the federal Justice Department sued Microsoft. A highly publicized trial found that Microsoft had strong-armed many companies in an attempt to prevent competition from the Netscape browser. In 2000, the trial court ordered Microsoft split in two to punish it, and prevent it from future misbehavior; however the Court of Appeals reversed the decision and removed the judge from the case for improperly discussing the case with the media while it was still pending. With the case in front of a new judge, Microsoft and the government settled, with the government dropping the case in return for Microsoft agreeing to cease many of the practices the government challenged. During his defense, CEO Bill Gates argued that Microsoft always worked on behalf of the consumer and that splitting the company would diminish efficiency and slow the pace of software development.

- Apple Inc. litigation

While the sentiment among regulators and judges has generally recommended that breakups are not as remedies for antitrust enforcement, recent scholarship has found that this hostility to breakups by administrators is largely unwarranted. In fact, some scholars have argued breakups, even if incorrectly targeted, could arguably still encourage collaboration, innovation, and efficiency.

== See also ==
- US antitrust law
- US labor law history
- EU competition law
- New Brandeis movement
