= Brown Shoe Co. v. United States =

- Supreme Court of the United States

Argued December 6, 1961 Decided June 25, 1962
- Full case name: Brown Shoe Co., Inc. v. United States
- Citations: 370 U.S. 294 (more)

Case history
- Prior: preliminary injunction denied, 1956 Trade Cas. (CCH) ¶ 68,244 (E.D. Mo. 1956); judgment for plaintiff, 179 F. Supp. 721 (E.D. Mo. 1959); probable jurisdiction noted, 363 U.S. 825 (1960)

Holding
- Congress intended courts to identify an illegal merger under Section 7 of the Clayton Antitrust Act by using economic and other factors to evaluate the proposed merger's harm to market competition.

Court membership
- Chief Justice Earl Warren Associate Justices Hugo Black · Felix Frankfurter; William O. Douglas · Tom C. Clark; John M. Harlan II · William J. Brennan Jr. Potter Stewart · Byron White

Case opinions
- Majority: Warren, joined by Black, Douglas, Clark, Brennan, Stewart
- Concurrence: Clark
- Concur/dissent: Harlan
- Frankfurter and White took no part in the consideration or decision of the case.

Laws applied
- Celler–Kefauver Amendment to section 7 of the Clayton Act (15 U.S.C. § 18)

In Brown Shoe Co. v. United States, 370 U.S. 294 (1962), the Supreme Court of the United States held that a merger between two shoe companies violated federal antitrust law. The case was among the first in which the Supreme Court interpreted the 1950 amendments to section 7 of the Clayton Act, and it laid down concepts that proved influential in the development of modern merger jurisprudence and market definition principles. In an opinion by Chief Justice Earl Warren, the Court stated that antitrust law "protects competition, not competitors", but it also reasoned that courts "must give effect" to "Congress' desire to promote competition through the protection of viable, small, locally owned businesses" even if the result was higher prices for consumers, a populist vision of antitrust that has faced heavy criticism. According to the antitrust scholar C. Paul Rogers III, Brown Shoe is "one of the most maligned antitrust decisions in history" but remains "foundational ... even though it embodies values that have fundamentally shifted."

== Background ==
Brown Shoe Co. and G. R. Kinney Co. announced plans to merge in July 1955. As a result of previous acquisitions, Brown Shoe was America's fourth-largest manufacturer of footwear, supplying about 4% of the nation's shoes; it had also made significant inroads into the retail sector by acquiring Wohl Shoe Co. (which operated shoe departments in department stores), Regal Shoe Corp. (which owned over 100 retail outlets), and other smaller companies. Kinney was the nation's largest family-style retail shoe chain, but its sales were only about 1.2% of the national retail shoe market. It also owned four manufacturing plants, which made it the nation's twelfth-largest shoe manufacturer with approximately 0.5% of the national supply. The two companies' retail outlets competed with one another in some cities.

In November 1955, the Justice Department sued in the U.S. District Court for the Eastern District of Missouri to block the merger on the grounds that it violated section 7 of the Clayton Act, which prohibits mergers "where in any line of commerce in any section of the country, the effect of such acquisition may be substantially to lessen competition, or to tend to create a monopoly". Rejecting the government's motion to preliminarily enjoin the merger, the court allowed it to proceed so long as the companies' operations and assets were kept separate. The merger was carried out on May 1, 1956. As a result, Brown Shoe controlled 7.2% of retail shoe stores and 2.3% of retail shoe outlets more generally. Although Kinney had not previously purchased any shoes from Brown Shoe, the latter soon became the former's largest external supplier.

The government's case proceeded to trial before Judge Randolph Weber. The court held that the merger violated the Clayton Act both horizontally with respect to retail (but not manufacturing) and vertically because manufacturers that competed with Brown Shoe would be unable to sell in Kinney's retail outlets. It defined men's shoes, women's shoes, and children's shoes as each being a separate "line of commerce", and it defined the relevant "section of the country" as being any city with a population of 10,000 or more where both companies had stores. The court ordered total divestiture. Invoking the Expediting Act, Brown Shoe appealed directly to the U.S. Supreme Court, which heard oral arguments on December 6, 1961.

== Decision ==
Chief Justice Earl Warren delivered the opinion of the Court on June 25, 1962, affirming the decision of the district court. He began by discussing the legislative history of the 1950 amendments to the Clayton Act, writing that they reflect congressional concern about "a rising tide of economic concentration in the American economy". He described the amendments as enabling the courts to "arrest[] mergers at a time when the trend to a lessening of competition in a line of commerce was still in its incipiency"; their use of the word "may" demonstrated that Congress's "concern was with probabilities, not certainties." But in widely quoted language, Warren noted that Congress was "concern[ed] with the protection of competition, not competitors" and that it sought "to restrain mergers only to the extent that such combinations may tend to lessen competition". He wrote that a merger must be "functionally viewed, in the context of its particular industry", and in a highly influential footnote 38, he stated:

Statistics reflecting the shares of the market controlled by the industry leaders and the parties to the merger are, of course, the primary index of market power; but only a further examination of the particular market—its structure, history and probable future—can provide the appropriate setting for judging the probable anticompetitive effect of the merger.

Warren then turned to the vertical aspects of the merger. In defining the relevant market, he stated that cross-elasticity of demand creates the "outer boundaries" of a market, but he added that certain "well-defined submarkets" can also qualify as a "line of commerce" under section 7. A well-known and controversial paragraph of the decision lists seven "practical indicia" for defining a submarket. The Court agreed with the district court that men's, women's, and children's shoes are distinct lines of commerce; it rejected Brown Shoe's invitation to subdivide those markets into smaller ones based on price, quality, age, or sex. Emphasizing both the two companies' size and "the trend toward concentration" in the shoe industry, Warren concluded that the government had shown a probable anticompetitive effect.

Next, the Court considered the horizontal dimensions of the merger in the retail sector (the government did not appeal the district court's findings concerning manufacturing). It accepted the district court's conclusion that the right unit of analysis was cities with populations greater than 10,000 where both companies owned a retail outlet, pointing to the importance of "a pragmatic, factual approach" to market definition. Warren cited data showing that the companies' combined share of shoe sales exceeded 5% in at least one line of commerce in 118 cities; exceeded 5% in all three lines of commerce in 47 cities; and exceeded 20% or 40% in a smaller number of cities (for instance, in Dodge City, Kansas, the figure was 57% of women's shoes and 49% of children's shoes). The Court reasoned that if the merger were approved, it might be obliged to approve similar consolidation efforts by Brown Shoe's competitors, which could lead to an oligopoly; it also stated that even control of a small market share could harm competition in the "fragmented" shoe industry. Warren reiterated that antitrust law protects "consumers, not competitors" and that a merger was therefore not unlawful just because it might harm smaller stores. Then, however, in a part of the opinion that (according to the antitrust lawyers Robert Skitol and Kenneth Vorrasi) faced frequent criticism for "elevat[ing] populist sentiments over considerations of efficiency and consumer welfare", he added:

But we cannot fail to recognize Congress' desire to promote competition through the protection of viable, small, locally owned business. Congress appreciated that occasional higher costs and prices might result from the maintenance of fragmented industries and markets. It resolved these competing considerations in favor of decentralization. We must give effect to that decision.

Warren noted that Brown Shoe had presented no "mitigating factors" in support of the merger, such as business failure by one company or a need for small competitors to join together in order to compete effectively. In light of the increasing trend toward concentration in the shoe industry, a trend that was "being accelerated through giant steps striding across a hundred cities at a time", the Court concluded "that this is an appropriate place at which to call a halt".

Concurring, Justice Tom C. Clark added that the merger had a reasonable prospect of harming competition in the national market for shoes of all kinds. He also criticized the Expediting Act as "a great burden on the Court" that "seldom results in much expedition".

Justice John Marshall Harlan II concurred in part and dissented in part. He would have dismissed the appeal for want of jurisdiction on the grounds that the district court's decision, which left open the question of how the divestiture would be implemented, was not a "final judgment" under the Expediting Act. On the merits, Harlan agreed with the Court's judgment but declined to join its opinion because he believed it went "far beyond what is necessary to decide the case".

== Reactions and legacy ==
Brown Shoe faced a "predictably strong and negative" reception that "has continued unabated", according to the antitrust scholar C. Paul Rogers III. The business community was critical, and the decision contributed to the Warren Court's reputation as hostile to business. In 1965, Robert Bork and Ward Bowman argued that the merger "did not even remotely threaten competition", emphasizing the companies' low market share and commenting that the fragmented shoe industry "was as close to pure competition as is possible outside a classroom model". Bork added in his book The Antitrust Paradox that "Brown Shoe has considerable claim to the title" of "worst antitrust essay ever written". The economist John L. Peterman argued in a 1975 article that the decision relied on "extraordinarily weak" evidence that "at times even bordered on fiction" and that the Court displayed "a lack of understanding of the working of a competitive system". On the other hand, the antitrust expert Milton Handler praised the decision, and the antitrust scholar Herbert Hovenkamp has written that the Court's approach was consistent with Congress's intent in amending section 7.

Brown Shoe's populist vision of antitrust—one that prioritized decentralization over efficiency and low prices—held sway throughout the 1960s, when mergers were regularly blocked. As the Court began moving away from that model in the 1970s to emphasize consumer welfare instead, its decisions (such as United States v. General Dynamics Corp. (1974)) appealed to different parts of Brown Shoe, such as the footnote discussing factors other than market share. The Reagan administration's Baxter guidelines similarly relied on some aspects of Brown Shoe while moving away from its central anti-concentration ideas. In a 1983 article, Donald Baker and William Blumenthal commented that "as the case law has evolved since Brown Shoe, populist concerns have become largely vestigial. They may still linger in the body of antitrust law, but ... [t]he key populist phrases of the Warren Court era have been muffled."

But unlike many of the Warren Court's merger cases, Brown Shoe remains relevant in modern antitrust law. It "remains important for its explanation of the amended Section 7 standard and for selected soundbites that have become fixtures of lower court merger opinions", and "[e]ven aspects of the opinion that were once regarded as outmoded", such as its hostility to concentration and its "practical indicia" test, "are currently seeing a resurgence", according to a 2025 casebook. The Biden administration's 2023 merger guidelines, which reflected a neo-Brandeisian skepticism of the consumer welfare paradigm, cited Brown Shoe heavily. In an article marking Brown Shoe's fiftieth anniversary, Skitol and Vorrasi described it as "the most important merger law decision ever issued and one of the most important antitrust decisions of all time", one that has continued to shape American merger jurisprudence even as ideas about antitrust enforcement have changed radically.
