= Wright Patman Dam =

Earth-fill dam across the Sulphur River in northeast Texas in the United States

Coordinates: 33.327°N 94.161°W

- Interactive map of Wright Patman Dam
- Country: United States
- Location: Texas
- Status: Operational
- Opening date: 1956

Wright Patman Dam (formerly called Texarkana Dam) is an earth-fill dam across the Sulphur River in northeast Texas in the United States. The water impounded by the dam forms Wright Patman Lake.

== Geography ==
Wright Patman Dam is situated nine miles (14 km) southwest of Texarkana, Texas. The dam straddles the border between Bowie County and Cass County.

The dam is 18,500 feet (5,600 m) long, with a 200-foot (61 m) wide spillway. The top of the dam is 286 feet (87 m) above sea level, or 100 feet (30 m) above the riverbed.

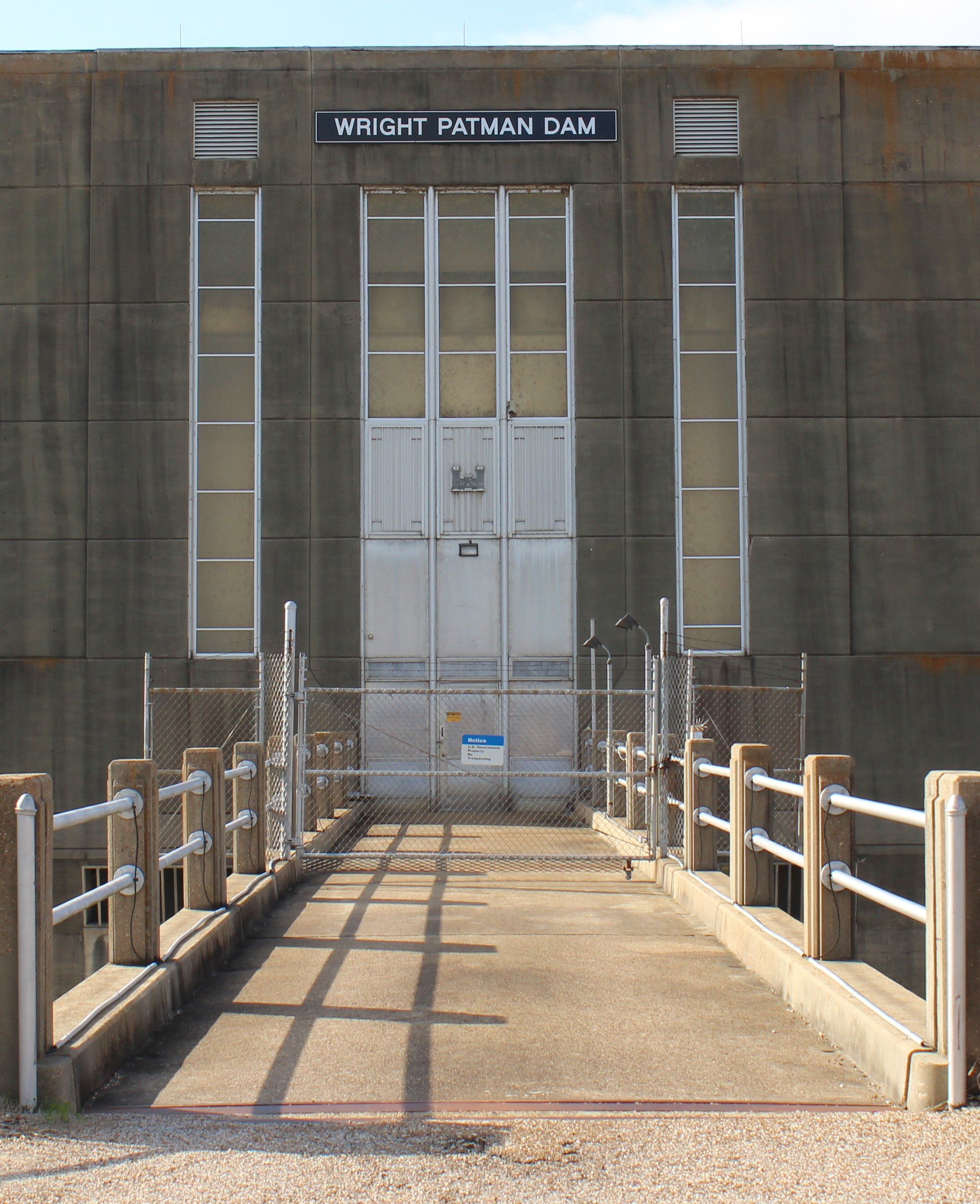
The control center for the Lake Wright Patman dam gates.

== History ==
Wright Patman Dam, then known as Texarkana Dam, was authorized as part of the Flood Contract Act of 1946. Construction began in 1948, and the Sulphur River was blocked and routed through the dam's control gates in 1953. The gates were closed and water impounded in 1956. In 1973, the project was renamed in honor of Congressman Wright Patman of Texas.

The dam's design and construction were the responsibility of the New Orleans District of the U.S. Army Corps of Engineers. In 1973, responsibility for the dam and lake were transferred to the Fort Worth District of the Corps of Engineers.

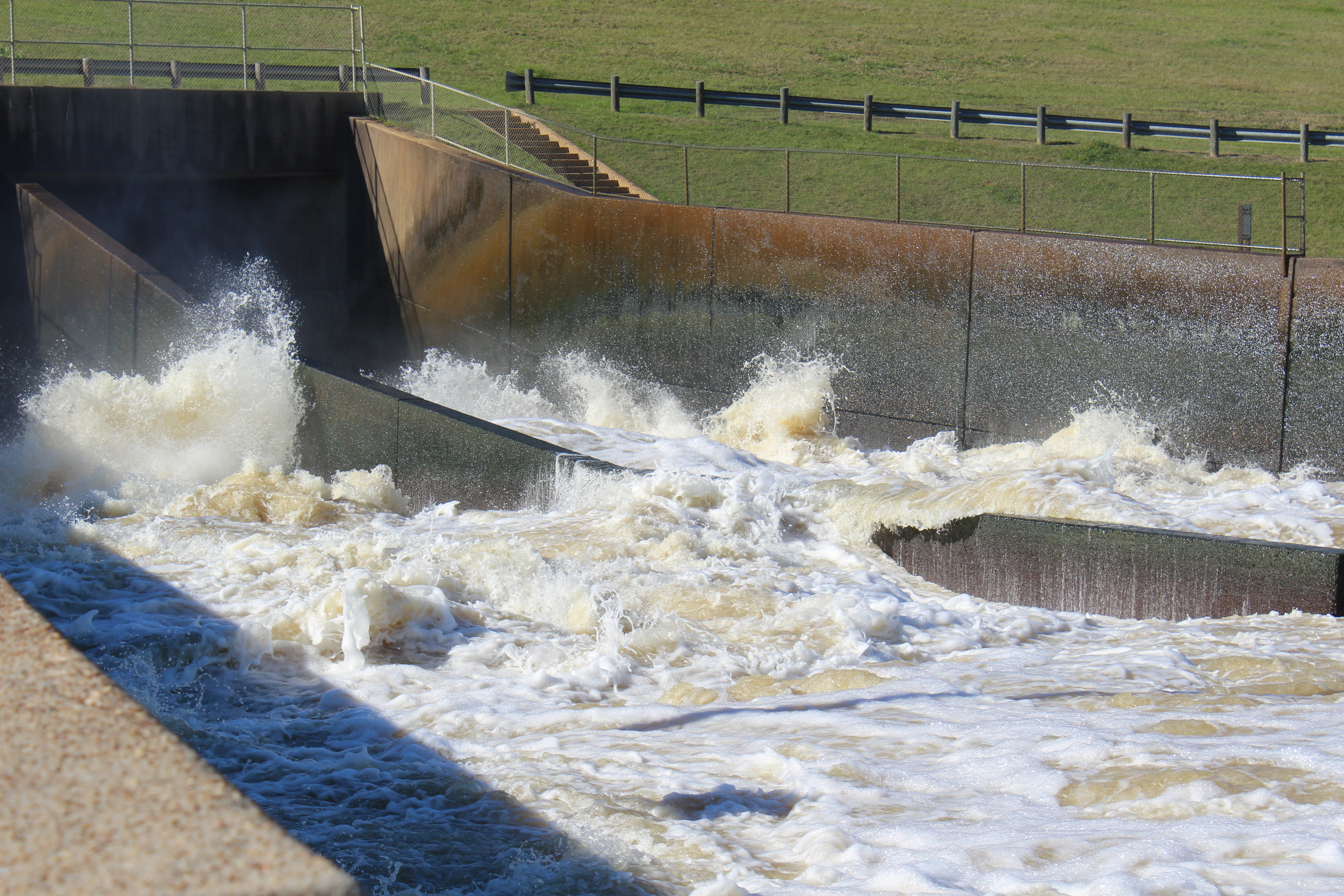
The spillway at Lake Wright Patman during the flood of 2015–2016.

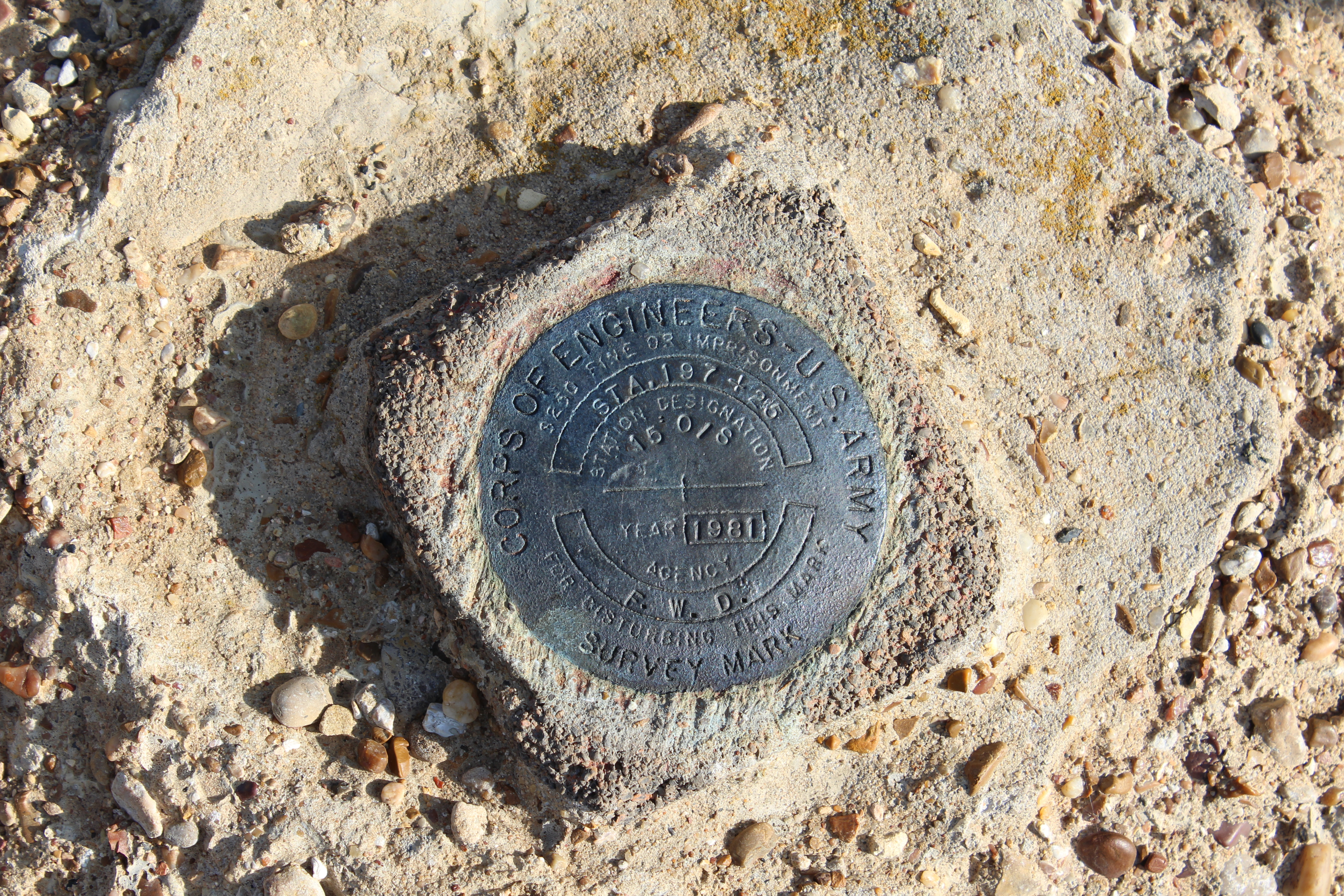
This is a brass survey marker for the Lake Wright Patman Dam installed in 1981 by the U.S. Army Corps of Engineers.

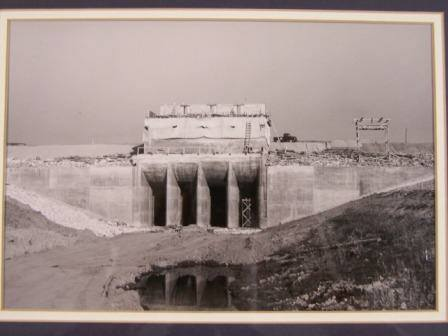
A government photo of the gates on the dam at Lake Texarkana during construction.

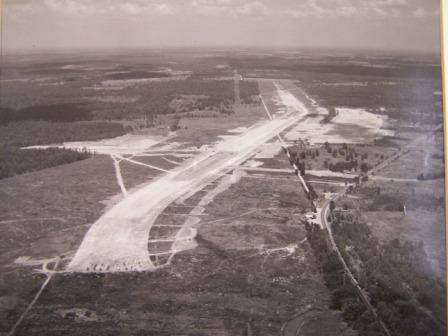
An aerial photo of the Lake Texarkana Dam during the initial phase of construction in Bowie county, Texas looking north.

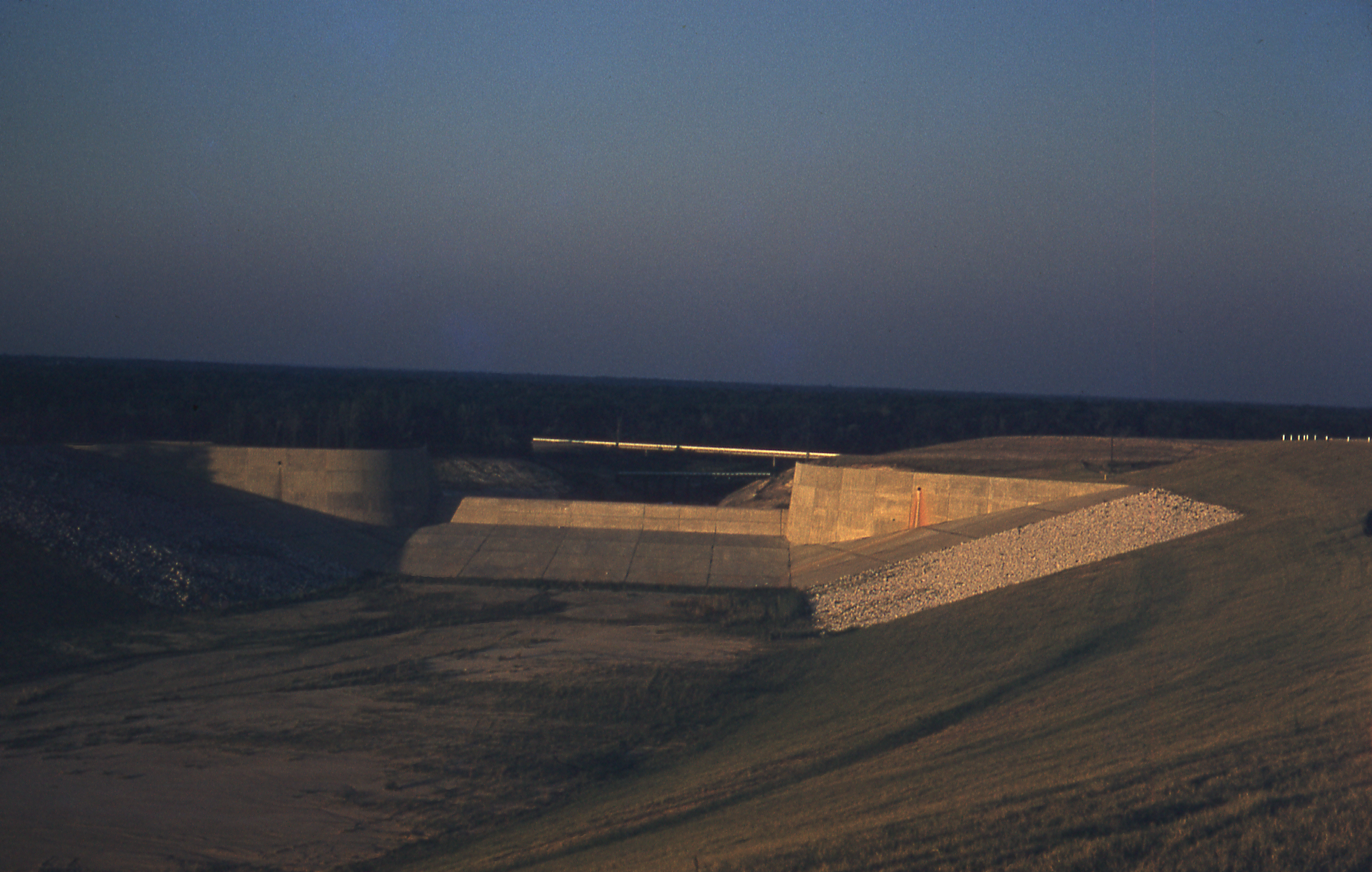
Lake Texarkana Spillway during the 1960s taken at sunset from the west side with U.S. highway 59 in the background.
