= Internet Freedom and Nondiscrimination Act of 2006 =

The Internet Freedom and Nondiscrimination Act of 2006 is a bill in the United States House of Representatives. It is one of several bills on the topic of network neutrality proposed as part of a major overhaul of the Telecommunications Act of 1996. The Act is sponsored by Rep. James Sensenbrenner (R-WI), Rep. John Conyers (D-MI), Rep. Rick Boucher (D-VA), Rep. Zoe Lofgren (D-CA), Rep. Robert Andrews (D-NJ), and Rep. Pete Visclosky (D-IN).

The legislation was approved 20-13 by the House Judiciary committee on May 25, 2006, but was never taken up on the floor of the U.S. House of Representatives, and therefore failed to become law.

== Overview ==
The "Internet Freedom and Nondiscrimination Act of 2006" has the stated purpose of the promoting competition, facilitating trade, and ensuring competitive and nondiscriminatory access to the internet (see net neutrality). It proposes a change in the Clayton Antitrust Act to prohibit certain kinds of discrimination by broadband network providers. Specifically, the Act would make it unlawful for any broadband network provider to discriminate against any content, applications, or services, or to refuse to connect to other broadband providers. It would also make it unlawful for any broadband provider to restrict the sending or receiving of lawful conduct, to charge premiums for unrestricted access to lawful content, and to fail to disclose any terms, conditions, or limitations on the service it provides. Additionally, the Act would require any prioritization or enhanced quality of service to certain types of data to apply to all data of that type, regardless of the origin of such data, without imposing a surcharge for the enhanced service.

== Supporters ==
- SavetheInternet.com
- HearUsNow.org
