= Robinson–Patman Act =

1936 US law prohibiting price discrimination

- Other short titles: Anti-Price Discrimination Act
- Long title: An Act to amend section 2 of the Clayton Act, as amended, to prevent price discrimination, and for other purposes.
- Acronyms (colloquial): RPA
- Enacted by: the 74th United States Congress

Citations
- Public law: Pub. L. 74–692
- Statutes at Large: 49 Stat. 1526

Codification
- Acts amended: Clayton Antitrust Act
- Titles amended: Title 15 of the United States Code
- U.S.C. sections created: 15 U.S.C. §§ 13a–13f
- U.S.C. sections amended: 15 U.S.C. § 13

Legislative history
- Introduced in the House as H.R. 8442 by Rep. Wright Patman D‑TX on June 11, 1935; Committee consideration by Judiciary; Passed the House on May 28, 1936; Passed the Senate on June 1936; Signed into law by President Franklin D. Roosevelt on June 19, 1936

The Robinson–Patman Act (RPA) of 1936 (or Anti-Price Discrimination Act, Pub. L. No. 74-692, 49 Stat. 1526 (codified at 15 U.S.C. § 13)) is a United States federal law that prohibits anticompetitive practices by producers, specifically price discrimination.

Co-sponsored by Senator Joseph T. Robinson (D-AR) and Representative Wright Patman (D-TX), it was designed to protect small retail shops against competition from chain stores by fixing a minimum price for retail products. Specifically, the law prevents suppliers, wholesalers, or manufacturers from supplying goods to "preferred customers" at a reduced price. It also prevents coercing suppliers into restrictions as to whom they can and can't sell goods. This means that it is illegal for a supplier to sell one truckload of goods at a steep discount to a large business, such as Walmart or Amazon, and then charge a substantially higher price for a truckload of identical goods to a small business, such as a local grocery store.

The law grew out of business practices in which chain stores were allowed to purchase goods at lower prices than other retailers. The amendment to the Clayton Antitrust Act prevented unfair price discrimination for the first time by requiring a seller to offer the same price terms to customers at a given level of trade. The RPA provided for criminal penalties but contained a specific exemption for "cooperative associations". Enforcement of the RPA's provisions began to decline beginning in the 1980s.

== Contents ==
In general, the Act prohibits sales that discriminate in price on the sale of goods to equally-situated distributors when the effect of such sales is to reduce competition. Price means net price and includes all compensation paid. The seller may not throw in additional goods or services. Injured parties or the US government may bring an action under the Act.

Liability under section 2(a) of the Act (with criminal sanctions) may arise on sales that involve:

- discrimination in price;
- on at least two consummated sales;
- from the same seller;
- to two different purchasers;
- sales must cross state lines;
- sales must be contemporaneous;
- of "commodities" of like grade and quality;
- sold for "use, consumption, or resale" within the United States; and
- the effect may be "substantially to lessen competition or tend to create a monopoly in any line of commerce."

"It shall be unlawful for any person engaged in commerce, in the course of such commerce, knowingly to induce or receive a discrimination in price which is prohibited by this section."

Defenses to the Act include cost justification and matching the price of a competitor. In practice, the "harm to competition" requirement often is the make-or-break point.

Sales to Military Exchanges and Commissaries are exempt from the act.

The United States Department of Justice and the Federal Trade Commission (FTC) have joint responsibilities for enforcement of the antitrust laws. Though the FTC has some overlapping responsibilities with the Department of Justice, and although the Robinson–Patman Act is an amendment to the Clayton Act, the Robinson–Patman Act is not widely considered to be in the core area of the antitrust laws. The FTC is active in enforcement of the Robinson–Patman Act and the Department of Justice is not.

Firms that allege discrimination can also file private civil litigation under the Act. This was the primary method of enforcement from the 1980s until 2025.

This act is one in a category of regulatory enactments that attempt to control price discriminations—or different prices for identical products. Similar prohibitions on discrimination have been found in specialized regulatory systems, such as those relating to transportation and communications.

Such statutes typically have exceptions or restrictions on range of application similar to those set out in the Robinson–Patman Act, to allow for differences in costs of output and distribution and differences in the degree of competition facing a vendor.

Early enforcement of the Robinson–Patman Act was difficult, and even today, it continues to be widely unenforced. That was in part because of its complexity, which limited consumers' ability to understand it. Even for consumers who had the education in antitrust law needed to understand the Robinson–Patman Act, it was unclear how its enforcement could benefit them.

In the late 1960s, in response to industry pressure, federal enforcement of the Robinson–Patman Act ceased for several years. Enforcement of the law was driven largely by private action of individual plaintiffs. This most likely led to a decrease in enforcement because of the difficulty individuals tend to have understanding the Act. In the mid-1970s, there was an unsuccessful attempt to repeal the Act. The Federal Trade Commission revived its use of the Act in the late 1980s, alleging discriminatory pricing against bookstores by publishers, but enforcement has declined again since the 1990s. On the other hand, over 20 states have price discrimination statutes similar to Robinson–Patman.

Volume discounts may violate the act if not all customers are made aware of the availability of the discounts.

== Notable cases ==
- In 1948, the Supreme Court upheld the Federal Trade Commission's enforcement of the Act in the landmark case Federal Trade Commission v. Morton Salt. The Commission found that Morton Salt violated the act when it sold its finest "Blue Label" salt, on a purportedly-standard quantity discount available to all customers but was really available only to five national chain stores that bought sufficient quantities of respondent's salt to obtain the discount price. According to the Court, "The legislative history of the Robinson-Patman Act makes it abundantly clear that Congress considered it to be an evil that a large buyer could secure a competitive advantage over a small buyer solely because of the large buyer's quantity purchasing ability."
- In 1976, a dozen Texaco retailers in Spokane, Washington, who sued Texaco and won damages of $449,000, which were trebled under antitrust law. Texaco and other oil companies had made a practice of selling gasoline at one price to retailers and a lower price to wholesalers. When some wholesalers went into the retail business, they obtained gasoline for their retail stations at the wholesaler discount, resulting in unlawful price discrimination. The Supreme Court unanimously affirmed this decision in 1990.
- In 1994, the American Booksellers Association and independent bookstores filed a federal complaint in New York against Houghton Mifflin Company, Penguin USA, St. Martin's Press, and others, alleging that defendants had violated the Robinson–Patman Act by offering "more advantageous promotional allowances and price discounts" to "certain large national chains and buying clubs." Later, complaints were filed against Random House and Putnam Berkley Group, and these cases also were later settled with the entry of similar consent decrees. Eventually, seven publishers entered consent decrees to stop predatory pricing, and Penguin paid $25 million to independent bookstores when it continued the illegal practices. In 1998, the ABA (which represented 3,500 bookstores) and 26 individual stores filed suit in Northern California against chain stores Barnes & Noble and Borders, which had reportedly pressured publishers into offering the price advantages.

== Modern enforcement ==
Enforcement of the RPA has declined since the 1980s. In 2022, FTC commissioner Alvaro Bedoya endorsed a revival of enforcing the RPA in order to curb price discrimination. Commentators speculated that the FTC under Lina Khan would ramp up enforcement of the RPA in order to curb the unfair use of market power. In April 2024, sixteen members of Congress wrote to the FTC urging for a revival of the enforcement of the Act. In December 2024, the FTC sued liquor distributor Southern Glazer's under the Act, asserting that they charged small stores more than they charged large chains. On January 17, 2025, the closing days of the Biden Administration, the FTC filed a lawsuit against PepsiCo. In May 2025, The FTC voted to dismiss the PepsiCo suit, but the suit against Southern Glazer's is proceeding.

It has been argued that lax RPA enforcement since the 1980s has been a significant cause in the creation of rural and urban food deserts in the United States.

== See also ==
- Sherman Antitrust Act of 1890
- Clayton Antitrust Act of 1914
- Celler–Kefauver Act of 1950
- Hart–Scott–Rodino Antitrust Improvements Act of 1976
- Microeconomics
- Price skimming
