= Celler–Kefauver Act =

1950 U.S. law

- Long title: An Act to amend an Act entitled "An Act to supplement existing laws against unlawful restraints and monopolies, and for other purposes," approved October 15, 1914 (38 Stat. 730), as amended.
- Enacted by: the 81st United States Congress
- Effective: 29 December 1950

Citations
- Public law: P.L. 81-899
- Statutes at Large: 64 Stat. 1125

Codification
- Acts amended: Clayton Antitrust Act

Legislative history
- Introduced in the House as H.R. 2734 by Emanuel Celler (D-NY) on 15 February 1949; Passed the House on 15 August 1949 (223–92, 117 not voting); Passed the Senate on 13 December 1950 (55–22, 19 not voting); Signed into law by President Harry S. Truman on 29 December 1950

The Celler–Kefauver Act is a United States federal law passed in 1950 that reformed and strengthened the Clayton Antitrust Act of 1914, which had amended the Sherman Antitrust Act of 1890.

The Celler–Kefauver Act was passed to close a loophole regarding asset acquisitions and acquisitions involving firms that were not direct competitors. While the Clayton Act prohibited stock purchase mergers that resulted in reduced competition, shrewd businessmen were able to find ways around the Clayton Act simply by buying up a competitor's assets. The Celler–Kefauver Act prohibited that practice if competition would be reduced as a result of the asset acquisition.

Sometimes referred to as the Anti-Merger Act, the Celler–Kefauver Act gave the government the ability to prevent vertical mergers and conglomerate mergers which could limit competition.

== See also ==
- Hart–Scott–Rodino Antitrust Improvements Act
- United States v. Continental Can Co.
- Sherman Antitrust Act
- Robinson–Patman Act

== Bibliography ==
- Celler, Emanuel (June 1964). "The Celler-Kefauver Act and the Quest for Market Certainty". American Bar Association Journal. 50 (6): 559–560.
- "Section 7 of the Clayton Act: A Legislative History". Columbia Law Review. 52 (6): 766–781. June 1952. doi:10.2307/1119306. JSTOR 1119306.
- Handler, Milton; Robinson, Stanley D. (April 1961). "A Decade of Administration of the Celler-Kefauver Antimerger Act". Columbia Law Review. 61 (4): 629–679. doi:10.2307/1120198. JSTOR 1120198.
- Kefauver, Estes (May 1948). "Needed Changes in Legislation". The American Economic Review. 38 (2): 182–202. JSTOR 1910491.
- Miller, Richard A. (Winter 1984). "Notes on the 1984 Merger Guidelines: Clarification of the Policy or Repeal of the Celler-Kefauver Act?". The Antitrust Bulletin. 29 (4): 653–662. doi:10.1177/0003603X8402900402. S2CID 240425260.
- Mueller, Willard F. (16 October 1967). The Celler-Kefauver Act: Sixteen Years of Enforcement (Report). Staff Report to the Antitrust Subcommittee of the House Judiciary Committee. Washington, D.C.: U.S. Government Printing Office. OCLC 452803. also available as "The Celler-Kefauver Act: Sixteen Years of Enforcement". Journal of Reprints for Antitrust Law and Economics. 1 (1): 113–178. Spring 1969.
- Mueller, Willard F. (December 1978). The Celler-Kefauver Act: The First 27 Years, A Study Prepared for the Subcommittee on Monopolies and Commercial Law of the Committee on the Judiciary (Report). House of Representatives, 95th Congress, 2nd Session. Washington, D.C.: U.S. Government Printing Office. hdl:2027/mdp.39015078716704. OCLC 858843143.
- Scott, John T. (2008). "Multimarket Contacts". In Collins, Wayne D. (ed.). Issues in Competition Law and Policy, Volume II. Chicago, Ill.: American Bar Association. pp. 1, 553–1, 573. ISBN 978-1-60-442044-9. SSRN 1295487.
- Steele, Charles J. (October 1961). "A Decade of the Celler-Kefauver Anti-Merger Act". Vanderbilt Law Review. 14 (4): 1049–1083.
