= Wright Patman Lake =

Reservoir in northeast Texas in the United States

- Location within Texas Location within the United States

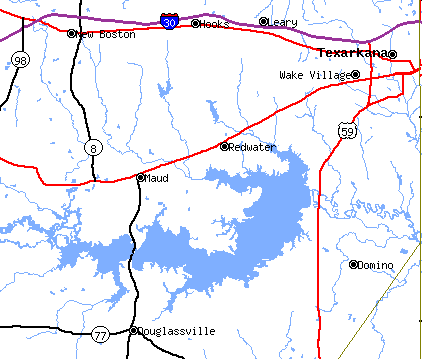
- Map
- Location: Bowie / Cass counties, Texas, United States
- Coordinates: 33°18′17″N 94°09′36″W
- Type: Flood control reservoir
- Primary inflows: Sulphur River
- Primary outflows: Sulphur River
- Basin countries: United States
- Surface area: 20,300 acres (8,200 ha)
- Max. depth: 34.6 ft (10.5 m)
- Water volume: 158,000 acre⋅ft (0.195 km^{3})
- Surface elevation: 220.6 ft (67.2 m)

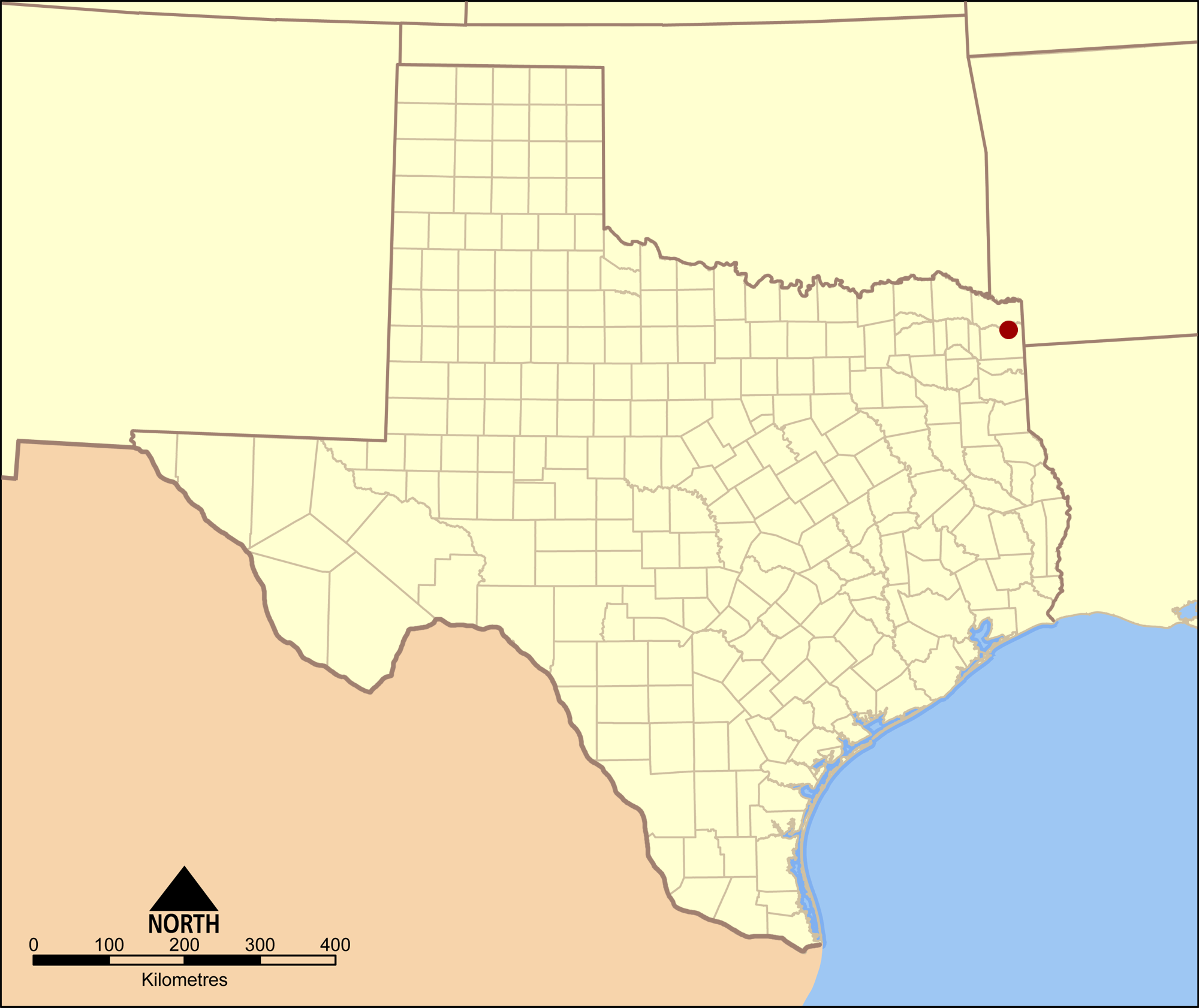
Location of the lake

Wright Patman Lake is a reservoir in northeast Texas in the United States. The lake is a U.S. Army Corps of Engineers reservoir formed on the Sulphur River in Bowie and Cass counties by Wright Patman Dam. The reservoir provides flood control and water conservation for the communities downstream from the dam. The lake is also a popular recreational destination. The Bowie County side of the lake is part of the Texarkana metropolitan area.

== Geography ==
Wright Patman Lake is located at 33°16′48″N 94°18′00″W. It is located on the border between Bowie County and Cass County, Texas, and the geographic center is about 18 miles (29 km) southwest of Texarkana, Texas and 148 miles (238 km) east of Dallas. Towns in the immediate vicinity of the lake include Redwater, Maud, and Douglassville, Texas.

The lake is formed by water impounded by Wright Patman Dam. The water is mainly from the Sulphur River, but several smaller creeks also flow into the lake. The lake's conservation pool level is 220.6 feet (67.2 m) above sea level, and the spillway level is at 259.5 feet (79.1 m) above sea level.

== History ==
Wright Patman Lake and Dam were authorized as part of the United States' Flood Contract Act of 1946. Originally known as Texarkana Reservoir, the lake was later renamed to Lake Texarkana. Construction of the dam began in 1948, and the lake was formed when water was impounded in 1953. In 1973, the lake and dam were renamed in honor of Congressman Wright Patman of Texas.

On May 16, 2020, tornadoes across the region caused a waterspout to form in the lake.

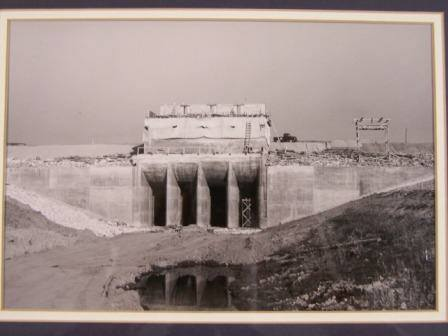
A government photo of the gates on the dam at Lake Texarkana during construction.

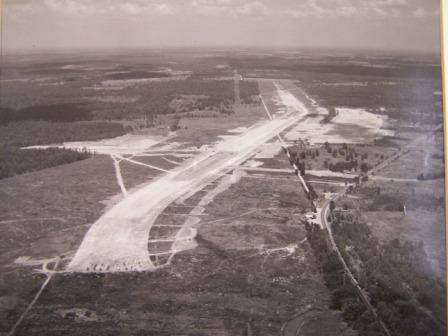
An aerial photo of the Lake Texarkana Dam during the initial phase of construction in Bowie county, Texas looking north.

== Flood protection ==
Wright Patman Lake provides flood protection for areas downstream along the Sulphur River and Red River. In the 38.9 feet (11.9 m) between its conservation pool and spillway levels, the lake can hold 2,406,000 acre-feet (2.968×10^{9} m^{3}) of flood water.

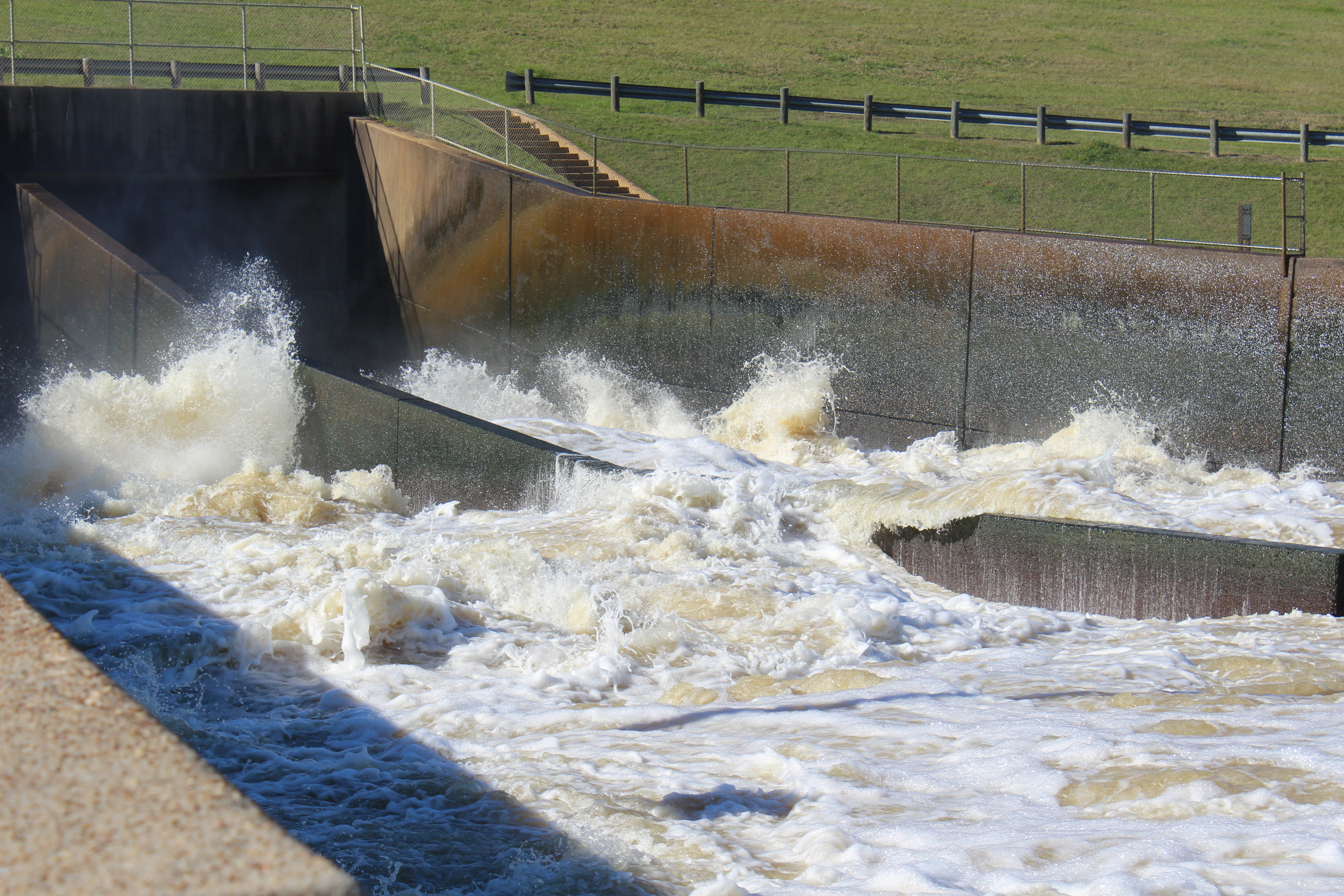
The spillway at Lake Wright Patman during the flood of 2015-2016.

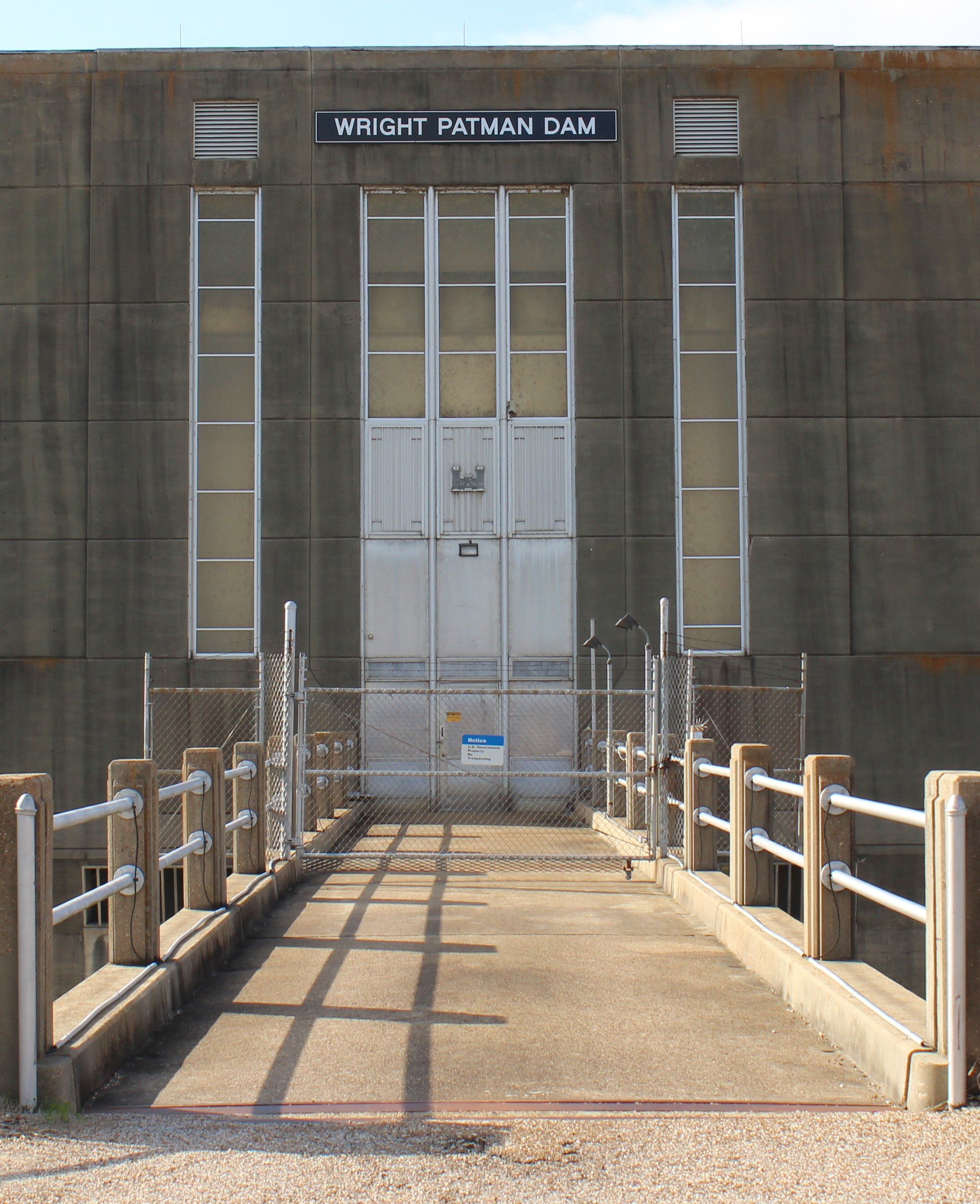
The control center for the Lake Wright Patman dam gates.

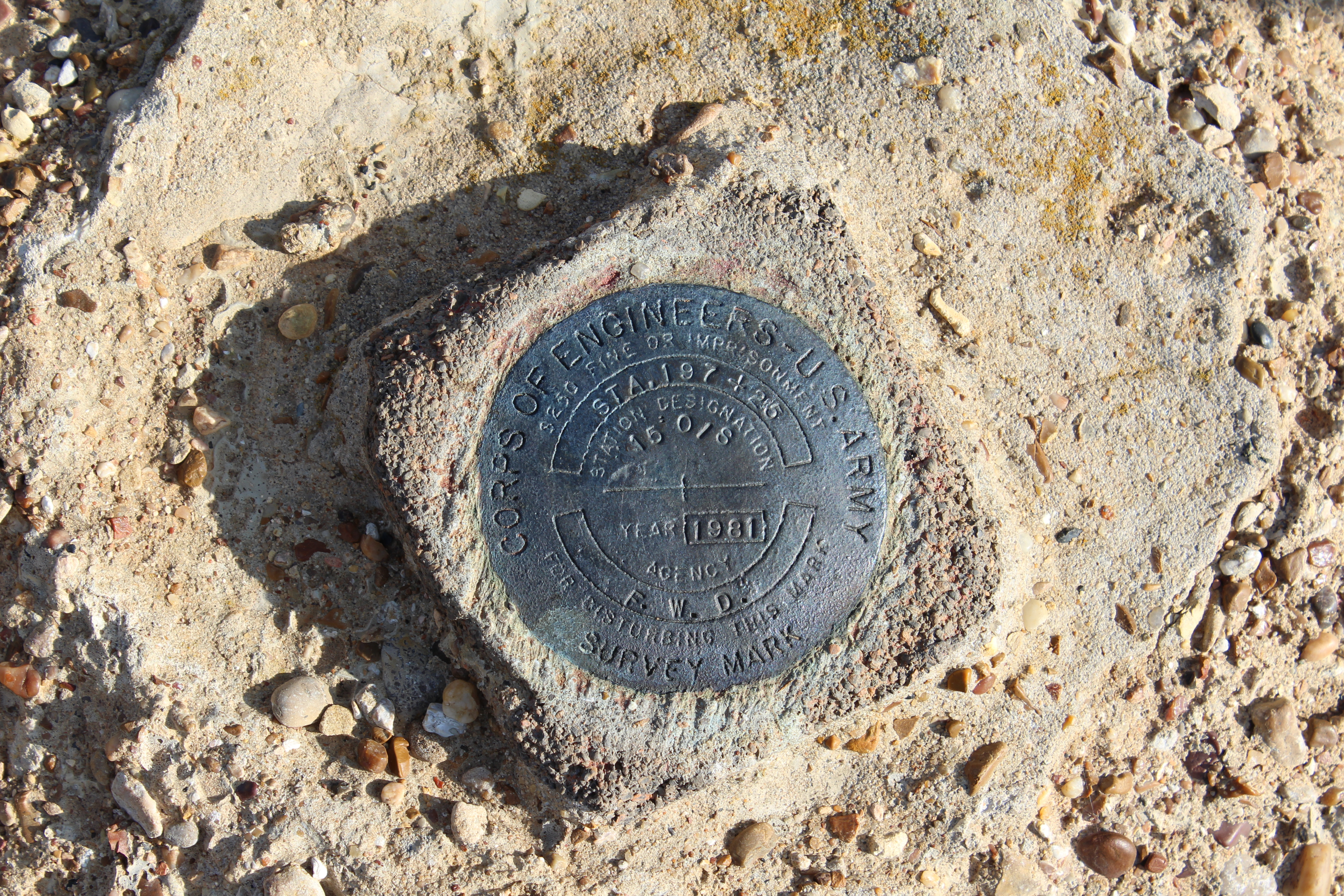
This is a brass survey marker for the Lake Wright Patman Dam installed in 1981 by the U.S. Army Corps of Engineers.

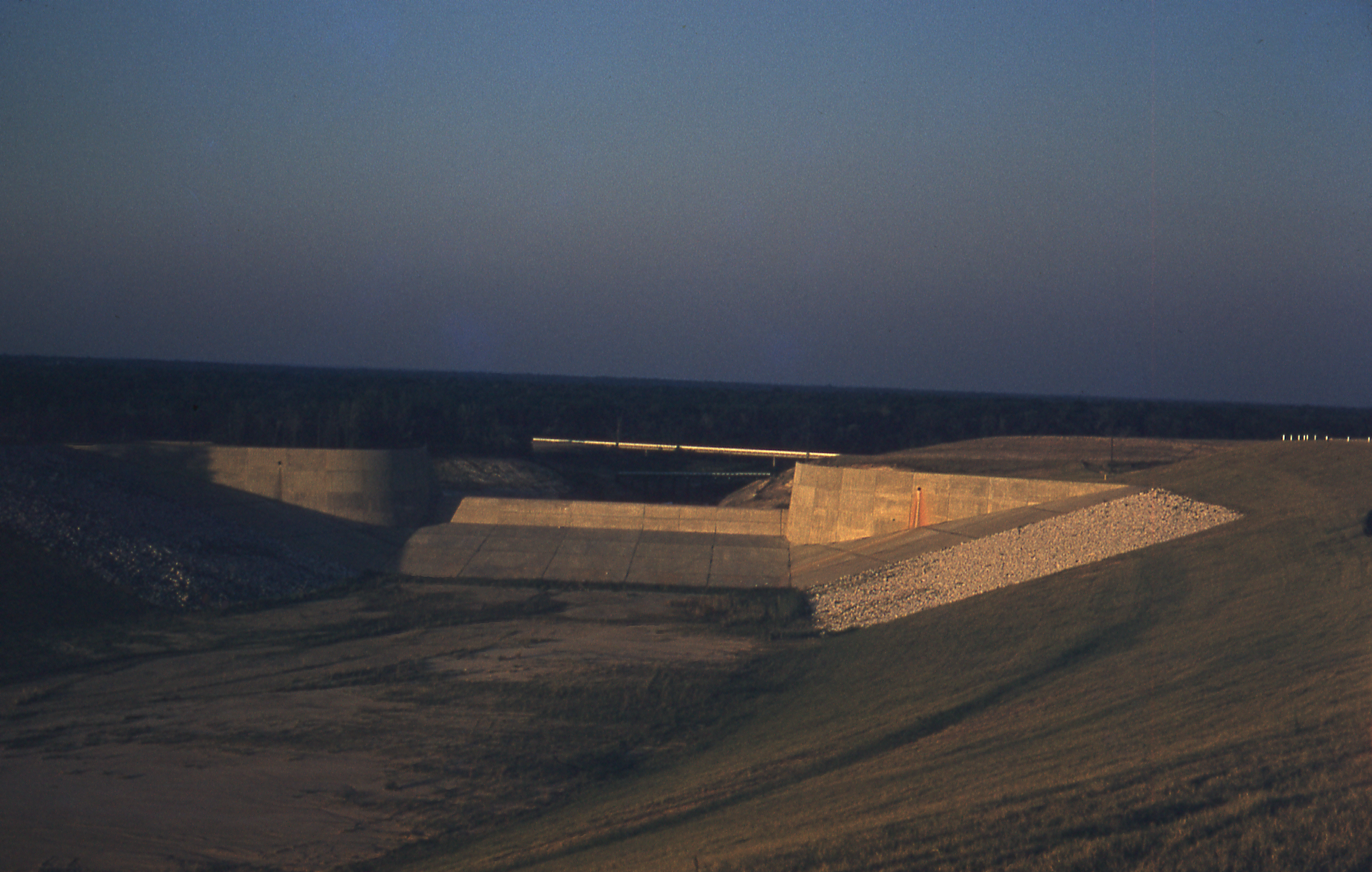
Lake Texarkana Emergency Spillway during the 1960s taken at sunset from the west side with U.S. highway 59 in the background.

== Recreation ==
The U.S. Army Corps of Engineers maintains nine parks around Wright Patman Lake. These parks provide lake access for boating, swimming, and fishing; as well as camping, picnicking, hiking, equestrian trails, and other outdoor activities. Atlanta State Park is also located on the south shore of the lake.
