= Expediting Act =

1903 US law fast-tracking antitrust cases

- Other short titles: Expediting Act of 1903 · Act of February 11, 1903
- Long title: An Act To expedite the hearing and determination of suits in equity pending or hereafter brought under the Act of July second, eighteen hundred and ninety, entitled "An Act to protect trade and commerce against unlawful restraints and monopolies," "An Act to regulate commerce," approved February fourth, eighteen hundred and eighty-seven, or any other Acts having a like purpose that may be hereafter enacted.
- Enacted by: the 57th United States Congress
- Effective: February 11, 1903

Citations
- Public law: Public Law 57-39
- Statutes at Large: 32 Stat. 823

Codification
- Acts amended: Sherman Antitrust Act · Interstate Commerce Act of 1887
- U.S.C. sections created: Former 15 U.S.C. §§ 28–29 · Former 49 U.S.C. §§ 44–45

Legislative history
- Introduced in the Senate as S. 6773 by R‑MA George Frisbie Hoarth on January 7, 1903; Committee consideration by Senate Committee on the Judiciary; Passed the Senate on February 4, 1903 (Voice vote); Passed the House on February 5, 1903 (Voice vote); Signed into law by President Theodore Roosevelt on February 11, 1903

Major amendments
- Antitrust Procedures and Penalties Act (1974)

United States Supreme Court cases
- Northern Securities Co. v. United States (1904), Standard Oil Co. of New Jersey v. United States (1911)

The Expediting Act (32 Stat. 823, 15 U.S.C. § 28, 1903-02-11) was introduced in the United States of America by President Theodore Roosevelt to break up trusts by the steel, meatpacking, oil, and railroad industries by expediting their cases to the top of the list so they could be dealt with more quickly. This act was passed in 1903.

It also added staff to the Antitrust Division of the Justice Department.

The act was used to fast-track the hearing of Standard Oil Co. of New Jersey v. United States.
