= Hart–Scott–Rodino Antitrust Improvements Act =

1976 American law

Hart–Scott–Rodino Antitrust Improvements Act of 1976
- Long title: An Act to improve and facilitate the expeditious and effective enforcement of the antitrust laws, and for other purposes
- Enacted by: the 94th United States Congress
- Effective: September 30, 1976

Citations
- Public law: Pub. L. 94–435

Legislative history
- Introduced in the House as H.R. 8532 by Peter W. Rodino (D–NJ) on July 15, 1975; Committee consideration by House Judiciary; Senate Judiciary; Passed the House on September 16, 1975 (212–210); Passed the Senate on September 8, 1976 (76–16, with amendments); Signed into law by President Gerald Ford on September 30, 1976

The Hart–Scott–Rodino Antitrust Improvements Act of 1976 (Public Law 94-435, known commonly as the HSR Act) is a set of amendments to the antitrust laws of the United States, principally the Clayton Antitrust Act. The HSR Act was signed into law by president Gerald R. Ford on September 30, 1976. The context in which the HSR Act is usually cited is 15 U.S.C. § 18a, title II of the original law. The HSR Act is named after senators Philip Hart and Hugh Scott and representative Peter W. Rodino.

The HSR Act provides that parties must not complete certain mergers, acquisitions or transfers of securities or assets, including grants of executive compensation, until they have made a detailed filing with the U.S. Federal Trade Commission and Department of Justice and waited for those agencies to determine that the transaction will not adversely affect U.S. commerce under the antitrust laws. While parties can carry out due diligence and plan for post-merger integration, they may not take any steps to integrate operations, such as an acquiring party obtaining operational control of the acquired party.

== Pre-merger notification and filing fee ==
The Act provides that before certain mergers, tender offers or other acquisition transactions (including certain grants of executive compensation) can be completed, both parties must file a "notification and report form" with the Federal Trade Commission and the Assistant Attorney General in charge of the Antitrust Division of the Department of Justice. The parties then must wait a certain period, usually 30 days (15 days for all-cash tender offers or bankruptcy sales) during which time those regulatory agencies may request further information in order to help them assess whether the proposed transaction violates the antitrust laws of the United States or could cause an anti-competitive effect in the parties' markets. The filing is not made public, but the agencies may disclose some information about the transaction, especially in the case of publicly announced transactions.

Failure to file the form carries a civil penalty of up to $41,484 per day against the parties, their officers, directors or partners, and the agencies may obtain an order requiring an acquirer to divest assets or securities acquired in violation of the Act. It is also unlawful to complete the transaction during the waiting period, and the same penalties apply. Although the waiting period is generally 30 days (15 days if the transaction is an all-cash tender offer or a bankruptcy sale), the regulators may request additional time to review additional information and the filing parties may request that the waiting period for a particular transaction be terminated early ("early termination"). Early terminations are made public in the Federal Register and posted on the Federal Trade Commission website. Some types of transactions are afforded the special treatment of shorter waiting periods.

=== When the notification is required ===
The filing requirement is triggered only if the value of the transaction and, in some cases, the size of the parties, exceeds certain dollar thresholds, which are adjusted periodically under the Act. For the purpose of determining the "size of the parties", one assesses the size of the party's ultimate parent entity and all subsidiaries of that entity. The general rule is that a filing is required if three tests are met:

(1) the transaction affects U.S. commerce;
(2) either

(a) one of the parties has annual sales or total assets of $151.7 million or more (as of 2014: in 2012 this threshold amount began increasing periodically under the law), and the other party has sales or assets of $15.2 million or more (as of 2014: this amount adjusts periodically) (where an acquired person is not engaged in manufacturing, only its total assets, not its sales, are counted, unless its sales are over $151.7 million); or
(b) the amount of stock the acquirer has is valued at $272.8 million or more (as of 2012: amount adjusts periodically) at any time; and

(3) the value of the securities or assets of the other party held by the acquirer after the transaction is $68.2 million or more (as of 2012: amount adjusts periodically). The 2018 rules raise this amount to US$84.4 million

There is also a rule prohibiting "interlocking directorates", that is, it prohibits a person from serving on the board of directors of competing companies valued at over a certain size (this amount was $27.7 million in 2012); but does not apply if the two companies have annual sales in competition with each other of less than $2.7 million.

The rules are somewhat overlapping, but all transactions where the acquiring person will hold an aggregate amount of securities and/or assets of $272.8 million or more (as of 2012) require a filing. Also, all transactions worth more than $68.2 million require a filing if one of the parties is worth at least $13.6 million, the other is worth at least $136.4 million and the total amount of assets now owned by the acquirer reaches $272.8 million. If an entity is not sure if the filing requirements apply to it, it can make a request of the Justice Department to determine if it is. Some assets are not counted, generally assets that do not produce income. For example, if one of the parties involved in the transaction is a natural person, for the purposes of determining whether they reach the asset trigger, the value of their primary residence and car are not counted, but the value of a second home that was rented out would be. There are certain exceptions on transaction reporting for usual and customary transactions: such as an airline purchasing planes and certain real estate purchases. An example was given that a merger of two corporations each having a net asset value of $99 million would not require a filing.

In transactions where either the FTC or the Antitrust Division believes there may be significant anti-competitive consequences, either agency may require that the parties submit more background information by means of the second request process.

=== Amount of the filing fee ===
The firm that is making the proposed acquisition is required to pay a substantial filing fee when making its filing; the amount of the fee is tied to the size of the transaction, as of 25 February 2016 the fee was $45,000 for transactions of at least $78.2 million but less than $156.3 million; $125,000 for transactions of $156.3 million to $781.5 million; and $280,000 for transactions over $781.5 million. The filing fee covers additional transactions, during a period of up to five years after the original transaction, that do not exceed the next threshold. There are also filing requirements based on the percentage of acquisition, at 25% of a company worth $1.36 billion, or 50% of a company where the amount held by the acquirer will be worth at least $68.2 million. However, once 50% or more of the target has been acquired, or the amount of acquisitions reported exceeded $682.1 million, no further reports are required to be filed.

== Parens patriae actions ==
Title III of the Act allows attorneys general of states to sue companies in federal court for monetary damages under antitrust laws as parens patriae, on behalf of their citizens. Previously, there was no practicable way for large numbers of individual persons harmed by such anticompetitive activities as small overcharges per person, to sue for damages; it was too costly. Congress sought to remedy that problem with this statute. Title III is in substance the original bill introduced in the House of Representatives by congressman Peter W. Rodino; the other titles of the Act were added as the bill was amended during congressional deliberations.

The effectiveness of the parens patriae provision of HSR was greatly weakened by the Supreme Court's Illinois Brick decision, which substantially limited damages relief to direct purchasers, making consumer indirect purchasers unable to sue. Accordingly, wholesalers or retailers might be able to sue in federal court in a price-fixing case, even though they passed overcharges on to ultimate consumers, but the consumer purchasers could not; yet, the parens patriae provision in HSR is directed at vindicating the right of those very victims. To some extent, however, this effect was mitigated by the availability of state law and congressional passage of the Class Action Fairness Act of 2005 (CAFA), under which class actions can be removed from state court to federal court but state parens patriae actions cannot. Consequently, state attorneys general can pursue price-fixing cases on behalf of the state's consumers under state law in state courts.

== Effectiveness ==
Peter Rodino commented in 2002 on the 25th anniversary of the legislation, "the legislation absolutely has transformed merger enforcement. Competition, as well as the consumer, has benefitted." The Federal Trade Commission's Deputy Director stated that implementation of the Act "has been instrumental in detecting transactions that have been the subject of numerous enforcement actions and [it] continues to do its job well".

== See also ==
- Merger Filing Fee Modernization Act of 2021
- United States antitrust law
