= Wright Patman =

American politician (1893–1976)

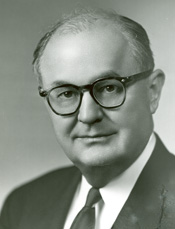

Member of the U.S. House of Representatives from Texas's 1st district
- In office March 4, 1929 – March 7, 1976
- Preceded by: Eugene Black
- Succeeded by: Sam B. Hall
House positions
40th Dean of the United States House of Representatives
In office January 3, 1973 – March 7, 1976
Preceded by	Emanuel Celler
Succeeded by	George H. Mahon
Chair of the Joint Economic Committee
In office January 3, 1973 – January 3, 1975
Preceded by	William Proxmire
Succeeded by	Hubert Humphrey
In office January 3, 1969 – January 3, 1971
Preceded by	William Proxmire
Succeeded by	William Proxmire
In office January 3, 1965 – January 3, 1967
Preceded by	Paul Douglas
Succeeded by	William Proxmire
In office January 3, 1961 – January 3, 1963
Preceded by	Paul Douglas
Succeeded by	Paul Douglas
In office January 3, 1957 – January 3, 1959
Preceded by	Paul Douglas
Succeeded by	Paul Douglas
Chair of the House Banking Committee
In office January 3, 1963 – January 3, 1975
Preceded by	Brent Spence
Succeeded by	Henry S. Reuss
Chair of the House Small Business Committee
In office January 3, 1955 – January 3, 1963
Preceded by	William S. Hill
Succeeded by	Joe L. Evins
In office January 3, 1949 – January 3, 1953
Preceded by	Walter C. Ploeser
Succeeded by	William S. Hill
Ranking Member of the House Small Business Committee
In office January 3, 1953 – January 3, 1955
Preceded by	Charles Halleck
Succeeded by	William S. Hill

Member of the Texas House of Representatives from the 2nd district
- In office January 11, 1921 – January 13, 1925
- Preceded by: J. D. Newton
- Succeeded by: George Coody

Personal details
- Born: John William Wright Patman; August 6, 1893 Hughes Springs, Texas, U.S.
- Died: March 7, 1976 (aged 82) Bethesda, Maryland, U.S.
- Party: Democratic
- Spouses: Merle Connor (m. 1919; died 1967) Pauline Tucker (m. 1968)
- Children: 4, including Bill
- Relatives: Carrin Patman (granddaughter)
- Education: Cumberland University (LLB)

Military service
- Allegiance: United States
- Branch/service: United States Army
- Years of service: 1917–1919 (active); 1919–? (Texas Army National Guard)
- Battles/wars: World War I

John William Wright Patman (August 6, 1893 – March 7, 1976) was an American politician. First elected in 1928, Patman served 24 consecutive terms in the United States House of Representatives for Texas's 1st congressional district from 1929 to 1976. He was a member of the Democratic Party. From 1973 to 1976, he was Dean of the United States House of Representatives.

Patman grew up in Hughes Springs, Texas. After graduating from Cumberland University, Patman returned to Hughes Springs to be a lawyer. From 1916 to 1917, Patman held his first political office as assistant county attorney for Cass County, Texas. He then served in the United States Army during World War I from 1917 to 1919. After the war, Patman was elected to the Texas House of Representatives in 1920. Patman served two terms in the Texas House before serving as a district attorney in Texas from 1924 to 1929.

In Congress, Patman was a fiscal watchdog who challenged practices of major banks and the Federal Reserve. He co-sponsored the Robinson-Patman Act of 1935, which was designed to protect small retail shops against competition from chain stores by fixing a minimum price for retail products. From 1963 to 1975, Patman chaired the United States House Committee on Banking and Currency. Patman served in Congress until his death in 1976. His son Bill Patman later served in a different U.S. House seat in Texas from 1981 to 1985.

== Early life ==
Patman was the son of John N. and Emma (Spurlin) Patman, born near Hughes Springs in Cass County, Texas, on August 6, 1893. After graduating from Hughes Springs High School in 1912, he enrolled in Cumberland University Law School in Lebanon, Tennessee. Receiving his law degree in 1916 he was admitted to the Texas bar the same year. During World War I Patman enlisted in the United States Army as a private. He later received a commission as a first lieutenant and machine gun officer in the Texas Army National Guard's 144th Infantry Regiment, a unit of the 36th Division. He remained in the National Guard for several years after the war.

== Political career ==
=== Early political career ===
Patman was elected to the Texas House of Representatives in 1920. He left the House in 1924 when he was appointed district attorney of the fifth judicial district of Texas.

=== Early congressional career ===
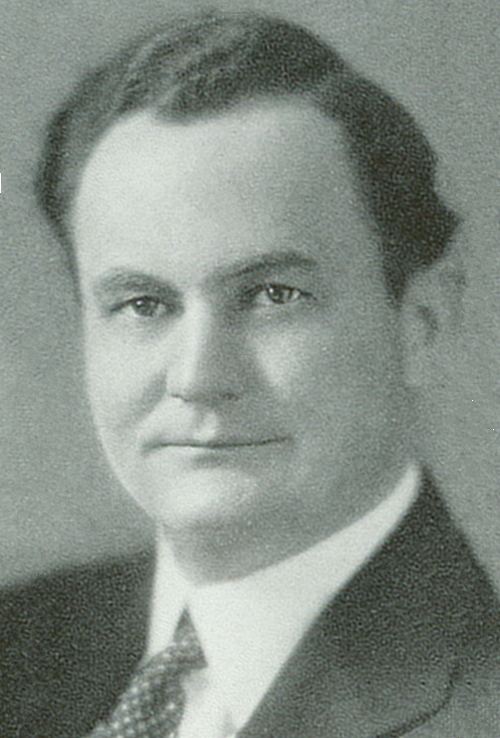
Patman as depicted in the Pictorial Directory of the 74th Congress

In 1928, Patman was elected to the House of Representatives from Texas's 1st congressional district. In 1932, Patman introduced a bill that would have mandated the immediate payment of the bonus to World War I veterans. It was during the consideration of this bill that the Bonus Army came to Washington. Patman was a supporter of the New Deal.

In January 1932, Patman spearheaded a movement to impeach Treasury Secretary Andrew Mellon, which forced the latter's resignation the following month.

In 1935, Patman took on the cause of independent retailers, who were engaged in a nationwide battle to stop the growth of chain retailing by taxing chains and restricting their business practices. Patman in the House and Joseph Taylor Robinson in the United States Senate were the sponsors of the 1936 Robinson-Patman Act, an effort to preserve independent wholesalers and retail outlets ("Mom and Pop stores") by preventing manufacturers or large retailers from becoming involved in wholesaling.

Patman was one of four members of the Texas congressional delegation to originally sign the "Southern Manifesto," a resolution in protest of the United States Supreme Court decision in Brown v. Board of Education. Patman voted against the Civil Rights Acts of 1957, the Civil Rights Acts of 1960, the Civil Rights Acts of 1964, and the Civil Rights Acts of 1968 as well as the 24th Amendment to the U.S. Constitution and the Voting Rights Act of 1965.

=== Watergate inquiry ===
Wright Patman's namesake committee played an important role in the early days of the Watergate scandal that eventually brought down the Nixon Administration.

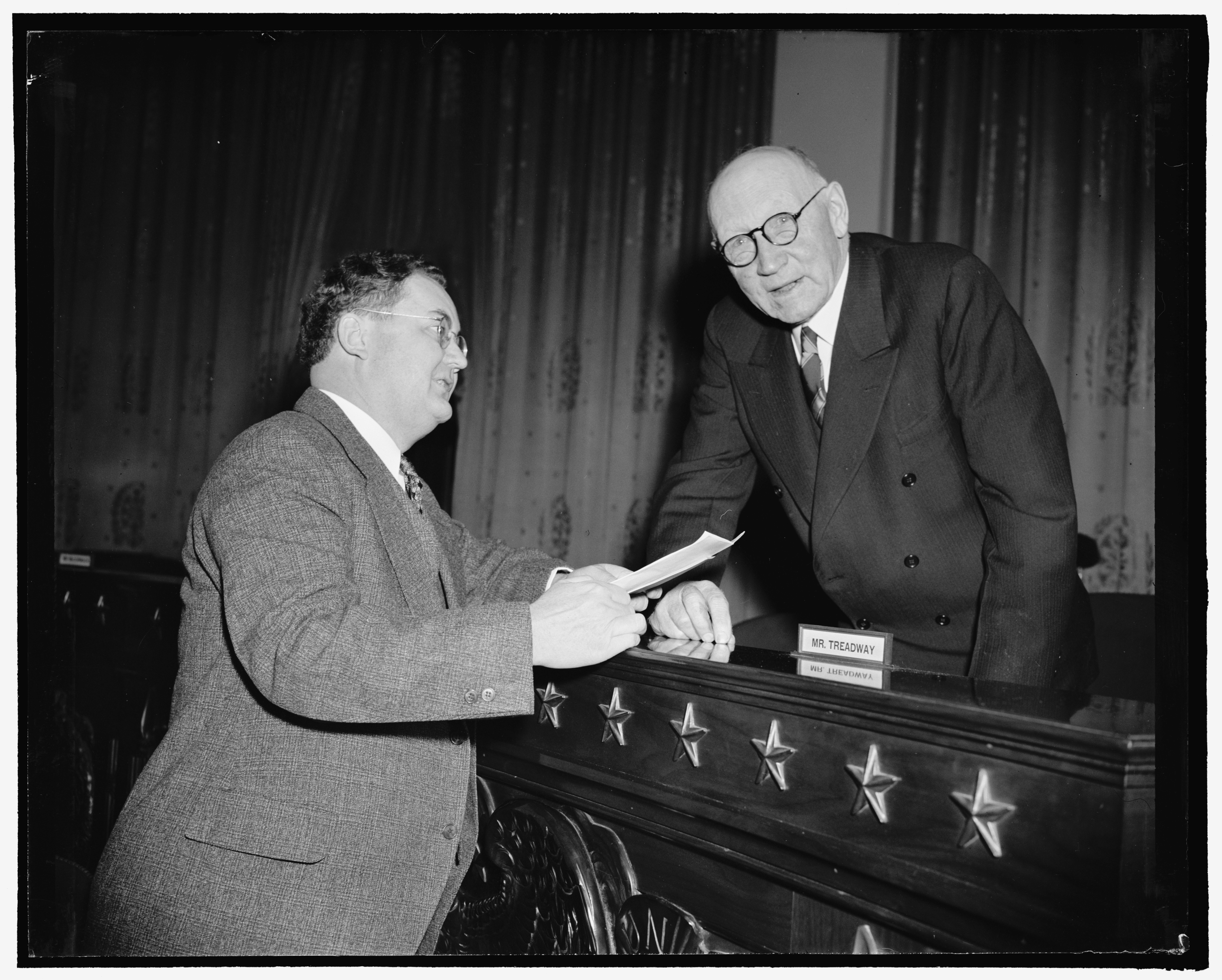
Texas Representative Wright Patman talk on his pension bill in Washington, D.C., on Feb. 3, 1939 with Robert L. Doughton, Chairman of the House Ways and Means

The Patman Committee investigated the hundred dollar bills found on the Watergate "plumbers" upon their arrest, suspecting they could directly link them to CREEP, the president's re-election committee. The Patman Committee's 1972 investigation was stymied by pressure from the White House, in part aided by Congressman Gerald R. Ford. Despite these efforts to stop Patman, The Washington Post followed up with original reporting about the money trail and helped lead to the establishment of the Senate Select Committee on Watergate in April 1973.

=== Loss of chairmanship ===
In 1975, Patman was voted out of his position as Chairman of the Banking committee by younger Congressmen, in a revolt against the 'Seniority system' which also removed Felix Edward Hébert and William R. Poage from their positions as chairmen. Patman was replaced by Henry S. Reuss by a caucus vote of 152–117. The main reason given for the caucus removing Patman was concern about his age and effectiveness.

== Personal life ==
In 1919, Patman married Merle Connor, who died in 1967. They had four children, including Bill Patman, who served in the U.S. House from 1981 to 1985. Wright Patman remarried in 1968 to Pauline Tucker.

Patman died of pneumonia in Bethesda, Maryland on March 7, 1976. He was buried at Hillcrest Cemetery in Texarkana. "His funeral in Texarkana was one of the largest, most important occurrences in the town's history," wrote Mark Stanley in a 2004 essay for the East Texas Historical Journal.

== Legacy ==
Patman is regarded as a liberal and populist who brought federal jobs and works projects to his district, where agriculture previously was the dominant economic sector. However, the left wing Americans for Democratic Action scored Patman low in its 100-point "liberal quotient" (LQ) scale, at 13 in 1972 and 24 in 1973. In contrast, the American Conservative Union rated Patman a more favorable 47 out of 100 in 1973. Despite this, according to data from the American Conservative Union, Patman had a lifetime conservative rating of only 31%

In the U.S. House of Representatives in Washington, the Wright Patman Congressional Federal Credit Union is named after him. This credit union serves the banking needs of elected and former members of the House and their staff. In addition, Wright Patman Lake and Wright Patman Dam in Northeast Texas are also named for him.

== In fiction ==
Harry Turtledove's Southern Victory series of alternate history novels features Patman as a minor character in the final volume Settling Accounts: In at the Death.

== Publications ==
- Tax Exempt Foundations and Charitable Trusts: Their Impact on Our Economy (December 1962) 87th Congress, 2nd Session
- Commercial Banks and Their Trust Activities: Emerging Influence on the American Economy (Washington DC 1968) 90th Congress, 2nd Session, volumes I and II

== See also ==
- List of members of the United States Congress who died in office (1950–1999)

== Notes ==
U.S. House of Representatives
Preceded by Eugene Black	Member of the U.S. House of Representatives from Texas's 1st congressional district 1929–1976	Succeeded by Sam B. Hall
Preceded by Walter C. Ploeser	Chair of the House Small Business Committee; 1949–1953	Succeeded by William S. Hill
Preceded by William S. Hill	Chair of the House Small Business Committee; 1955–1963	Succeeded by Joe L. Evins
Preceded by Brent Spence	Chair of the House Banking Committee; 1963–1975	Succeeded by Henry S. Reuss
Honorary titles
Preceded by Emanuel Celler	Dean of the United States House of Representatives; 1973–1976	Succeeded by George H. Mahon
