= Henry S. Ruth Jr. =

American lawyer, third Watergate prosecutor

Hank Ruth

Special Prosecutor for the United States Department of Justice
- In office October 25, 1974 – October 17, 1975
- Appointed by: William B. Saxbe
- Preceded by: Leon Jaworski
- Succeeded by: Charles Ruff

Personal details
- Born: Henry Swartley Ruth Jr. April 16, 1931 Philadelphia, Pennsylvania, U.S.
- Died: March 16, 2012 (aged 80) Tucson, Arizona, U.S.
- Party: Democratic
- Education: Yale University (BA); University of Pennsylvania (LLB)

Henry Swartley "Hank" Ruth Jr. (April 16, 1931 – March 16, 2012) was an American lawyer who served as the third special prosecutor during the Watergate Scandal. He was appointed after the October 1974 resignation of Leon Jaworski, and served until his own resignation in October 1975. He was succeeded by Charles F. Ruff.

== Early life ==
Ruth was born in Philadelphia, Pennsylvania. He was the son of Ruth Zendt and Henry Swartley Ruth, a professor of anesthesiology at Hahnemann Medical College and Hospital and pioneer of modern anesthesiology.

He attended Yale University, graduating in 1952. There, he was a member of St. Anthony Hall. He also went to the University of Pennsylvania Law School, completing his law degree in 1955.

== Career ==
After college, Ruth served as an officer in the U.S. Army Intelligence. He then spent four years as a civil defense litigator with Saul, Ewing, Remick, and Saul. He joined the United States Department of Justice in 1961, initially working in Attorney General Robert F. Kennedy's new organized crime section. He and Thomas F. McBride prosecuted racketeering cases in Berks County, Pennsylvania. Their work resulted in the indictment of Reading, Pennsylvania's mayor (John C. Kubacki) and chief of police (Charles S. Wade). In 1964, Ruth went to Mississippi to enforce the Civil Rights Act which had just been passed. Later, he was deputy director of National Crime Commission or Katzenbach Commission, a program of President Lyndon B. Johnson.

In the late 1960s, Ruth taught law at the University of Pennsylvania for two years. He then joined the National Institute of Law Enforcement and Criminal Justice, the research arm of the Justice Department, for one year. After that, he served as the criminal justice coordinator for New York City as part of the administration of Mayor John V. Lindsay. He became second in command of the Justice Department's special prosecutor's office when it was founded in May 1973, working under Archibald Cox.

=== Watergate ===
On October 20, 1973, called the Saturday Night Massacre, Cox was dismissed by President Richard Nixon after he requested recordings of White House conversations linked to the Watergate scandal. Rather than fire Cox, both attorney general Elliot Richardson and deputy attorney general Willian Ruckelshaus resigned, leaving the task to solicitor general Robert H. Bork.

That same night, FBI agents met Ruth at the entrance to the special prosecutor's office, saying it was abolished. Ruth told the FBI agents, "Let me tell you something. I'm going up there." As his co-workers gathered, Ruth "made a compact with them to remain in their offices and preserve the evidence they had." Counsel to the Senate Watergate committee, Samuel Dash said, "But for Hank Ruth, there might not have been a Watergate staff at all…"

Ruth ran the special prosecutor's office for approximately two weeks, from the October 20 firing of Cox until the November 2, 1973 appointment of Leon Jaworski. Ruth said later, "It was pretty clear to us that this act of trying to abolish our office, firing Mr. Cox, was just a straight obstruction of justice." When the Supreme Court ruled that Nixon had to turn over the tapes in July 1974, Ruth noted, "For the first time, you really had a ruling that a president of the United States is not above the law, [that] the law will prevail over a president's desire to keep something secret."

The new head of the special prosecutor's office, Jaworski, indicted many of the top officials. Nixon resigned August 9, 1974. Jaworski resigned in October, and President Gerald Ford appointed Ruth as the special prosecutor for Watergate. Ruth questioned Nixon and others about the missing 18 1/2 minutes of tape. However, he was unable to prove who had erased them. Ruth said, "In a lot of situations, people just don't talk. It wasn't as though we had a lot of cooperating witnesses in any of these matters walking into our office asking to be questioned."

In October 1975, Ruth stepped down as special prosecutor to take a position at the Urban Institute. At that time he submitted a 277-page Watergate Investigation report, stating that 55 individuals and 20 corporations had been convicted or plead guilty to date. He also concluded that President Ford's pardon Nixon was not illegal interference, but appropriate use of the presidential right to issue pardons.

=== Post-Watergate ===
Ruth became a partner of Shea & Gardner in Washington, D.C. as a criminal defense litigator. There, he managed cases for Billy Carter and Hamilton Jordon, former chief of staff for President Jimmy Carter. He was also the general counsel for the United Mine Workers Health and Retirement Funds in the late 1970s. Later, he practice law back in Philadelphia.

Ruth testified against the nomination of Robert Bork to the Supreme Court in 1987. He served on the panel investigating the 1985 MOVE bombing. In 1988, he moved to Tuscan, Arizona, but kept an affiliation with Crowell & Moring, an international law firm in Washington D.C., through 1994.

In columns in The Wall Street Journal in the 1990s, he criticized President Bill Clinton for "presidential perjury and obstruction." He wrote a book, The Challenge of Crime, with lawyer and academic Kevin Reitz in 2003.

== Personal life ==
Ruth married Christine Polk. They had three daughters: Diana Ruth, Tenley Ruth, and Laura Ruth. That marriage ended in divorce. He then married to Deborah Mathieu.

In 2012, he died in Tucson, Arizona from a stroke at the age of eighty.
