= United States v. Nixon =

1974 U.S. Supreme Court case

- Supreme Court of the United States

Argued July 8, 1974 Decided July 24, 1974
- Full case name: United States v. Richard Milhous Nixon, President of the United States, et al.
- Citations: 418 U.S. 683 (more) 94 S. Ct. 3090; 41 L. Ed. 2d 1039; 1974 U.S. LEXIS 93
- Argument: Oral argument
- Decision: Opinion

Case history
- Prior: United States v. Mitchell, 377 F. Supp. 1326 (D.D.C. 1666(; cert. before judgment to the United States Court of Appeals for the District of Columbia Cir.

Holding
- The Supreme Court does have the final voice in determining constitutional questions; no person, not even the president of the United States, is completely above the law; and the president cannot use executive privilege as an excuse to withhold evidence that is "demonstrably relevant in a criminal trial."

Court membership
- Chief Justice Warren E. Burger Associate Justices William O. Douglas · William J. Brennan Jr. Potter Stewart · Byron White; Thurgood Marshall · Harry Blackmun; Lewis F. Powell Jr. · William Rehnquist

Case opinion
- Majority: Burger, joined by Douglas, Brennan, Stewart, White, Marshall, Blackmun, Powell
- Rehnquist took no part in the consideration or decision of the case.

United States v. Nixon, 418 U.S. 683 (1974), is a landmark decision of the Supreme Court of the United States in which the Court unanimously ordered President Richard Nixon to deliver tape recordings and other subpoenaed materials related to the Watergate scandal to a federal district court. Decided on July 24, 1974, the ruling was important to the late stages of the Watergate scandal, amidst an ongoing process to impeach Richard Nixon. United States v. Nixon is considered a crucial precedent limiting the power of any U.S. president to claim executive privilege.

Chief Justice Warren E. Burger wrote the opinion for a unanimous court, joined by Justices William O. Douglas, William J. Brennan, Potter Stewart, Byron White, Thurgood Marshall, Harry Blackmun and Lewis F. Powell. Burger, Blackmun, and Powell were appointed to the Court by Nixon during his first term. Associate Justice William Rehnquist recused himself as he had previously served in the Nixon administration as an Assistant Attorney General.

== Summary ==
The case arose out of the Watergate scandal, which began during the 1972 presidential campaign between President Nixon and his Democratic challenger, Senator George McGovern of South Dakota. On June 17, 1972, about five months before the election, five men broke into Democratic National Committee headquarters located in the Watergate Office Building in Washington, D.C.; these men were later found to have ties with the Nixon administration.

In May 1973, Attorney General Elliot Richardson appointed Archibald Cox to the position of special prosecutor, charged with investigating the break-in. Later that year, on October 20, Nixon ordered that Cox be fired, precipitating the immediate departures of both Richardson and Deputy Attorney General William Ruckelshaus in what became known as the "Saturday Night Massacre". Cox's firing kindled a firestorm of protest, forcing Nixon to appoint a new special prosecutor, Leon Jaworski.

In April 1974, Jaworski obtained a subpoena ordering Nixon to release certain tapes and papers related to specific meetings between the President and those indicted by the grand jury. Those tapes and the conversations they revealed were believed to contain damaging evidence involving the indicted men and perhaps the President himself.

Hoping that Jaworski and the public would be satisfied, Nixon turned over edited transcripts of 43 conversations, including portions of 20 conversations demanded by the subpoena. James D. St. Clair, Nixon's attorney, then requested Judge John Sirica of the U.S. District Court for the District of Columbia to quash the subpoena. While arguing before Sirica, St. Clair stated that:

The President wants me to argue that he is as powerful a monarch as Louis XIV, only four years at a time, and is not subject to the processes of any court in the land except the court of impeachment.

Sirica denied Nixon's motion and ordered the President to turn the tapes over by May 31. Both Nixon and Jaworski appealed directly to the Supreme Court, which heard arguments on July 8. Nixon's attorney argued the matter should not be subject to "judicial resolution" since the matter was a dispute within the executive branch and the branch should resolve the dispute itself. Also, he claimed Special Prosecutor Jaworski had not proven the requested materials were absolutely necessary for the trial of the seven men. Besides, he claimed Nixon had an absolute executive privilege to protect communications between "high Government officials and those who advise and assist them in carrying out their duties."

== Opinion of the Court ==
Less than three weeks after oral arguments, the Court issued its decision.

On July 9, the day following oral arguments, all eight justices (Justice William H. Rehnquist recused himself due to his close association with several Watergate conspirators, including Attorneys General John Mitchell and Richard Kleindienst, prior to his appointment to the Court) indicated to each other that they would rule against the president. The justices struggled to settle on an opinion that all eight could agree to, however, with the major issue being how much of a constitutional standard could be established for what executive privilege meant.

Burger's first draft was deemed problematic and insufficient by the rest of the Court, leading the other Justices to criticize and re-write major parts of the draft. The final draft would eventually heavily incorporate Justice Blackmun's re-writing of Facts of the Case, Justice Douglas's appealability section, Justice Brennan's thoughts on standing, Justice White's standards of admissibility and relevance, and Justices Powell and Stewart's interpretation of executive privilege.

The stakes were so high, in that the tapes most likely contained evidence of criminal wrongdoing by the President and his men, that they wanted no dissent. Despite the Chief Justice's hostility to allowing the other Justices to participate in the drafting of the opinion, the final version was agreed to on July 23, the day before the decision was announced, and would contain the work of all the Justices. The Court's opinion found that the courts could indeed intervene on the matter and that Special Counsel Jaworski had proven a "sufficient likelihood that each of the tapes contains conversations relevant to the offenses charged in the indictment". While the Court acknowledged that the principle of executive privilege did exist, the Court would also directly reject President Nixon's claim to an "absolute, unqualified Presidential privilege of immunity from judicial process under all circumstances."

The Court held that a claim of Presidential privilege as to materials subpoenaed for use in a criminal trial cannot override the needs of the judicial process if that claim is based, not on the ground that military or diplomatic secrets are implicated, but merely on the ground of a generalized interest in confidentiality.

“Neither the doctrine of separation of powers nor the generalized need for confidentiality of high-level communications, without more, can sustain an absolute, unqualified Presidential privilege of immunity from judicial process under all circumstances,” Chief Justice Warren Burger wrote in the opinion.

It concluded that "when the ground for asserting privilege as to subpoenaed materials sought for use in a criminal trial is based only on the generalized interest in confidentiality, it cannot prevail over the fundamental demands of due process of law in the fair administration of criminal justice."

Nixon was then ordered to deliver the subpoenaed materials to the District Court.

Nixon resigned sixteen days later, on August 9, 1974.

== See also ==
- Presidential immunity in the United States
- Trump v. United States (2024)
