= Archibald Cox =

American prosecutor (1912–2004)

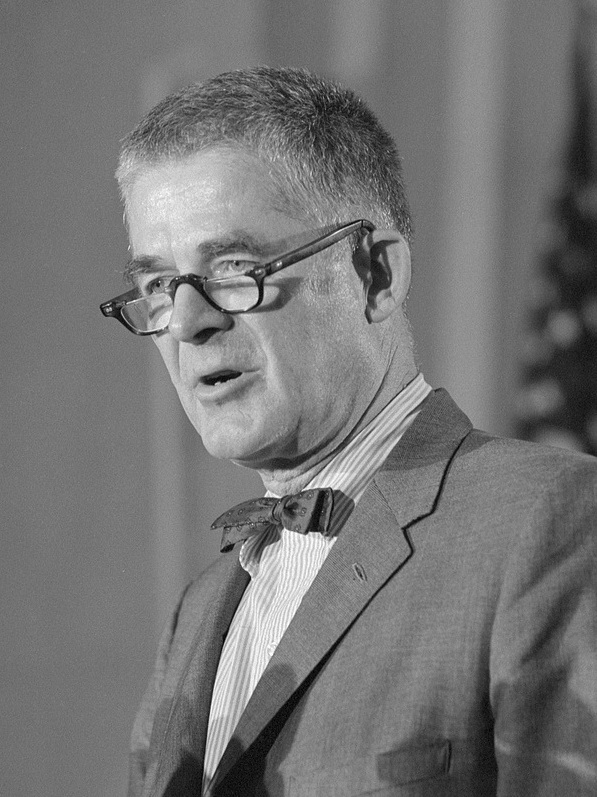
- Cox in 1973

Special Prosecutor for the United States Department of Justice
- In office May 18, 1973 – October 20, 1973
- Appointed by: Elliot Richardson
- Deputy: Henry Ruth Jr.
- Preceded by: Newbold Morris (1953)
- Succeeded by: Leon Jaworski

31st Solicitor General of the United States
- In office January 24, 1961 – July 31, 1965
- President: John F. Kennedy; Lyndon B. Johnson
- Preceded by: J. Lee Rankin
- Succeeded by: Thurgood Marshall

Personal details
- Born: May 17, 1912 Plainfield, New Jersey, U.S.
- Died: May 29, 2004 (aged 92) Brooksville, Maine, U.S.
- Party: Democratic
- Spouse: Phyllis Ames (m. 1937)
- Children: 3
- Education: Harvard University (AB, LLB)

Archibald Cox Jr. (May 17, 1912 – May 29, 2004) was an American legal scholar who served as U.S. Solicitor General under President John F. Kennedy and as a special prosecutor during the Watergate scandal. During his career, he was a pioneering expert on labor law and was also an authority on constitutional law. The Journal of Legal Studies has identified Cox as one of the most cited legal scholars of the 20th century.

Cox was Senator John F. Kennedy's labor advisor and in 1961, President Kennedy appointed him solicitor general, an office he held for four and a half years. Cox became famous when, under mounting pressure and charges of corruption against persons closely associated with Richard Nixon, Attorney General nominee Elliot Richardson appointed him as Special Prosecutor to oversee the federal criminal investigation into the Watergate burglary and other related crimes that became popularly known as the Watergate scandal. He had a dramatic confrontation with Nixon when he subpoenaed the tapes the president had secretly recorded of his Oval Office conversations. When Cox refused a direct order from the White House to seek no further tapes or presidential materials, Nixon fired him in an incident that became known as the Saturday Night Massacre. Cox's firing produced a public relations disaster for Nixon and set in motion impeachment proceedings which ended with Nixon stepping down from the presidency.

Cox returned to teaching, lecturing, and writing for the rest of his life, giving his opinions on the role of the Supreme Court in the development of the law and the role of the lawyer in society. Although he was recommended to President Jimmy Carter for a seat on the First Circuit Court of Appeals, Cox's nomination fell victim to the dispute between the president and Senator Ted Kennedy. He was appointed to head several public-service, watchdog and good-government organizations, including serving for 12 years (1980–1992) as Chairman of Common Cause. In addition, he argued two important Supreme Court cases, winning both in part: one concerning the constitutionality of federal campaign finance restrictions (Buckley v. Valeo) and the other the leading early case testing affirmative action (Regents of the University of California v. Bakke).

== Early life, education and private practice ==
=== Family and ancestors ===
Cox was born in Plainfield, New Jersey in 1912, the son of Archibald and Frances "Fanny" Bruen Perkins Cox, the eldest of seven children. (Note: Cox's siblings were: Elizabeth "Betty" (born 1913), Mary "Molly" (1916), Robert (1919), Maxwell (1922), Louis (1924) and Rowland (1928).) His father Archibald Sr. (Harvard College, 1896; Harvard Law School, 1899) was the son of a Manhattan lawyer, Rowland Cox, and rose to prominence as a patent and trademark lawyer, and who wrote Cox's Manual on Trade Marks. (Note: See Gormley 1997, p. 4. The volume edited by Cox's grandfather was: Cox, Rowland (1871). American Trade Mark Cases: A Compilation of All the Reported Trade Mark Cases Decided in the American Courts prior to the year 1871. With an Appendix Containing the Leading English Cases …. Cincinnati: R. Clarke.) When Rowland Cox died suddenly in 1900, Archibald Sr. inherited his father's solo practice almost right out of law school. He built on that start to become successful in his own right. His most prominent achievement was securing the red cross as the trademark of Johnson & Johnson. Compared to the lawyers on his mother's side, his father (as Archibald Jr. reflected late in his life) did not participate much in public service, although he had "done a few things for Woodrow Wilson … at the time of the peace conference" and was president of the local Board of Education. He also served as a member of the New Jersey Rapid Transit Commission.

=== Education ===
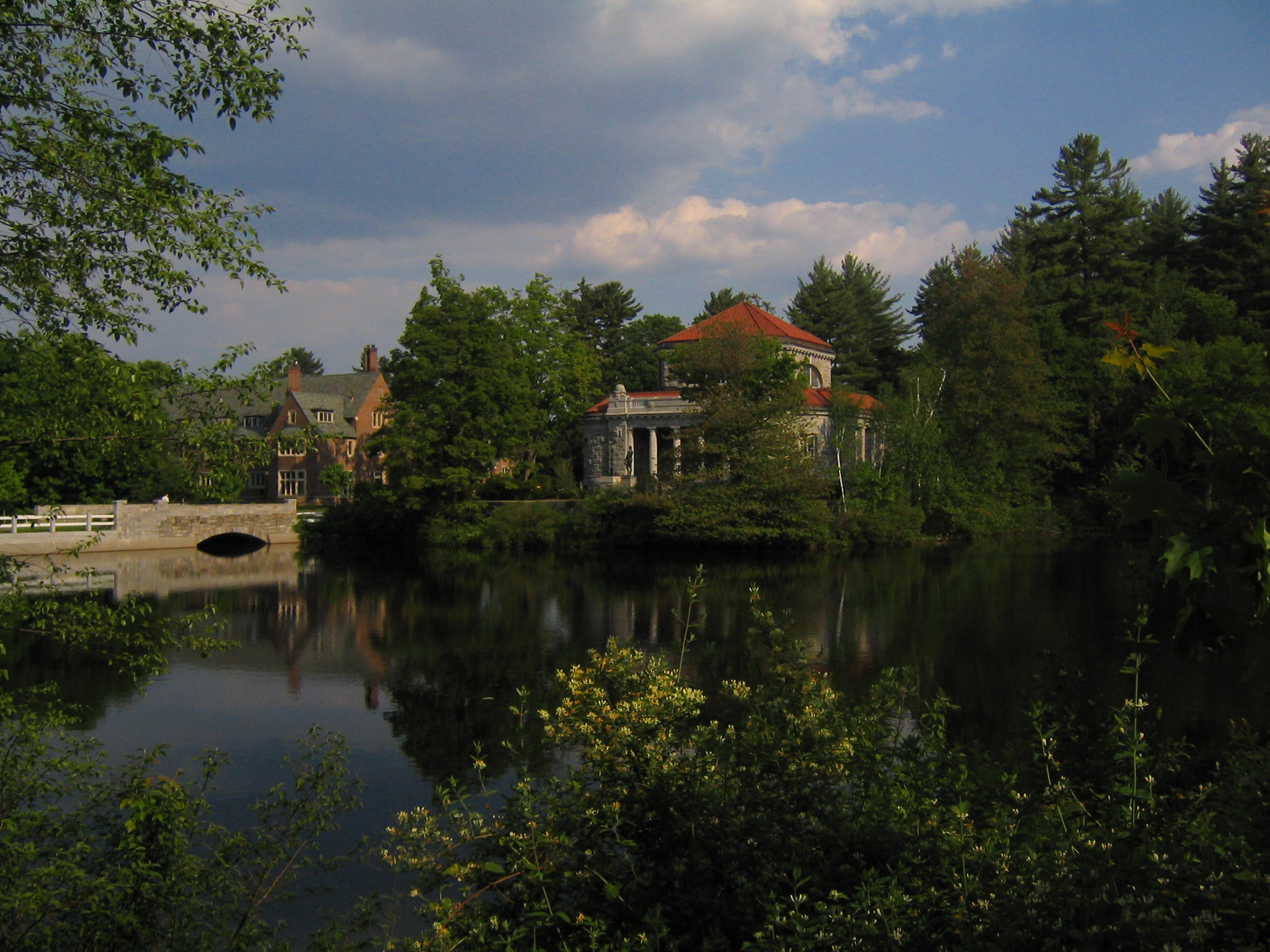
The library at St. Paul's School in New Hampshire

Cox attended the private Wardlaw School, then located in Plainfield, New Jersey, until he was fourteen. Afterwards, he studied at St. Paul's School in New Hampshire, attending due to his father's intervention on his behalf despite low grades.

Cox thrived at St. Paul and in his final year, he won the Hugh Camp Memorial Cup for public speaking and led the school's debate team to defeat Groton. It was during this period that he read Beveridge's Life of John Marshall, which was an important early ingredient in Cox's progressive view of the law. With a warm recommendation from the head-master (and family connections), Cox was able to enter Harvard College in 1930.

==== College ====
At Harvard, Cox joined a final club, the Delphic Club, called the "Gashouse" for its parties, gambling and liquor (during Prohibition). He majored in history, government and economics and did slightly better than "gentlemanly Cs."

It was during the second semester of his freshman year that his father died, at age 56. For Cox's senior thesis he proposed analyzing the constitutional differences of the composition between the Senate and House of Representatives through early American history. His advisor, Paul Buck, told him he did not "have brains enough" for the project. Cox took up the challenge and completed Senatorial Saucer. (Note: The title of the paper referred to Jefferson's explanation to the French of the function of the Senate: just as pouring tea into a saucer cools it, so legislation coming from the House ("hot" because of the populist composition of that body) is cooled in the Senate (which is less populist because they are appointed by the states rather than elected by the people). One aspect of the research that would later relate to Cox's most famous episode was the impeachment and acquittal of Supreme Court Justice Samuel Chase in 1803. Chase was the first nationally known official to be impeached by the House.) As a result of the work Cox was able to graduate with honors in History. Cox continued on to Harvard Law School in 1934.

==== Law school ====
Cox thrived at law school, ranking first in his class of 593 at the end of his first year. Cox's second year was taken up with work on the Harvard Law Review. He also met his future wife Phyllis Ames. Cox proposed to her after only three or four meetings. She initially put him off, but by March 1936 they were engaged. Phyllis, who graduated Smith the year before, was the granddaughter of James Barr Ames, one time dean of Harvard Law School and noted for popularizing the casebook method of legal study. Professor (and later United States Associate Justice) Felix Frankfurter wrote them a congratulatory note on their betrothal, which exclaimed: "My God, what a powerful legal combination!" Cox graduated in 1937 magna cum laude, one of nine receiving the highest honor awarded by the law school that year. Two weeks before his commencement, Cox and Phyllis married. Moving to New York City after law school, Cox served as a clerk with United States District Court Judge Learned Hand.

=== Private practice and wartime service ===
After a year in New York City, Cox accepted an associate position with the Boston law firm of Ropes, Gray, Best, Coolidge and Rugg. After World War II began, Cox took a position in the United States Solicitor General's office. By 1943, Cox had advanced to become Assistant Solicitor of the Labor Department.

==== Solicitor in the Labor Department ====
As associate solicitor, Cox's job in the Labor Department was to supervise enforcement at the District Court level of federal labor statutes. Cox had a staff of eight lawyers in Washington and supervised the department's regional offices, including deciding when a regional attorney could bring suit. Most of the litigation involved wage and hours issues under the Fair Labor Standards Act. His background in the solicitor general's office also allowed him to handle much of the appellate work. By virtue of his position, Cox also occasionally sat as an alternative public member of the Wage Adjustment Board, which dealt with the construction industry and attempted to maintain labor peace by mediating non-wage disputes and setting prevailing wage rates and increases under the Davis–Bacon Act.

=== Harvard faculty and labor arbitrator ===
After WWII was over, Cox returned to the law firm Ropes, Gray with the intention of spending his professional career there. Instead, he lasted five weeks. Dean Landis of the Harvard Law School offered to hire Cox as a probationary teacher in the fall of 1945. Cox accepted, despite the substantial cut in salary he would take, but on the condition that he would not have to teach corporations or property. Landis agreed; his expectation was that Cox should become a nationally recognized expert in labor law. In addition to labor law, Cox started out teaching torts. Later he would also teach unfair competition, agency and administrative law. He was made a permanent professor during the 1946–47 academic year, a time when the law school greatly increased enrollment in the post-war boom.

As a legal scholar and professor at Harvard throughout the 1950s, Cox became immensely influential in the labor field. His writing was so prolific that Dean Griswold pointed to Cox when he needed an example of the kind of academic output he was seeking from the faculty. Given that the peak of his academic career also coincided with the enactment of the statutes that defined industrial relations, his work, usually the first on any new topic, shaped the Supreme Court's thinking. His one-time student and later colleague Derek Bok described this influence:

In the 1950s, the National Labor Relations Act was still relatively new, and the Taft-Hartley Act was in its infancy. Over the decade, the Supreme Court had a series of opportunities to clarify the meaning of good faith bargaining, the scope of mandatory arbitration, the legal status of arbitration, and other important issues of policy left open by Congress. In case after case, when the majority reached the critical point of decision, the justices would rely on one of Archie's articles.

In addition to his direct effect on Supreme Court decisions, Cox's scholarly writing influenced other academics and practitioners who widely cited him. The Journal of Legal Studies lists Cox as one of the most-cited legal scholars of the twentieth century. The framework he developed, first in the two articles with Dunlop in 1950–51, then elaborated on his own, became the standard view of the Wagner and Taft-Hartley Acts. It assumed roughly equal bargaining power between union and management and interpreted the labor laws (often contrary to the language of the statutes themselves) to limit individual employee rights unless pursued by his bargaining agent, to restrict the subjects on which management is required to bargain based on past practices, to permit unions to waive rights the statutes otherwise gave to employees and in general to advocate the notion that labor statutes should be interpreted to promote industrial peace over enhancing the economic power of labor. The framework remained the dominant view of federal labor relations until the late 1950s when concerns over member participation began to shape policy. It would be Cox and his work with Senator John F. Kennedy on the bill that became the Landrum–Griffin Act that would initiate the new framework.

== Advisor to Senator Kennedy and role in the Kennedy administration ==
=== Kennedy advisor, then partisan ===
==== Kennedy's labor expert ====
In 1953 the young and ambitious John F. Kennedy, new to the Senate, decided that labor relations would be the area that he would specialize in to begin building a policy and legislative resume for use in future political endeavors. He wrote to Cox in March 1953 inviting him to testify before the Senate Committee on Labor and Public Welfare. Cox was a natural ally to seek out. He was one of Kennedy's constituents and a fellow Harvard alumnus. More importantly, he was a nationally recognized academic expert on labor law and a liberal Democrat (Note: Professor Cox in 2000 was not certain when he had registered as a Democrat. He thought it "may have just been in connection with working with Kennedy and thinking it would be well advised." He once revealed that he had voted in an election for Democrat Adlai Stevenson for president, Republicans Henry Cabot Lodge Jr. for Senator and Christian Herter for Governor. Lodge's opponent in that race was John F. Kennedy.) with a predisposition towards labor.

In the fall of 1959, after the work on the Landrum–Griffin Act had wound up, Kennedy confided to Cox that he was running for president. In January 1960, he wrote Cox formally asking him to head up his efforts to "tap intellectual talent in the Cambridge area" and then "ride herd over twenty or thirty college professors" in their activities for him. (Note: Abram Chayes claimed that it was his idea to select Cox for this purpose and so told Sorensen "a couple of months" before 1960. Much as he did with the informal group of advisors whom Cox recruited and led for the initial advice on the McClellan Hearings, Kennedy never made explicit what activities he wanted the group to perform, although he was clear to both Cox and those experts he met that he did not expect them to consider political implications in delivering their opinion on sound policy. Cox later found out that the position had been originally offered to Harvard law professor Mark Howe, who turned it down, thinking he was not suited for the role, and recommended Cox.) Cox brought a number of eminent policy experts in a number of fields into contact with Kennedy. Although many were skeptical of his candidacy and some had been loyal to or inclined towards either Adlai Stevenson or Hubert Humphrey, Kennedy won them over at a meeting in Boston's Harvard Club on January 24. (Note: See Gormley 1997, p. 116. The attendees included, from MIT: Jerome Wiesner, Walt W. Rostow, Paul Samuelson, Lucian Pye and Walter A. Rosenblith; from Harvard Law School: Mark Howe, Paul Freund and Abram Chayes; and from Brandeis: Edward L. Katzenbach, Jr.) In the period leading up to the Democratic Convention in July, Cox acted mainly as a "stimulator" to prod various academics to send memoranda to Kennedy or to find academics to supply Kennedy with policy positions on specific topics. While before the Convention, Cox had not recruited extensively beyond the Boston area, he had at least one recruit from the University of Colorado and recruited from Stanford. as well. Even though the number was not large before the nomination, no other Democratic contender, not even Stevenson, had made an effort to recruit intellectual partisans.

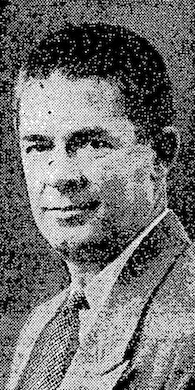
Archibald Cox in April 1960

As with the case of Cox's informal group of labor advisors, Kennedy was anxious to use Cox's contacts not only for their expertise but also for the éclat they gave his campaign. A Congressional Quarterly article in April, widely reprinted in local papers, named Cox and the other Cambridge advisors as a key to the kinds of policies Kennedy would advocate. "Of John F. Kennedy's political talents none has been more helpful to him than his ability to attract capable men to his cause," the Times said in the middle of the convention. The description of Cox's academic advisers was designed to recall Roosevelt's "Brain Trusts": "More ideas poured in from Cambridge, Mass., where an astounding galaxy of scholars had made themselves an informal brain-trust for Senator Kennedy."

After the Los Angeles Convention Kennedy, now the nominee, asked Cox to move to Washington to have an expanded role, hiring speechwriters and coordinating academic talent. Cox accepted, and then Kennedy point blank asked Cox if he thought he could get along with Ted Sorensen and explained "Sorensen's fear that somebody was going to elbow his way in between him and Kennedy." Cox assumed he could. Cox had been unaware that Sorensen had already been at work, back in February, trying to compartmentalize and minimize Cox' group's efforts. Sorensen told Joseph A. Loftus of the Times that the Cambridge group was "something 'much more talked about than fact.'" Cox would soon discover, however, that Sorensen always "was terribly worried about being cut out" and protected Kennedy from independent advice, including Cox'.

=== Solicitor General of the United States ===
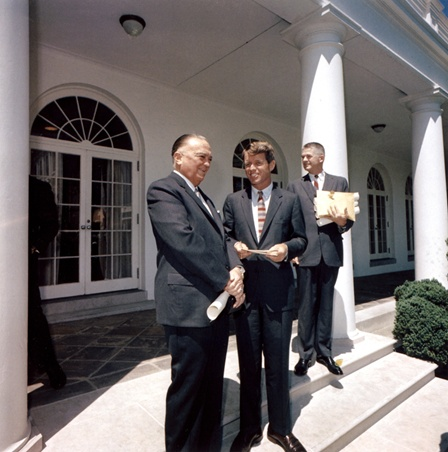
FBI Director J. Edgar Hoover, Attorney General Robert F. Kennedy and Solicitor General Archibald Cox in the White House Rose Garden on May 7, 1963.

After Kennedy's election in 1960, despite publicly downplaying the idea that he was being considered for public office, Cox was concerned he might be offered a seat on the NLRB or a second echelon position in the Department of Labor. Neither position offered new challenges for him, but he worried about the propriety of refusing. Before leaving for his family Christmas celebration in Windsor, Cox was tipped off by Anthony Lewis of the Times that he had been chosen for Solicitor General. Cox decided that if this was true, he would tell the president-elect that he needed time to think the matter over. But when Kennedy called, interrupting a family lunch, he accepted immediately. Cox was unaware until much later that his law school colleague, Paul Freund, whom he had recommended for the position, declined and recommended Cox in turn. Next month, Cox appeared before the Senate Judicial Committee for confirmation hearings, but his reputation was such that the hearing took only ten minutes; even minority leader Dirksen, who knew Cox from Landrum–Griffin days, said he "had been quite impressed with his legal abilities … ."

In the nearly century-long period that the office had existed before Cox occupied it, the solicitor general, as the government's lawyer before the Supreme Court, was immensely influential. Cox held the position at a time when the Warren Court was about to involve the Court in issues never before considered appropriate for judicial review, at a time when the country was ready for the Court to decide various questions of social justice and individual rights. Cox was aware of the pivotal time the Court and he faced and explained it in an address right before the beginning of the first full Term he would argue in:

[A]n extraordinarily large proportion of the most fundamental issues of our times ultimately go before the Supreme Court for judicial determination. They are the issues upon which the community, consciously or unconsciously, is most deeply divided. They arouse the deepest emotions. Their resolution—one way or the other often writes our future history. … Perhaps it is an exaggeration to suggest that in the United States we have developed an extraordinary facility for casting social, economic, philosophical, and political questions in the form of actions at law and suits in equity, and then turning around and having the courts decide them upon social, economic, and philosophical grounds. It is plainly true that we put upon the Supreme Court the burden of deciding cases that would never come before the judicial branch in any other country.

==== Civil rights and sit-in cases ====
During the customary introduction of the Solicitor General to the members of the Court, Justice Frankfurter had an extended talk with his former student. The justice advised Cox that the first case to argue should be something involving criminal law. Cox gave due weight to the recommendation, but he met vigorous objections from his assistant Oscar Davis, who argued that civil rights was the most important legal issue facing the country and that Cox should signal in his first argued case the new administration's commitment to fight for it. Cox agreed and selected Burton v. Wilmington Parking Authority. The case, brought by an African-American who was barred from a private restaurant that rented space in a building owned by the state of Delaware, confronted the Court squarely with the limitations on the Fourteenth Amendment guarantee of "equal protection of the laws" – erected by the so-called Civil Rights Cases of 1883, which held that the constitutional guarantee only applied against "state action." Cox persuaded the Court that the fact that the business was a state lessee as well as franchisee, was located in a parking complex developed by the state to promote business, and that the complex flew a Delaware flag in front of the building, all rendered the state a "joint participant" with the restaurant, sufficient to invoke the Fourteenth Amendment. The Court agreed. It was the beginning of the Court's dilution of the "state action" requirement in racial discrimination cases.

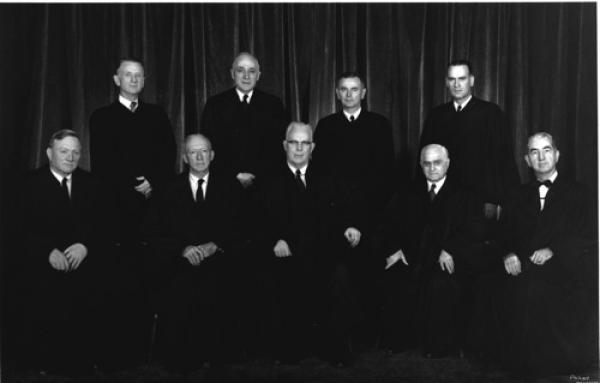
The Supreme Court as it was composed from October 13, 1958, to March 26, 1962. Top (l-r): Charles E. Whittaker, John M. Harlan, William J. Brennan, Jr., Potter Stewart. Bottom (l-r): William O. Douglas, Hugo L. Black, Earl Warren, Felix Frankfurter, Tom C. Clark.

By May 1961, the civil rights movement, led by James Farmer of CORE, initiated what would become a wave of non-violent confrontations against discrimination in public transit and other accommodations. The attorney general's office, under the personal supervision of Robert Kennedy, took active measures to protect the protestors in the face of local political and police indifference to or active complicity with violent resisters. Cox was regularly involved in meetings over day-to-day Justice Department activities, while at the same time he prepared to argue cases seeking to overturn state court convictions of civil rights protestors (under various statutes dealing with vagrancy, trespass and even parading without a permit.) Cox came into close contact with Robert Kennedy, and while the two had vastly different styles (Kennedy was impulsive and somewhat cavalier of legal principles; Cox was cautious against making missteps that would set the movement back or commit the Court to a position on which it might lose its legitimacy), Cox grew to admire Kennedy. Prior to the Ole Miss riot the subject reluctantly gave counsel to the President. Impatient of a piecemeal approach, Robert Kennedy, but more importantly the civil rights community and particularly Jack Greenberg of the NAACP Legal Defense Fund, sought near elimination of the "state action" doctrine, arguing that restaurants were like "common carriers", subject to the Fourteenth Amendment or that the mere act of enforcing a trespass law, used to further private discrimination, was itself sufficient "state action." (Note: The former argument found some support in Boynton v. Virginia, 364 U.S. 454 (1960), which vacated a trespass conviction of an African American eating in a "whites only" facility of a bus station. But that decision was based on the Interstate Commerce Act, which banned segregation (and itself was based on the Commerce Clause and not the Fourteenth Amendment). The second theory had some support in Shelley v. Kraemer, 334 U.S. 1 (1948), which made racially discriminatory real estate covenants illegal on the ground that court enforcement of them sufficiently intertwined the state in private discrimination as to amount to "state action." The arguments pressed on Cox, however, went well beyond those precedents in Cox' opinion, however much he agreed with the policy outcome.)

Cox did not believe the Court would make so radical a break with eighty-year-old precedent, so in each case he argued on narrow grounds that did not require the Court to overrule the Civil Rights Cases, and each case he won on those grounds, in the process infuriating Jack Greenberg, who was arguing in those very cases for the broader approach. The cautious approach, however, garnered Cox much credibility with the Court, which came to realize that he was not going to lead them into areas with uncertain future consequences. After a number of these cases, however, even the Court requested briefing in 1962 on the "state action" doctrine in Bell v. Maryland. Cox took a slightly more advanced position, arguing that where trespass laws were used to prosecute civil rights demonstrators in states such as Maryland, where there was a history of racial segregation by custom and law, then the discrimination was part of the enforcement sufficient to invoke state action. Although even this position disappointed civil rights activists and the Justice Department, it prevailed, but in the face of three dissents (including that of Justice Black), suggesting that a broader rule might have been rejected by a majority. The issue would be mooted by legislation dealing with "public accommodations", which Cox helped draft and defended before the Court in 1965.

==== Reapportionment cases ====
The cases that troubled Cox the most during his tenure, and the area where he differed widest from Robert Kennedy, involved malapportionment of voting districts. Over the years failure to re-allocate voting districts particularly in state legislatures, produced wildly disproportionate districts, with rural areas having many fewer voters than urban districts as a result of the urbanization of America. (Note: In 1962 more than half the states had failed to re-apportion legislative districts for more than a quarter of a century.) The result was dilution of the urban vote with policy resulting accordingly; rectification would benefit Democrats politically, while malapportionment stood as an obstacle to legislation that improved the lot of city-dwellers, minorities and the poor. The problem was that Justice Frankfurter had written in a plurality decision in 1946 that such issues amounted to a political question—a matter not appropriate for the Court to resolve. (Note: Frankfurter's decision in Colegrove v. Green, 328 U.S. 549 (1946), was joined in by only two other justices. The two others making the majority decided on other grounds.) On the other hand, given that political interests were entrenched, and those with disproportionate power were not likely to give up their greater share, a political solution was unlikely. But a case surfaced from Tennessee that seemed ideal to test that ruling. Tennessee had not reapportioned its legislature since 1910 and, as a result, there were urban districts that had eleven times the citizens of rural districts. Cox decided to submit an amicus curiae brief supporting the plaintiffs in Baker v. Carr. The case was argued once in April 1961 and re-argued in October. In between Cox was subjected to an unpleasant onslaught by Frankfurter at a public dinner and relentless questions in the October argument. When the decision was announced, however, Frankfurter was joined by only Harlan; the result was 6–2.

The first case proved far easier than Cox expected. (Note: It also became, to Warren's mind on his retirement, the single most important contribution to Constitutional law during his tenure: "I think Baker v. Carr was the most important case that we decided in my time, because that gave to the courts the power to determine whether or not we were to have fair representation in our governmental system, and Reynolds v. Simms [377 U.S. 533 (1964)] was merely the application of that principle.") The holding was relatively narrow, simply providing federal court jurisdiction, and followed the points in Cox's brief. But Cox had much more difficulty with the follow-up cases, because he could not persuade himself that history or legal theory would demand a one-man-one-vote standard in all cases. He developed what he later called a "highly complex set of criteria," but in the end when the Court finally erected the one-man-one-vote standard it simply made the general rule subject to all the exceptions that Cox had tried to weave into his proposed standards. As Chief Justice Warren's clerk later told him "all the Chief did was take your brief and turn it upside down and write exceptions to the one-person one-vote that covered all the cases that you had attempted to exclude by this complicated formula.". The case was Reynolds v. Sims, 377 U.S. 533 (1964), holding that election districts must be roughly proportional to population.

==== After Kennedy ====
According to columnist William V. Shannon, President Kennedy had planned to appoint Cox to the next opening on the Supreme Court. After Kennedy's assassination, Deputy Attorney General Nicholas Katzenbach became Cox's direct superior. The first request of the acting Attorney General was that Cox accompany him to see the chief justice and request him to head a commission to investigate the circumstances surrounding the assassination of President Kennedy. Cox was reluctant, believing that Warren should refuse the request, because it would have adverse impact on the Court. He agreed but asked that Katzenbach not have him try to persuade the chief justice. In the end Warren declined the request, and the two Justice employees left. Within an hour President Johnson called Warren, who capitulated. Warren said in 1969 that because of it, it became "the unhappiest year of my life."

The civil rights legislation that Kennedy was unable to see pass during his lifetime received the needed momentum from his death and the legislative skill of President Johnson. In 1964 the public accommodations bill passed as the Civil Rights Act of 1964. The obvious constitutional attack on the legislation was its constitutionality under the Fourteenth Amendment because it sought to regulate conduct that was not "state action." Cox and Assistant Attorney General and Head of the Civil Rights Division Burke Marshall, however founded the legislation on Congress's power to regulate interstate commerce. Although both John and Robert Kennedy questioned the optics of using the Commerce Clause, they did not object.Cox had no difficulty having the Court uphold the statute on that basis when he argued the cases in October. (Note: See Heart of Atlanta Motel v. United States, 379 U.S. 241 (1964) and Katzenbach v. McClung, 379 U.S. 294 (1964). There was no dissent in either case.)

After a landslide election victory, Johnson used his State of the Union address in January 1965 to, among other things, promise a voting rights act. It was Cox who developed the first draft. The mechanism devised by Cox was to provide for a presumption of illegality of a list of practices including literacy tests and similar devices if the state had a history of low minority voter turn-out as shown by voter statistics. In such cases the burden was shifted to the state to prove nondiscriminatory intent. This mechanism remained the heart of the legislation throughout the legislative process. Both Ramsey Clark and Nicholas Katzenbach admired the mechanism for its legal craftsmanship and statecraft (because it avoided the need to prove intent to discriminate). Before the bill was submitted to Congress Cox answered a question in Court that was used by nationally syndicated columnist Drew Pearson to embarrass Cox before the new president. On January 28, Cox urged the Supreme Court to reverse a lower court decision that held that the federal government had no power to sue a state alleging violation of the Fifteenth Amendment by discriminatory devices aimed at African-Americans. Cox argued the narrow ground that the government had such power. When the Court expressly asked Cox whether he was asking the Court to strike down the statutes, Cox answered that he was not, only that the case be remanded to the three-court panel. The Court's opinion, delivered on March 8, highlighted this exchange in such a way that some inferred that Cox passed up a golden opportunity. (Note: "While the Government has argued that several provisions of the Mississippi laws challenged here might or should be held unconstitutional on their face without introduction of evidence or further hearings, with respect to all the others, the Solicitor General in this Court specifically has declined to 'urge that the constitutionality of these provisions be decided prior to trial.' In this situation, we have decided that it is the more appropriate course to pass only upon the sufficiency of the complaint's allegations to justify relief if proved." United States v. Mississippi, 380 U.S. 128, 143 (1965) (Black, J.).) Pearson's column stated that Cox had cost the civil rights movement two years in litigation, and for that he point blank suggested that Johnson replace Cox as solicitor general.

The Voting Rights Act of 1965 mooted that case, and Cox would go on to defend the legislation successfully before the Court, but he did so as a private attorney. (Note: Cox represented the Commonwealth of Massachusetts, which supported the Act.) In the summer after Johnson's victory Cox offered his resignation in order that Johnson might pick his own Solicitor General if he chose. Although Cox dearly loved the job, (Note: Cox was quoted as saying: "My whole life and career has trained me to look upon the Solicitor's office as second only to God." Years later, after arguing the Bakke case in 1977, Cox told a reporter from the Boston Globe: "There's nothing quite like being back before the Supreme Court.") he overrode Katzenbach's strong objections to his decision. Johnson accepted the resignation on June 25, 1965.

Chief Justice Warren was "non-plussed and made unhappy by the news" that Cox was not reappointed. Senator Kennedy delivered a tribute from the well of the Senate. Even years later his colleagues in the Justice Department praised his service. John W. Douglas, for example, said "he was the best solicitor general that the department's ever had … ." John Seigenthaler likewise found him "great." Students of the office have agreed. Lincoln Caplan called him one of the three most respected Solicitors General in history (together with Robert H. Jackson and John W. Davis). Bruce Terris, who was Assistant Solicitor General in three administrations, said that he "was the best oral advocate I ever saw. … He had the ability to do something I had never seen anybody ever having the ability to do, and I suspect very few people ever had, and that was he had the ability to lecture the Supreme Court. " Even critic Victor Navasky wrote that Cox was "by general agreement one of the most distinguished Solicitors General in the history of the office … ." As Solicitor General Cox personally argued 67 cases before the Court, prevailing in 81%. A study of the eight Solicitors General between 1953 and 1982 found that Cox was the most liberal, filing liberal briefs in 77% of the cases. Supreme Court litigation was his metier, so much so that he would continue to do it in the future even (or especially) when he received no fee.

In 1965, Cox returned to Harvard Law School as a visiting professor, teaching a course in current constitutional law and a section in criminal law.

In 1969, the Legal Services Program (LSP) would bring Shapiro v. Thompson to the Supreme Court after successful arguments in the District court of Connecticut. The first set of oral arguments before the Supreme Court happened on May 1, 1968. Cox would become the primary counsel for Thompson during the rehearing on the 23-24 October 23-24, 1968. Edward Sparer, considered the 'father of welfare law' personally brought in Cox as the lead attorney for the rehearing in 1968. Jacqueline Jones, a social historian, articulates that Archibald Cox's involvement with this case was coordinated. Sparer brought in Cox's legal assistance as he was the solicitor general, well-respected, and a recognized face by the Warren Court. Shapiro v. Thompson was affirmed and Cox's oral argument that welfare was a fundamental right was key to Justice Brennan's majority opinion. This case would also contribute to Justice Warren's "unhappiest year" in 1969, as this case caused direct conflict between Justices Brennan and Warren.

== Watergate special prosecutor ==
=== Terms of engagement ===
Cox was at Berkeley on May 16, 1973, when Secretary of Defense Elliot Richardson, President Nixon's nominee for attorney general, called him to ask if he would consider taking the position of Special Prosecutor in the Watergate affair. Cox had woken up that morning, the day before his 61st birthday, without hearing in his right ear (a condition his doctor would tell him a few days later was permanent), which dampened his enthusiasm for the job—the sensing of which, perhaps, increased Richardson's willingness to make concessions to obtain Cox's consent. Richardson, for his part, was getting "desperate" according to his aide John T. Smith. It was clear that the Senate would make the appointment of a Special Prosecutor a condition of Richardson's confirmation. (Note: Nixon's previous attorney general, Richard Kleindienst, had resigned at the request of the president (together with chief of staff H. R. Haldeman and Nixon counsel John Ehrlichman) on the same day that White House counsel John Dean was fired as part of Nixon's attempt to get out front of the scandal publicly. In hindsight it was probably a mistake to create a vacancy at Justice. No one was then calling for Kleindienst's resignation, but once he resigned the perception was fixed that two attorneys general in a row (the first being John Mitchell) had been tainted with Watergate allegations. Even Senate Republicans now called for the appointment of a Special Prosecutor by a resolution that received unanimous Senate consent. Now that a new attorney general had to be confirmed, Senate Democrats had the leverage to make the appointment of a Special Prosecutor inevitable.) Richardson's staff had prepared a list of 100 candidates. Richardson did not recall how many he had contacted before Cox. Richardson satisfied Cox's concern over independence over two days of phone conversations, and Richardson reduced it to writing.

The resulting "compact" was extraordinary even under the circumstances. The scope was "all offenses arising out of the 1972 election … involving the president, the White House staff or presidential appointments." It was thus not limited to Watergate. The assumption of responsibility for a case was left to the discretion of the Special Prosecutor, who also had sole discretion to decide "whether and to what extent he will inform or consult with the attorney general" on any matter being investigated. The White House thus lost its access to the investigation. In addition, the Special Prosecutor was granted the right to discuss his findings and progress with the press at his discretion. Finally, Cox could be dismissed only by Richardson and only for "extraordinary improprieties"—a standard virtually impossible to meet. The importance of the selection to Richardson's confirmation was highlighted by the fact that he brought Cox along to his hearing before the Senate Judiciary Committee. Democratic Whip Senator Robert Byrd asked Cox if he needed broader authority. Cox replied that he already had "the whip hand." Cox said that the only restraint the president or the Justice Department had over him was to fire him. He also vowed that he would follow the evidence even if it led "to the oval office." Richardson was confirmed.

=== Reaction ===
The president publicly welcomed the selection and, consistent with his new public relations offensive, commended Richardson's "determination" to get to the bottom of the affair. Privately, Nixon seethed with anger. In his memoir he said: "If Richardson searched specifically for the man whom I least trusted, he could hardly have done better." Richardson, however, thought he had the best man for the job, because once Cox cleared the president there would be no hint that he colluded with Nixon or even that he was sympathetic. Richardson had perhaps been misled about what his assignment was (and what the president's true intentions were) when the president instructed him the night Kleindienst was dismissed to "get to the bottom of it" "no matter who[m] it hurts." Richardson was to "stand firm" only on two issues: presidential conversations were to remain privileged and national security matters were not to be investigated. Otherwise "I don't give a Goddam what it is—Mitchell, Stans—anybody." If there were any doubt, the president insisted to Richardson: "You've got to believe I didn't know anything."

Official Washington, however, was skeptical; Cox, they thought, would be ineffective; he was "too soft—not nasty enough." James Doyle, a Washington Star reporter who would later become the chief press advisor for Cox's group, described his own first reaction to meeting Cox: "Prosecutors are supposed to have the instincts of a shark; this one seemed more like a dolphin." That Cox was insufficiently attuned to the politics of his situation was on show when he invited to his swearing-in Senator Ted Kennedy (the one Democrat whom Nixon loathed and feared) as well as Robert Kennedy's widow; had it take place in his old solicitor general's office; and had his old boss, President Roosevelt's Solicitor General Charles Fahy, administer the oath. It convinced Nixon that Cox saw his job as to bring down the president. Nixon now regarded him as a "partisan viper." Not long afterwards, Cox offended Senate Democrats as well by revealing at a press conference a letter requesting Senator Sam Ervin to cancel or at least postpone the Senate Watergate hearings so that he could familiarize himself with the proceedings. (Note: See Doyle 1977, p. 67. Cox wanted to establish his independence, but mostly the request was to protect the integrity of the prosecutions. National publicity might make it impossible for defendants to receive a fair trial, requiring indictments to be dismissed. Defendants and witnesses could watch the testimony and fashion their own accordingly. More significantly, the Senate could grant immunity to witness, to require them to testify, and thus possibly fatally compromise a prosecution. Cox was serious enough about the point that he made a motion to Judge Sirica, who was presiding over the Watergate prosecutions, requesting that he postpone the hearings. Alternately he asked that the court prohibit television coverage of the hearings. Cox also asked the court to prohibit the Senate Committee from granting use immunity to John Dean and Jeb Stuart Magruder. Cox's lawyers researched the points but determined that the judge would deny the motion (which he eventually swiftly did). When Cox realized he would lose, he sent his assistant Philip Heymann to argue the motion. The court denied the motion is all respects.) Ervin told the press: "Professor Cox's request is extraordinarily arrogant." (Note: Quoted in Doyle 1977, p. 68. Committee Counsel Sam Dash used the same word describing their encounter when he visited Cox and Vorenberg on their first day in their offices. Cox told Dash that "you've got to close down your investigation" because it would interfere with the investigation. Dash said he told Cox: "For God's sakes, Archie, we have separation of powers. Our function is quite different than yours. We're supposed to inform the public and ultimately to reform legislation. You're a prosecutor. You're going to be trying to send people to jail. ... This is such an emergency that the public should know now what happened that we can't wait that long and I'm going to recommend to Ervin to say 'no' to you.")

=== Staffing up ===
After he was sworn in on May 25, 1973, Cox returned to Cambridge where he recruited two professors, James Vorenberg and Philip Heymann, to join his staff. The three arrived in Washington on May 29. Cox was faced with reports that the team of federal prosecutors under Earl J. Silbert was about to resign unless given a vote of confidence. Cox appealed to their sense of professionalism without comment on how the case was handled. (Note: Silbert believed he was unfairly accused of failing to follow-up leads and confining the investigation for political reasons. He believed that his strategy of prosecuting the burglars, seeking maximum sentences and then after conviction requiring them to testify under immunity ultimately produced first the disclosures of McCord, then the cooperation of Magruder and Dean. But as Heymann pointed out, the purpose of the appointment of a Special Prosecutor was precisely to "substitute his credibility" for that of Silbert's.) A bigger problem was Silbert's boss, Henry E. Petersen, a career FBI/Justice Department employee appointed Assistant Attorney General by Nixon, who had regular meetings with Nixon, but would only provide vague descriptions to Cox, and point blank refused to turn over his memorandum of one such meeting, claiming executive privilege on behalf of Nixon. (Note: The meeting between Petersen and the president that was the focus of the first conversation took place on April 15, 1973. Cox and Vorenberg were concerned about leaks and whether confidential grand jury information was being misused. Petersen insisted that the president agreed that he should not receive any grand jury material. During the course of the interview Petersen mentioned that Nixon had a tape of a conversation he had with Dean (during which Dean claimed the Justice Department was about to give him immunity). Cox did not follow-up on that clue. Later proceedings would show that Petersen had kept Dean informed of grand jury testimony, brief the president on Dean's testimony, and gave Nixon a written summary of the evidence against Haldemann and Ehrlichman. Nixon discussed these materials with both his aides. As for the April 15 meeting, when the tapes were finally produced, the tape for that meeting was missing.)

Cox concluded that a top priority was to hire a pre-eminent criminal trial attorney to supervise the prosecutors until the office was up and running and then try the cases after indictment. He persuaded James F. Neal, the U.S. attorney who obtained the conviction of Jimmy Hoffa in 1964 for jury tampering, now in private practice, to come aboard for several weeks to stabilize the ship. Neal would stay to the end, at the end of each promised period promising only a few more weeks; he became Cox's number two man, picked to be the chief trial attorney. Vorenberg became number three and spent much of the early period recruiting lawyers. Vorenberg divided the mission into five task forces: the first to sign on was Thomas F. McBride who would head up the task force on campaign contributions and would obtain the conviction of George Steinbrenner; William Merril would head up the Plumbers task force; Richard J. Davis would handle the task force investigating "dirty tricks;" Joseph J. Connolly headed up the force investigating the ITT antitrust settlement; and James Neal headed the largest group, the Watergate task force, which dealt with the cover up and included George Frampton, Richard Ben-Veniste, and Jill Wine Volner. Henry S. Ruth became Cox's deputy and Phil Lacovara became Cox's counsel. With a view toward establishing better relations with the press, Cox designated James Doyle his spokesman.

=== Joining issue ===
The Special Prosecutor's office had to catch up with the federal prosecutors. The Senate Watergate committee was in competition for Dean's testimony, and leaks suggested they were about to get it. On June 3, published reports said that Dean would testify that he had spoken to the president about Watergate 35 times. On the next day the Deputy White House spokesman admitted that the two spoke frequently, but insisted that the discussions were in furtherance of the president's new determination to get to the bottom of the scandal. The spokesman admitted there were logs of all such conversations, but that they would not be turned over on the ground that they were covered by "executive privilege." Before Cox could litigate the issue of executive privilege and his entitlement to the documents, he had to fashion a reasonably specific subpoena that might be enforced in court. But he had no idea how the White House files were organized, so he scheduled a meeting with the president's counsel on June 6 to discuss his documents request.

The president's new defense team was made up of one-time Democrat Leonard Garment, University of Texas constitutional law professor Charles Alan Wright, and Nixon true believer J. Fred Buzhardt. Cox made three requests: the Petersen document concerning his meeting with Nixon; Petersen's memorandum to Haldeman summarizing the same meeting; and the tape of the conversation between Nixon and Dean mentioned by Petersen from the same meeting. Vorenberg added a request for all logs between the president and key aides from June 1972 to May 1973. Buzhardt said that only the president could determine what he would produce. Garment and Wright argued about executive privilege, which Wright said applied not only to presidential documents but ones of his aides such as Haldeman and Ehrlichman. As for the tape of the April 15 Dean meeting, Buzhardt (falsely) suggested it was not a tape of the meeting but rather the president's later dictated tape about the meeting. No resolution was arrived at, but the president's lawyers did not reject the requests outright.

The president's legal team employed an approach that would become familiar: state an overly broad position, equivocate, delay, and then abruptly make partial concessions in the face of perceived popular disapproval. Shortly after their meeting, Cox announced a sudden press conference (unrelated to the discovery dispute). Buzhardt, thinking that Cox planned to go public with the dispute over the documents, called Vorenberg. Instead of discussing the press conference Vorenberg reminded Buzhardt of the documents requests. Buzhardt assured Vorenberg that a package would soon be delivered. Twenty minutes before the press conference, the package arrived containing the logs of presidential meetings and telephone conferences with key aides, including Dean, Haldeman, and Ehrlichman. The press conference took place and involved (as was originally planned) only an introduction to several new attorneys. The documents, however, together with the logs of Haldeman and Ehrlichman themselves proved essential to draft subpoenas sufficiently specific to elicit documents, and more crucially when their existence would later become known, the tapes.

By mid-June the office was fully functioning. Silbert's U.S. attorney's team was finally eased out on June 29, much to the chagrin of the federal prosecutors. (Note: The prosecutors were broadsided on June 21 by an amicus brief of the ACLU in support of McCord's motion to vacate his conviction. The ACLU brief urged the court to vacate all the convictions based on multiple frauds perpetrated on the court by prosecutors who had engaged in a "sham prosecution." Silbert's diaries showed that he was frustrated by the allegations of people who believed he was not zealous enough and resented the appointment of Cox. He requested a vindication of his teams' proceedings. Cox replied that he saw nothing that showed they acted other than pursuant to the "honest judgment" and in "complete good faith.") The task force that was to show the first results was McBridge's campaign finance group. On July 6, American Airlines admitted that it made an illegal $55,000 campaign contribution to Nixon's personal lawyer Herb Kalmbach. Within two months the Special Prosecutor would uncover illegal contributions by Ashland Oil, Gulf Oil, Goodyear Tire and Rubber, Minnesota Mining and Manufacturing, Phillips Petroleum, and Braniff Airlines. While the center of media attention was on the cover up, by January, according to a Harris survey, 81% of Americans believed "illegal corporate money-givers" were "harmful to the country."

=== White House tapes ===
Herb Kalmbach, especially of interest to the illegal campaign contributions task force, (Note: Kalmbach was Nixon's personal lawyer who specialized in raising large sums for Nixon's campaigns from large corporations. Even before the Watergate break-in Kalmbach was known as one from whom White House influence could be purchased for cash. Not only was he the chief fundraiser in the 1972 campaign he was one of very few who could draw on money from a "secret political espionage fund.") was scheduled to testify before the Senate Watergate Committee on July 16. Instead, Haldeman's aide Col. Alexander Butterfield was inserted as a "mystery witness." During his 30-minute testimony he revealed the secret taping system that was installed in the Oval Office, the president's office at the Executive Office Building, and at Camp David)—a voice-activated mechanism designed to capture everything spoken by or to the president. The existence of the tapes was the biggest piece of evidence unearthed by the Senate Watergate Committee; around it much of the remainder of the cover-up case would revolve. (Note: Aside from Butterfield's testimony, all the testimony televised by the Watergate Committee had been developed by the federal prosecutors in the District of Columbia U.S. attorney's office. Moreover, the presentation by the committee was largely inept in the opinion of the Special Counsel's staff. Dean, for example, escaped serious cross-examination. The committee allowed burglar Bernard Barker to testify without serious challenge to the patriotic motives of his cohorts, explaining that he believed that the Watergate Hotel contained evidence that Fidel Castro was sending money to Senator Edward Kennedy. And no one asked him how money from the Nixon campaign committee ended up in his bank account. Nevertheless, without the disclosure of the tapes, the eventual outcome would have been in substantial doubt.)

The materiality of certain tapes was self-evident. Tapes of conversations testified to by John Dean would either show that Dean's account was accurate, in which case the president was complicit in obstruction of justice, or false, in which case Dean committed perjury in his testimony to the Senate. The relevance of other tapes could be inferred from the proximity of meetings to Watergate-related events. Cox believed he could maximize his chance for a favorable ruling by limiting the scope of his initial request to material arguably important to the criminal proceedings. Once he obtained a ruling that executive privilege gave way to a compelling need in a criminal prosecution, he could ask for additional material later. So on July 18 Cox sent Buzhardt a written request for eight specific tapes. (Note: One tape requested covered the meeting of Nixon, Haldeman, and Ehrlichman on June 20, 1972, their first meeting after the break-in. The remaining seven tapes covered meetings between Dean and Nixon in September 1972 and the spring of 1973. Since Dean had testified about these meetings with the permission of the president, Nixon arguably waived any privilege that may have attached to them.) On July 23, Wright responded in writing denying the request on grounds of executive privilege and separation of powers. That evening Cox had a grand jury subpoena demanding the eight tapes and three other items (Note: The three additional items consisted of: a tape of a meeting on March 21; a memo of March 30 between two White House personnel employees concerning Hunt's employment; and memoranda between Gordon Strachan and Haldeman from November 1971 to November 1972 concerning sale of ambassadorships. The second item had been voluntarily delivered to the FBI. Its inclusion was designed to bolster the waiver argument. The third group was designed to show that the White House interested itself in political matters and therefore privilege covering his "executive" function should not apply.) served on Buzhardt who accepted on behalf of the president.

On July 26, Chief Judge John J. Sirica (Note: By virtue of being chief judge of the United States Court for the District of the District of Columbia Sirica handled all grand jury matters. He also was the trial judge of the original Watergate break-in case.) received a letter from Nixon himself responding to the subpoena in which he asserted that it would be as inappropriate for the court to compel him as it would for him to compel the court. He was therefore not producing the tapes. But he included a copy of the March 30 memo concerning Hunt's employment and promised to make available the Strachan political documents concerning ambassadorships. Within an hour Cox was before the grand jury, explaining the response to them; they voted to request Sirica to issue an order to Nixon to show cause why there should not be prompt compliance with the subpoena. Sirica had the members individually polled and issued the order.

Sirica allowed the parties a month to brief the issue, which came for a hearing on August 22. Wright took a broad, absolutist position claiming the president was the only person who could decide what materials to turn over to them. He relayed Nixon's feelings on national security, saying that Nixon told him that one tape had "national security information so highly sensitive that he did not feel free to hint to me what the nature of it is" despite Wright's full national security clearance. Wright said that the president's power was so inclusive that he could terminate the Special Prosecutor's office and have all the cases dismissed. Cox, on his turn, emphasized the peculiar situation here where there "is strong reason to believe the integrity of the executive office has been corrupted" and pointed out that the president had permitted his staff to testify about the meetings covered by the tapes but refused to turn over the tapes themselves, (Note: A stark example was seen when Haldeman had been given access to the tapes to prepare his testimony and then having "refreshed his recollection" about the meetings testified before the Senate Watergate Committee. ordinarily when a witness uses material to refresh his recollection, the cross-examiner is entitled to see it and have it received into evidence if he so moves. This tradition is reflected as for "writings" in Federal Rule of Evidence 612(b).) which would be the better evidence of what transpired. As for the claim that the president could terminate his commission, Cox said (presciently in hindsight) that even if were true, then the president would have to accept the political repercussions that would follow exercising that power. After questioning Wright for about 17 minutes (and Cox only 8), the judge said he hoped to have a decision within a week.

On August 29, the court ordered the president to deliver all the material to him for review. The decision amounted to a rejection of Wright's absolutist argument. Although not a complete victory for Cox, (Note: The Special Prosecutor's office was particularly concerned with the sentence that "If privileged and unprivileged evidence are so inextricably connected that separation becomes impossible, the whole must be privileged and no disclosure made to the grand jury." Cox was concerned that he would have no input into the decision; it would be made by a judge who was unfamiliar with how all the evidence connected. What made the decision to involve himself the more odd was that neither side had suggested or briefed the issue.) Sirica ignored the national security argument, and the decision was widely considered as historic—the first time a court ordered a president to produce evidence since Chief Justice John Marshall in 1807 ordered President Thomas Jefferson to produce documents. The White House quickly announced that Nixon "will not comply with the order." Wright said that they were considering an appeal, but the statement "hinted that they might find some other method of sustaining the president's legal position."

The president did appeal, but to the public irritation of Wright, the Circuit Court of Appeals ordered the proceedings expedited, scheduling argument for the following week before the entire circuit. (Note: The appellate court moved up the schedule in light of the expiration of the grand jury in early December. A decision by the end of September would also give the Supreme Court a chance to hear the case upon its return on October 1. A hearing before the entire circuit rather than the usual three-court panel also deprived the losing party from delay associated with a petition for hearing en banc.) At the argument on September 11 Wright again took the maximum view of executive privilege. In response to a question by Chief Judge David L. Bazelon, Wright said that he could think of no circumstance that the tapes could be demanded by courts. He said, however, that the White House had made information available, waiving the privilege, but tapes constituted "the raw material of life," something essentially privileged. Wright maintained that the privilege survived even if abused, such as by the president engaging in fraud or other crime. Cox's approach, just as in the sit-in and reapportionment cases, was to avoid asserting a broad legal principle and instead show how the case was sui generis, unlikely to establish a precedent soon relied on, and one that fit easily within existing principles of administration of justice. Observers believed Cox had won. Instead, the Court's decision two days later (even before the time the court had provided for post-argument briefs) gave the parties one week to come up with a compromise.

=== Negotiations, grand jury progress, and the court's decision ===
The Circuit Court's recommendation was that the parties come to an arrangement whereby the president would submit portions of the tapes to Cox and Wright who would decide with Nixon what portions would be submitted to the grand jury. Cox announced almost immediately that he was willing to discuss the matter with the White House lawyers. The White House would only say that it was studying the matter; Wright had already returned to Texas. The Court instructed the parties to report back within one week. If no arrangement could be made, it would decide the appeal.

Nixon had lost patience with Cox and was in no mood to negotiate (even though the court's suggestion strongly implied that it would order production of the tapes if there was no settlement). While the lawyers engaged in delay, Nixon was trying to control Cox through Richardson. For three months, Alexander Haig, H.R. Haldeman's replacement as White House chief of staff, had been directing Richardson to clamp down on Cox with increasingly more explicit threats until it reached the boiling point just at this moment. (Note: In mid-June Haig complained to Richardson after Cox told reporters he might subpoena the president. Several weeks later he called Richardson to tell him that the president was "very uptight" about Cox and wanted "a line drawn." The president would "get rid" of him if he strayed outside the lines. On July 7 Nixon wrote Haig that he wanted "Richardson to rein in Archibald Cox and take him to task for 'conducting a partisan political vendetta rather than [doing] … the job he was appointed to do—bring the Watergate defendants to trial at the earliest possible date." The incident that infuriated Nixon and set him on a course of inflexible hostility towards Cox took place when Cox requested news clippings concerning the controversy over the source of funds used to renovate Nixon's estate at San Clemente. Haig three times interrupted a meeting Richardson was having with Maryland prosecutors informing Richardson for the first time of the case they were going to bring against Vice President Spiro Agnew. On the third call Nixon took the phone and demanded that Richardson get Cox to make a retraction within 30 minutes or he would to fire Cox. The demands, threats and complaints to Richardson continued, until on September 25, just around the time the parties were supposed to be negotiating over the tapes, Nixon concluded a meeting with Richardson by saying that after the Agnew affair was over he wanted to get rid of Cox.) Buzhardt nevertheless made an offer: he would summarize the tapes with each participant's conversations re-written in the third person. It was an unworkable scheme, but Cox decided to continue negotiations over the next several days. Cox then drafted a 6-page counter-proposal providing for transcriptions of the actual conversations together with a third-party certification that the rest of the tape was irrelevant. At the last meeting, when Nixon's lawyers showed willingness to have a third party certify transcripts, Cox gave them his proposal and then left to give them a chance to consider it. In less than an hour Buzhardt called, rejecting the proposal and ending the negotiations. The parties informed the court that they could not reach agreement.

Aside from the tapes, the Special Prosecutor's office was making substantial progress on all fronts. The Watergate task force was initially stymied in their case against John Dean. Dean's lawyer made a compelling argument that the government could not proceed against him on the basis of the information he proffered during his plea negotiations with Silbert's prosecutors. A court would require a showing that the evidence used by the government had an independent basis than that proffered by Dean. It took careful combing of the file to find a letter from one of the prosecutors to Dean's lawyer noting that Dean had failed to inform them about two specific crimes that two other witnesses disclosed. Dean's lawyer replied that the omission was an oversight. The two letters showed that there existed an independent basis to prosecute Dean. Jim Neal gave Dean until the third week of October to agree to plead to one felony count, with the obligation to become a prosecution witness, or else face indictment on the two separate incidents. The plea before Judge Sirica (known among the criminal bar as "Maximum John") would certainly require prison time, but Dean would likely receive favorable consideration for a reduced sentence if he cooperated.

The other task forces were also proceeding apace. Connolly's task force was readying perjury indictments: one involved former Attorney General Kleindienst who now admitted that in fact Nixon had ordered him to dismiss the ITT antitrust suit in consideration of ITT's campaign contributions. The dirty tricks task force of Richard Davis obtained a plea of guilty by Donald Segretti to three counts of illegal campaign activity. It was now preparing a perjury indictment against Dwight Chapin. New information suggested an illegal contribution of $100,000 cash (in $100 bills) from Howard Hughes through Charles "Bebe" Rebozo to Nixon's campaign. Inasmuch as Cox had to recuse himself from this case, (Note: Cox believed that there was an appearance of conflict of interest since his younger brother Maxwell was a member of the New York law firm that represented Howard Hughes. Nationally syndicated columnist Jack Anderson later reported that the feeling at the Special Prosecutor's office was that the Rebozo case more than the desire to shield the tapes was the motivating factor in Nixon's decision to fire Cox.) he assigned it to McBride and authorized Ruth to make all decisions but asked for a prompt and diligent investigation. The Plumbers task force was considering how to trace the chain of authority in the Fielding break-in case, given their lack of a high-level cooperating witness, but they had ready perjury indictments against John Mitchell and Egil Krogh; Krogh would be indicted October 11. While most of this activity went unreported, people tapped into the network of defense attorneys and grand jury witnesses (including the White House) knew that the noose was being tightened around the president. One reporter told James Doyle that a "middle-level White House guy told him on September 28: "Over here they talk about how to get Cox all the time."

It was the Krogh indictment that forced Richardson to have another meeting with Cox on October 12. The break-in of Daniel Ellsberg's psychiatrist's office was still claimed by the White House to involve national security matters, and Richardson and Cox had an agreement that Cox would notify the attorney general before any indictment in that matter was filed. Richardson wanted to know why he was not notified. Cox, surprised, explained that the agreement did not involve perjury indictments (which could not betray national security secrets, since they would involve public testimony). Richardson, checking his notes of their understanding, agreed with Cox and then apologized for forgetting that provision. He then had a bizarre conversation with Cox during which he said that soon he would have to "push Cox," but that sometimes "it's better to lose your hat than your head." Perplexed, Cox returned to his office and was in the midst of telling Doyle of the conversation, when two lawyers interrupted to say the Circuit Court of Appeals had filed their decision just after 6 p.m.

The 5–2 decision of the Court of Appeals was an utter defeat for the president, (Note: The court rejected entirely the two broad principles urged by Wright: that separation of powers deprived the court jurisdiction to hear the case and that the president was the only person entitled to decide what items were covered by executive privilege: "Whenever a privilege is asserted, even one expressed in the constitution, such as the speech and debate privilege, it is the courts that determine the validity of the assertion and the scope of the privilege." If an executive privilege exists (and it is not found in the text of the constitution), the court held the privilege is not absolute and the courts, not the president, must be the arbiter. The court then examined the specific circumstances of the case, it found that only a portion of one tape involved military secrets. As for the rest, only a generalized interest in protecting the confidentiality of presidential communications was asserted, and the court found that the particular need of the grand jury in this case overweighed that generalized interest.) and the papers highlighted the statement that the president was not "above the law's commands." The court modified Judge Sirica's order and required Nixon's lawyers to specify the grounds of any privilege they were claiming as to particular portions of the tape, and Cox was to be furnished with the specifications. Cox was also to be given access to the material in any instance when the Court was in doubt of the relevance to the criminal proceedings. In this case, the court said, "any concern over confidentiality is minimized by the attorney general's designation of a distinguished and reflective counsel as Special Prosecutor." In short, the court required disclosure except for portions that the president could articulate a particularized need for confidentiality, and Cox was permitted to see any portion where Sirica needed guidance on relevance.

=== White House ultimatum ===
Unlike its actions following the Sirica decision, the White House remained quiet that Friday night and through the weekend following the Court of Appeals ruling. Cox had no response until he met Richardson at 6:00 p.m. on Monday, October 15. Cox thought this meeting would be a continuation of the "Byzantine" conversation (as Cox called it) from the previous Friday, but instead Richardson appeared now to be the point man on negotiations over the tapes. (Note: On Saturday October 13, Wright telephoned from Texas that the president should appeal to the Supreme Court. Nixon, however, did not want to take the risk of losing in the Court whose ruling he publicly pledged to respect. As Richardson came to realize later, the plan of Nixon and Haig was to force Cox to resign or at least engineer a situation that made it appear that Cox was in the wrong so as to justify firing him. It was essential for this plan, however, that Richardson appear to be the one negotiating with Cox and, even more importantly, not resign but instead fire Cox when Cox refused Richardson's "reasonable proposal." On Monday morning Haig had Richardson in the White House and either appealing to his vanity or in an attempt to keep him off balance gave an elaborate presentation on the progress of the war by Egypt and Syria against Israel, which had resulted in a tense standoff between the Soviet Union and the United States the previous week. He then turned to Watergate and told Richardson that Nixon had decided to fire Cox and submit to Sirica summaries of the tapes verified by him. He even had a draft letter directing Richardson to fire Cox. Richardson told him he would resign if he received such a letter. Buzhardt met Richardson separately and suggested that a third party verifier might be an alternative. Richardson seized on the idea and urged Haig to press in upon the president as a way to avoid adverse public reaction. When back at his office, he received a phone call from Haig saying he would try to persuade the president to use a third party and would suggest Senator John Stennis. An hour later he called again to say that the president would agree on two conditions: Cox would be barred from asking for any more documents, tapes, or other presidential material; and Richardson must agree to fire Cox if the latter balked. Richardson said that he would call back within an hour. When he did, he told Haig that he would not fire Cox under these circumstances. Haig responded by merely saying that he would contact Stennis directly to seek his cooperation. At 4:00 p.m. he again met with Haig and Buzhardt who told him Stennis was on board. They gave him the impression that the Stennis plan was very similar to the plan Cox had proposed but Buzhardt said that plan was confidential and did not give a copy to Richardson.) Richardson gave an outline of a proposal to have Senator John Stennis authenticate transcripts of relevant portions of the tapes. Cox was able to infer that Richardson had gotten orders from the White House and was concerned that if a compromise was not reached one or both would be fired. During the 75-minute meeting, Cox asked a long list of questions, including where he would stand with respect to future demands for documents, tapes, or other material. Because he had an engagement, Richardson proposed they meet again in the morning. The next day Richardson told Cox that if they did not have an agreement by Friday "the consequences will be very serious for both of us." Cox objected to the deadline, suggesting that if their talks continue they could easily get a postponement of any response due the court. Richardson could not explain why there was a deadline and instead wanted to go over the points they had agreed upon, then discuss other issues; but Cox insisted that it was an inefficient way to proceed and gave him his earlier 6-page proposal; and Richardson agreed to write a counter-proposal.

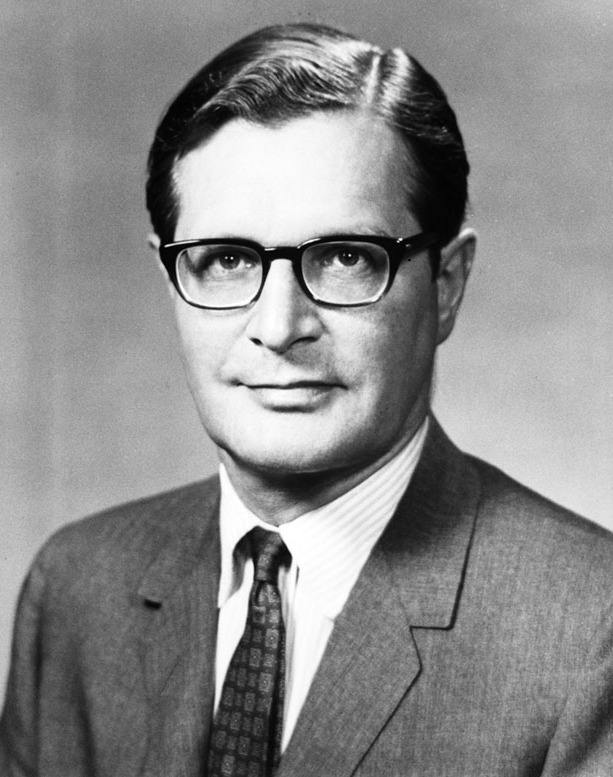
Elliot Richardson, photo portrait during the Nixon administration

Cox did not hear from Richardson the rest of Tuesday or Wednesday. There was much disagreement in the Special Prosecutor's office whether Cox should accept the proposal at all. Much of the concern had to do with Senator Stennis, a Nixon supporter, but more importantly a frail, partially deaf 72-year-old who only recently had recovered from a near fatal gunshot wound in a mugging in January. Cox was worried that rejecting a deal would risk obtaining anything from the White House. James Neal cautioned that if he rejected a compromise a large part of the country might accuse him of acting like a "super-president" without any checks. Doyle had the opposite concern: if Cox accepted less than the tapes, which the court ordered turned over, he might be seen as part of the cover-up. (Note: There was some evidence supporting Doyle's view. The much tighter agreement that Cox proposed before the Court of Appeals decision produced this response by Senate Majority Leader, one of the few outside the office who saw it: "Well, you've offered to give ninety percent of it away." Richardson now wanted him to give away more.) James Neal had a suggestion to minimize the Stennis problem—have him appointed by the court as one of several special masters. In that way he could obtain assistance in a publicly regulated manner. In the midst of the internal debate word came in the afternoon of Wednesday, October 17, that Judge Sirica dismissed the suit of the Senate Watergate Committee against Nixon seeking the tapes. Sirica ruled that the court lacked subject matter jurisdiction. It left the Special Prosecutor as the only means by which the tapes could be made public. Pressure on Cox to seek the material increased, while the White House was left with only one avenue to block it and so had added incentive to pressure Richardson to get Cox either to compromise or resign.

At 5:00 p.m. Richardson hand-delivered to Cox a draft entitled "A Proposal", which contained the Buzhardt comments. He called Cox at 6:00 for his comments. Cox replied: "I think I should respond in writing, Elliot." That night James Neal and Dean's lawyer worked past midnight finalizing John Dean's plea agreement. At about 2:30 a.m. Neal had the lawyer review with Dean the agreement, including the provision that if any testimony he had already given proved materially false, he could be prosecuted for perjury. Neal said that when Dean agreed to the plea deal containing that proviso, he knew that Dean's version of the events was truthful and he also realized that "Archibald Cox was in serious trouble with the president."

On Thursday, October 18, Cox drafted an 11-point reply to Richardson. Cox assured Richardson that he was "not unamenable" to a solution in which he had no direct access to the tapes. But he felt that it was unfair to depend on one individual to be responsible for verification, so he proposed Neal's idea of three "Special Masters" whose identities were disclosed from the start. He commented on the method for determining what portions would be transcribed and suggested that the tapes be subject to analysis for tampering. The comments went by messenger at mid-afternoon. Richardson around 6 p.m. brought it to the White House, where Wright had just returned from Texas (to finalize the appeal papers to the Supreme Court that were due the following day), and although he had just reviewed the "Stennis proposal," he was enthusiastically extolling its reasonableness and holding forth on how the president could convince the American people that it was the solution to the crisis. When shown the Cox counter-proposal, he was outraged that Cox had "rejected" the president's offer. Wright counseled rejection of Cox's counteroffer since he believed the president had a "50–50 chance" in the Supreme Court to win outright. (Note: Neither Wright nor any of Nixon's other lawyers had been permitted to listen to the tapes, so they did not know how clearly they showed the president's culpability for obstruction of justice at least. They were unable therefore to evaluate how serious a risk a 50% chance of full disclose constituted. Moreover, Wright at least was still unaware that the president had already ruled out presenting his case to the Supreme Court.) Richardson, perplexed at the opposition to negotiating with Cox, suggested to Wright: "Charlie, why don't you call Archie and see if you can sell it to him." (Note: Both Richardson and Wright were unaware that the Nixon-Haig plan was to isolate the president's lawyers from the negotiations in order to use Richardson, and his reputation for integrity, to help sell the reasonableness of the plan. Back in his office that night after considering whether he would be able to pressure Cox the way the White House wanted him to, Richardson wrote out a memo entitled "Why I must resign", which concluded that the president's attitude toward Cox was not "fundamentally valid.") That night Wright called Cox and was routed to the phone in Cox's brother's home in Virginia, where Cox was having dinner and playing with his brother's children. Wright gave Cox an ultimatum with four points, the most important of which was that Cox would be given no more tapes beyond the nine that were being transcribed (a condition not in the Stennis proposal). (Note: The other three were: that only Stennis would be involved, that there would be no "Special Masters" and that Cox himself would have no access to the tapes, only the summaries.) Cox asked that Wright send the points to him in writing so that he could consider them the next day and assured him that he was not rejecting the points outright.

At 8:30 a.m. on Friday October 19, the day of Nixon's deadline for appealing to the Supreme Court (otherwise the Court of Appeals decision would become final), Cox received a letter from Wright dated the previous night. It purported to confirm Cox's "rejection" of Richardson's "very reasonable proposal." There was no mention of the four conditions. He wrote that he would telephone at 10:00 a.m. to find out if there was any reason to continue talking. Cox, who until then had publicly and privately spoken of the integrity of Wright, told his colleagues: "very clever lies." Cox wrote a note to Wright saying that the proposal needed "fleshing out," particularly in light of the conditions Wright had set out in the phone call the previous night, which Cox put in writing for the record. He, Neal, and others then left for Sirica's courtroom to attend the plea hearing on John Dean. The White House, seeing only that a hearing had been scheduled, panicked, not knowing what was to take place; no attorney was present when Ruth and Lacovara arrived to deliver the letter and they left it with the guard. Haig quickly learned of the letter, told Richardson that Cox "rejected" the deal, and summoned him to the White House. To Richardson's surprise, Haig said that it was no longer necessary to fire Cox because the president had gotten bipartisan approval for the deal, there were meetings with the two leading members of the Senate Watergate Committee scheduled, and the plan would be acceptable to both the American people and the courts.

The guilty plea by John Dean (with obligation to cooperate) that morning represented the most significant step so far in the prosecutions. (Note: Cox was unaware that Nixon had a bigger preoccupation. The Miami Herald that morning had a front page story that Bebe Rebozo was the subject of an investigation for tax fraud for the $100,000 from Howard Hughes supposedly for Nixon's campaign. Rebozo was on his way to Washington at that very moment. The White House was drawing inferences from all these matters. Later in the day Richardson telephoned to find out if Cox had named Nixon as an unindicted co-conspirator in any indictment. With that call Cox realized that paranoia was running high at the White House.) Yet, when Cox returned to the office it remained quiet—Wright had neither called nor responded in writing. When the courts closed, there was still no sign that the president had filed a notice to appeal to the Supreme Court. At 5:23 p.m. a letter from Wright arrived, which simply again maintained the reasonableness of the original proposal. Wright closed with a statement of regret that Cox would not agree. Cox now realized that he and Richardson had been allowed to negotiate even though the president had no intention to go beyond the inadequate first proposal. On this conclusion, the lawyers in the office began copying their most important memos for safe keeping. At 7:20 Richardson phoned Cox at home and read him a letter he just received from Wright informing him the Stennis plan had been agreed to by the leadership of the Senate Watergate Committee and that Cox would be instructed to not pursue any further presidential material. A statement was to be released that night. Cox and Doyle hurried back to the office. When they obtained the statement they saw it as an attempt to sell the unilateral proposal; it claimed that the plan had the approval of Senators Sam Ervin and Howard Baker, who, the statement falsely said, were the ones who proposed Senator Stennis. Although Cox had refused to agree, Nixon planned to take the proposal to Sirica and instructed his lawyers not to seek Supreme Court review. Given that the statement was riddled with falsehoods, (Note: When Sam Ervin was reached in North Carolina by Sam Dash the next morning, for example, he said that he had been told that the committee would get complete transcripts not summaries and that he never agreed that the procedure should apply to the Special Prosecutor.) Cox that night dictated a press release to Doyle (the staff had gone off for the three-day weekend), and Doyle phoned it in to the wire services, also announcing there would be a press conference on Saturday, at 1:00 p.m.

=== Saturday Night Massacre ===
Doyle was able to use his press contacts to secure the ballroom of the National Press Club for the 1:00 p.m. press conference on Saturday, October 20. It was to be broadcast live on NBC and CBS and a summary would be shown during half-time of the football game being shown on ABC. Cox that morning was quite concerned about whether he would be able to take the president on alone. He was well aware that he had no institutional support, and the apparent defection of Sam Ervin of the Senate Watergate Committee profoundly troubled him. "Spineless!" he remarked on reading of it. He was also concerned about lack of political support. (Note: Although political support would have helped level the balance of power, Cox felt it inappropriate for a prosecutor to set out to build it. Heymann said: "In the ominous days before the Saturday Night Massacre when Cox might well have been marshaling political support, he did not, and found himself quite alone among the responsible figures in insisting on access to the crucial tapes when the Senators most involved had accepted an inadequate substitute. He didn't think a prosecutor should be marshaling Congressional support. Indeed, he regretted deeply the few hesitant steps he had taken in that direction when he earlier had reason to fear interference with the execution of the law.") Just six days before Senator George McGovern had told the ACLU, which had just taken out newspaper ads calling for Nixon's impeachment, that there was not yet support for it; in fact, there was not even enough strength in the opposition to override vetoes. As for Nixon's statement itself, influential members seemed behind it: Republican Senate minority leader Hugh Scott called it a "very wise solution." Democratic Speaker Carl Albert characterized it, noncommitally, as "interesting." Even Senate majority leader Mike Mansfield said it was a way "to avoid a constitutional confrontation." When Joseph Connolly called an aide to liberal Republican Senator Richard Schweiker, he was told that the senator "can't get out front on this." At the office, the lawyer staff assembled to discuss the matter as a group for the first time. Philip Heymann had flown in from Cambridge to lend support. They offered contradictory advice, and Cox asked them to go to their offices to write up suggestions for him. At 11:00 a.m. he met them again and gave something of a valedictory and urged them to continue working if he were fired. At 12:30, Cox, Phyllis, James Doyle, and John Barker walked to the National Press Club. "He was plenty upset," said Barker.

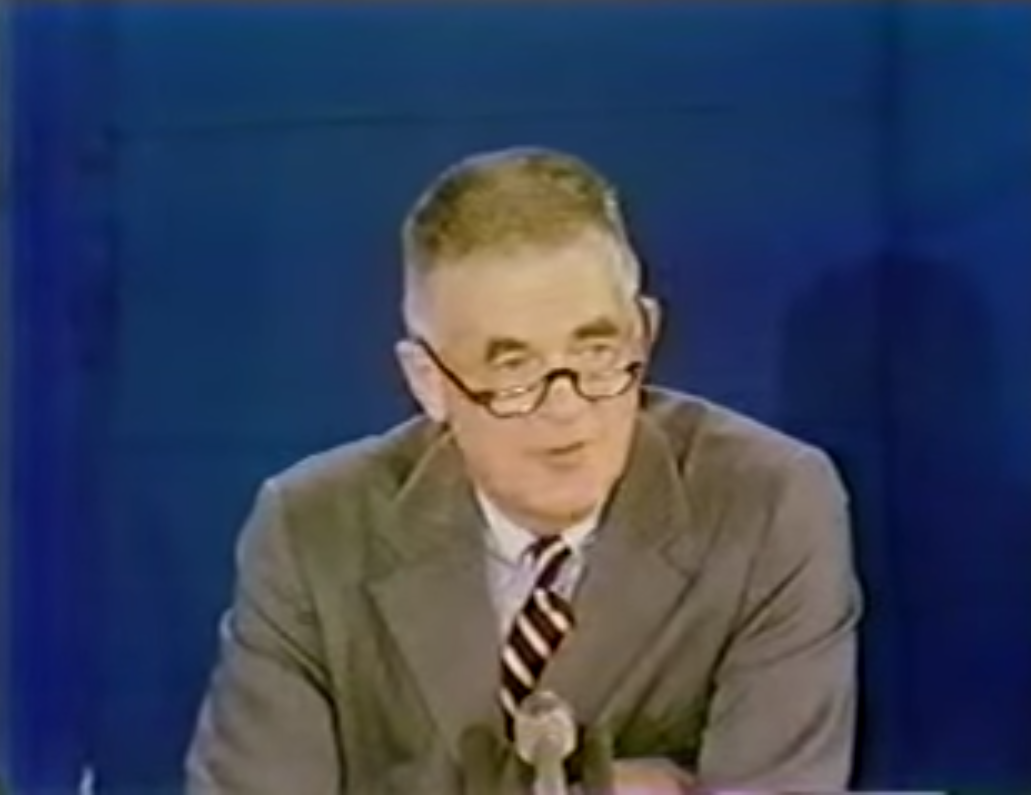
Archibald Cox at the National Press Club on October 20, 1973

Richardson was on the phone when Cox arrived and read to him the text of a letter he had sent to the president that day in which he said that Nixon's instructions gave him "serious difficulties" and outlined several steps that still might save the compromise. Phyllis, holding his hand, walked him to the stage, where they were photographed. Cox then sat down at the table and began his impromptu remarks.

Heymann thought he started out nervous, defensively saying that he was "not out to get the president …" Once he got into the details of the history and significance of the dispute over the tapes, which involved a patient explanation of criminal procedure, evidence, administrative and constitutional law, he relaxed. Doyle said: "He was folksy, unpretentious, disarming. He seemed the country lawyer, talking good sense." While he used simple terms and short sentences, he was not patronizing or supercilious. "He offered a masterful professorial performance, designed to explain the legal and constitutional confrontation in terms that struck at the core of the layman's treasured values essential to the American system." He defended established institutions and regular procedure. By contrast, the president's proposal involved deciding that a "court order would not be obeyed." In the place of evidence, which Cox sought, the president proposed providing "summaries" while the genuine, irrefutable evidence, the tapes of what actually transpired, would be available to only two or three men, "all but one of them the aides to the president and men who have been associated with those who are the subject of the investigation." In describing the course of the negotiations for all information, he showed how the White House lawyers had stalled from the beginning. But he never attacked anyone, at one point taking Buzhardt off the hook: "he has behaved in dealing with me in an entirely honorable way —except that he's too damn slow." With the questions that followed, Cox spent more than an hour, at the end of which his staff handed out copies of the various proposals and correspondence that took place during the week. It was so persuasive a performance that Sarah McClendon, White House correspondent known for her sharp questions, approached Cox and said: "I want to shake your hand, you are a great American." Doyle wrote that it was "the most unusual press conference I have ever attended. The hard-bitten, cynical press corps was rooting for Archibald Cox." John Douglas said: "It was one of the most spectacular performances, one of two or three press conference ever held in this country which have had a significant effect on public opinion."

The press conference also unravelled the Nixon-Haig plan. Cox did not resign, nor was he cowed by the president's directive. Moreover, instead of exploiting Richardson's reputation for integrity to his own advantage (a key feature on which the plan was based), the president was forced to act in his own name, and Cox was able to draw Richardson to his side by defending him as honorable. So the White House decided to fire Cox. It was unable, however, to make either Richardson or his deputy William Ruckelshaus carry out the order. Each resigned in turn rather than fire Cox, although the White House later claimed it fired Ruckelshaus. Solicitor General Robert Bork (third in line at the Justice Department) in a face-to-face meeting with the president agreed to issue the order as the acting attorney general and he also decided not to resign after so doing. (Note: Nixon's purported reason for firing Cox, as relayed by Haig, was that Cox had embarrassed Nixon during sensitive negotiations during the Middle East war. Richardson's advice to Bork, not to resign, or at least not to resign after firing Cox, was an important factor for Bork. But "[w]hy Bork acted as he did, exactly how he acted, and what were the consequences of his acts, became matters of some dispute.") As for the termination itself, Bork sent a written order to Cox by messenger that evening to Cox's home. (Note: Richardson called Cox earlier that afternoon, informing him that he and Ruckelshaus had resigned and that Bork would be firing him. Cox explained: "Sometime further on, the phone rang and it was the White House operator trying to get our address, and letting us know there was a letter to be delivered. And the messenger got lost in nearby Virginia. Instead of getting there in 20 minutes as he could have, it took him more than an hour. I think when I got the letter, the first thing I said to my wife and daughter was, 'I think they at least owed it to me to send me somebody with a jacket and necktie.' That's the kind of silly remark you make in moments of emotion … I was much more concerned about the issues.")

The White House then fatally overplayed its hand. At 8:25 p.m. press secretary Ron Ziegler announced what would become known as the "Saturday Night Massacre." He explained that Cox had been fired, but added, somewhat gratuitously (and, as it would ultimately transpire, inaccurately), "the office of the Special Prosecution Force has been abolished as of approximately 8 P.M. tonight." Haig compounded the bad publicity by publicly sealing the offices of the Special Prosecutor as well as those of Richardson and Ruckelshaus. He explained his conduct by saying: "You would turn the country into a banana republic if you allowed defiance of the president." To Judge Sirica, who watched it on television, it was the cordoning off of the Special Prosecutor's offices that looked like part of a Latin American coup. Fred Emery wrote for the Times of London that there was "a whiff of the Gestapo in the chill October air." FBI agents showed up at the Special Prosecutor's offices at 9:00 p.m. and briefly prevented deputy prosecutor Henry Ruth from entering. Staffers inside were told they were not permitted to remove any documents, official or personal. At a hastily arranged press conference in the library of the building, Ruth and Doyle explained that they had taken copies of major memos to a safe place the night before, but that they were concerned about the vast amount of material still in the office that had not been presented to the grand jury. Doyle read Cox's statement on his termination: "Whether we shall continue to be a Government of laws and not of men is now for Congress and ultimately the American people."

Front page of the New York Times, October 21, 1973, announcing the Saturday Night Massacre amid mounting tensions between the United States and the Soviet Union over possible armed conflict in the Middle East.

The actions of Nixon and his aides that night produced "results precisely the opposite to what the president and his lawyers had anticipated." Instead of simply removing Cox, "they raised a 'firestorm' of protest that permanently scarred Nixon's credibility with the public, and, most damagingly, with Congressional Republicans and Southern Democrats." Public reaction, even though it was a holiday weekend, was swift and overwhelming. About 450,000 telegrams and cables reached the White House and Congress. Mail and wires were put in bundles then sorted by state. The deluge eclipsed any previous record. Outside the White House, marchers held signs saying "Honk for Impeachment"; car horns were heard in downtown Washington day and night for two weeks. But more concerning to the White House must have been the political reaction. On Sunday John B. Anderson, Chairman of the House Republican Conference, predicted that "impeachment resolutions are going to be raining down like hailstorms." George H. W. Bush, then Chairman of the Republican National Committee, was so concerned over the electoral consequences that he visited the White House, hoping to persuade the president to rehire Richardson for damage control, perhaps as ambassador to the U.S.S.R. On Tuesday, Speaker Carl Albert began referring impeachment resolutions to the House Judiciary Committee with the consent of Gerald Ford. Nixon lawyer Leonard Garment said that the White House was paralyzed. "[H]e thought of little else except to marvel 'over the mischief we had wrought and the public relations disaster we had brought on ourselves.'"

In the end, Nixon did not even achieve the short-term tactical benefit the maneuver was designed to afford him. On Tuesday afternoon eleven lawyers from the Special Prosecutor's force convened with Wright and Buzhardt in the courtroom of Judge Sirica, for further proceedings on the subpoenas. That weekend Sirica drafted an order to show cause why Nixon should not be held in contempt. He was thinking of a $25,000 to $50,000 a day fine until the president complied. To everyone's amazement, Wright announced that the president was prepared to produce all the material ordered. Not long afterward, Leon Jaworski would be appointed Special Prosecutor and, because of Nixon's wounded public standing, was given even more independence than Cox had. Cox would not be part of any of it, however, for after a brief farewell meeting with his staff (whom Jaworski would keep), advising them how important it was that they continue and assuring them of Jaworski's good faith, (Note: Jaworski at Robert Kennedy's request prosecuted Governor Ross Barnett of Mississippi for contempt over the integration of the University of Mississippi by Medger Evers. Cox had been so impressed with his integrity (as a Southerner taking on a segregationist politician) and his talent that he split his argument time with him before the Supreme Court.) he and Phyllis drove off in their pickup truck to their place in Brooksville, Maine.

Cox's colleague and friend Philip Heymann described the effect of that weekend from Cox's address, through the massacre and the reaction:

President Nixon asked the country to understand his firing an honest prosecutor so that he could get on with national security business. Cox spoke to the American people about the primacy of the rule of law even during a near-confrontation with the Soviet Union over the Yom Kippur war. Unfrightened, unpretentious, talking from the very depths of his convictions and loyalties to hundreds of millions of individual Americans as one citizen to another, Archie reversed a congressional retreat and found a nation following him along the path of freedom. The people and the Congress rallied to the cause of a professor who, without a hint of anger, spoke mildly about our history and principles, and who made clear that what would happen to him was not an issue. After that the executive was again bound by the laws that make men free, and Archie became a national symbol of the triumph of law.

Cox's case on the tapes did not go to the Supreme Court, but when the president tried to resist a later subpoena by Jaworski, the case made its way to the Court. On July 24, 1974, only three days after oral argument, United States Supreme Court voted by 8 to 0 to reject Nixon's claims of executive privilege and enforced the subpoena requiring the release of the tapes. (Note: United States v. Nixon, 418 U.S. 683 (1974) (opinion by Chief Justice Burger, joined in by all except Associate Justice William H. Rehnquist who did not participate in the deliberations). Justice Rehnquist had recused himself on the ground that as an assistant attorney general during Nixon's first term, he had taken part in internal executive-branch discussions of the scope of executive privilege.) Fifteen days later Nixon announced his decision to resign as president effective the next day, August 8, 1974. Many legal experts outside of the United States were shocked at how legal process, particularly one issued at the request of a subordinate official, could require the head of state to do anything. Cox wrote of one scholar who said: "It is unthinkable that the courts of any country should issue an order to its Chief of State." Cox spent much of the rest of his career writing on the unique place of the Court in the American system of government. As for this particular case, when it was all over, Times legal correspondent Anthony Lewis gave chief credit for the extraordinary result to Cox:

If Cox and his staff had not been so able and dogged, they easily could have fallen in a dozen procedural holes along the way in the tapes case. …But plainly there was more to that Saturday night and its aftermath. It all depended on public attitudes—and they in turn depended on the public's reading of one man's character. I am convinced myself that the character of Archibald Cox was essential to the result. Nixon and his men never understood it; they assumed that Cox must be a conspirator, like them, when he was so straight as to approach naivete. [Cox said on taking the job]: "I think sometimes it is effective not to be nasty, in a nasty world—although it may take a little while for people to realize that."

== After Watergate ==
=== Teaching again ===
Cox spent the academic year from September 1974 to spring 1975 at the University of Cambridge as the Pitt Professor of American History and Institutions. (Note: The professorship had been offered before Cox's appointment as Watergate prosecutor. Cox chose to deliver lectures at Sidney Sussex College.) During that year Cox and his wife were able to travel throughout Britain and Ireland meeting judges, lawyers and other dignitaries. Cox lectured to packed houses, including at Oxford where he delivered the Chichele Lectures at All Souls College. The Coxes also occasionally socialized with the Richardsons, Elliot having been appointed by President Ford as the Ambassador to the Court of St James's. They were even able to spend a weekend in Scotland with David Graham-Campbell, the commander of the corps that Cox's brother Robert served in when he died during World War II.

When Cox returned to Harvard in the fall of 1975 he returned to teaching and writing full-time. His interests were now almost exclusively constitutional law, but he occasionally would teach a course in labor law. Faculty members and students noticed a change in his style of teaching. Whereas once he was known as the austere, dominating law professor drilling students with the Socratic method, and even was considered a possible basis for the fictional Professor Kingsfield, he was now referred to in student evaluations as "interesting, kind, decent." Derek Bok concluded: "He developed an affection for people."

=== Judicial reform ===
Cox's outside activities shifted from arbitration to government reform and appellate advocacy. In 1975, court reform was a top priority in Massachusetts where criminal cases had backlogged the system, which (because they required priority) resulted in even greater congestion of civil cases. Cox was appointed to a Massachusetts Bar committee to study the problem. in February 1976 Governor Michael Dukakis appointed Cox to head the 20 member Governor's Select Committee on Judicial Needs to make recommendations. In December the committee issued the Cox-drafted report, entitled "Report on the State of the Massachusetts Court." The Report's most important recommendations were a structuring of the District Courts, state assumption of the administrative costs of the courts, placing management of the court system in the hands of the chief justice of the Supreme Judicial Court, abolition of trials de novo in appeals from the District Court and tightening of the rules for remand and continuances. Despite the fact that the Governor made judicial reform along the lines of the Cox report his "top" legislative priority for 1976, and despite the fact that the proposal was supported by the newspapers of the state, and despite intense lobbying efforts by Cox himself (not only in testimony before the legislatures but also in numerous speaking events throughout the state) over the course of 1976, the legislation ultimately ran out of time in the 1977 legislative session. (Note: The recommendations faced an uphill battle through Massachusetts byzantine politics. The major problems were (i) the balkanized judicial system gave hundreds of independent enclaves of patronage, so the judiciary (including clerks and other officers) had no interest in reform; (ii) there existed a "terrible hatred" between the Governor and the chairman of the Senate Judiciary Committee (both of whom supported reform, and the chairmen and between the Senate and House Judiciary Committees (the later of which opposed reform); and (iii) the House kept inserting poison pills that would make the legislation unconstitutional (namely, making certain judges elected rather than appointed) and reusing to include a severability provision. Late in the legislative season Cox tried to persuade the state's selectmen at an annual gathering that the bill would substantially ease their own budgets and benefit local governments especially, but the association ignored the plea in its legislative requests. Ultimately the bill failed in the Senate when the term ran out during a filibuster.) In the next session the bill was drastically revised, but ultimately retained the state take-over of funding and implemented some centralization and coordination.

=== Supreme Court advocate ===
Just as his public support for Udall was uncharacteristic, after Watergate Cox was more open to represent groups not a part of traditional institutions. (Note: For example, in early 1977 Cox agreed to help an advocacy group for native Americans who were pressing the claims of the Passamaquoddy and Penobscot against the state of Maine for land acquisition. The claims were ultimately settled for $81.5 million through the adoption of the Maine Indian Claims Settlement Act of 1980.) But Cox's chief interest was always in Supreme Court advocacy. And he would argue two more landmark cases.

The first of the cases arose out of the 1974 amendments of the Federal Election Campaign Act of 1971. These amendments were a response to the campaign finance abuses of Nixon's Committee for the Re-Election of the President, which Cox was familiar with as Special Watergate Prosecutor. (Note: The president's counsel, Herb Kalmbach, was able to raise large and illegal contribution from numerous corporations and commercial groups, and following the contributions the contributors received significant government benefits: The Milk Producers Association pledged $2 million at the same time the Nixon Administration increased the support price of milk. American Airlines received approval for certain profitable routes right after an illegal contribution. ITT agreed to underwrite the Republican National Convention and an antitrust suit by the government was dropped after a direct order by the president to Richard Kleindienst.) The amendments provided for financial reporting by federal campaigns, established a variety of contribution and spending limitations and provided for public funding of presidential campaigns. A variety of plaintiffs sued, claiming the regulatory scheme violated their right to free speech. In 1975 the case reached the Supreme Court, and Senators Edward Kennedy and Hugh Scott requested Cox to file an amicus brief on their behalf. Common Cause had intervened as a party in the lower court and therefore had time a right to argue before the Court, but its counsel Lloyd Cutler disagreed with the position taken by the organization (which supported the amendments) and Cox was asked to argue on its behalf.

Cox's key argument was that the contribution of money, even when done to enable public discourse is not "speech" but rather "conduct." Nor was total campaign spending, even though part of it was used to enable "speech." In light of the realities of escalating campaign contributions, Congress had a right to regulate this conduct to reduce corruption and to counter public cynicism in the electoral process. Cox argued that such conduct should be subject to a lesser standard of court review than the strict scrutiny of restrictions on pure political speech. The Court's decision in the case, known as Buckley v. Valeo, was an eclectic array of separate opinions on various parts of the amendments, with only a brief per curiam decision tallying the votes on each issue. (Note: The principal regulations were as follows: (i) prohibition on individuals against contributing more than $1,000 to any one candidate per election; (ii) prohibition on multi-candidate committees against contributing more than $5,000 to one candidate; (iii) prohibition on candidates against contributing above set ceilings from personal or family funds; (iv) prohibition on aggregate spending by a campaign above a set amount; (v) prohibition on individual against spending above $1,000 on behalf of a candidate regardless whether it was in coordination with the campaign; (vi) provision for federal financing of campaign under certain conditions, including that candidate agrees to spending limits; (vii) prohibition on "election committee" against spending more than $1,000 on any candidate who has elected public financing. The Court held that (i) the reporting requirements were constitutional; (ii) the restrictions on contributions were constitutional; (iii) restrictions on spending by the campaign or individuals (except those in coordination with a campaign that accepted the voluntary restrictions as a condition for public financing) were unconstitutional; and (iv) the provisions for public financing of presidential elections were constitutional.) The Court rejected Cox's approach. As Justice White put it in dissent, the Court held that 'money talks" without considering the variety of ways that federal laws regulate speech in other contexts. Nevertheless, while it voided limits on campaign spending, it upheld contribution limits, financial reporting requirements and the conditions to financing of presidential campaigns. John W. Gardner, the chairman of Common Cause called it a victory for those who "worked so hard to clean up politics in this country."

The second significant case Cox participated in dealt with affirmative action. In 1976 the California Supreme Court had ruled that the University of California, Davis Medical School had violated the Equal Protection Clause of the Fourteenth Amendment to the United States Constitution by failing to admit Allan Bakke, a 37-year-old white engineering student, who claimed that he was barred by a "racial quota." The trustees sought out Cox to argue the case in the Supreme Court. Cox, who had already prepared a brief on the issue in the DeFunis case, agreed to take the case on the condition that other lawyers take primary responsibility for preparing the brief, something highly unusual for Cox who normally carefully supervised and revised anything that went to the Court under his name, but necessary because of the work involved on the Massachusetts court reform committee. When the case came on to be argued, on October 12, 1977, Cox was in the midst of his heaviest schedule yet of lobbying for the reform bill, with the legislative session over after the holidays. The crux of his argument was to separate two questions facing universities who had fewer places available than qualified candidates: 1) Which candidates are capable of benefiting from the education provided by the school? and 2) From that group, what characteristics can the school employ to make sure a class benefits itself, the school and the community? It is the confusion of the two questions that gives rise to the claim that a "quota" exists.

Cox opened his Bakke argument by stating these questions in a way that put the case at its most forceful; namely, that unless the Court permitted universities to take race into account to promote minority participation in learned professions, they would be excluded except for a very small number. (Note: Cox opened by stating the case as follows: "This case … presents a single, vital question: whether a state university, which is forced by limited resources to select a relatively small number of students from a much larger number of well-qualified applicants, is free, voluntarily, to take into account the fact that a qualified applicant is black, Chicano, Asian, or native American, in order to increase the number of qualified members of those minority groups trained for the educated professions and participating in them, professions from which minorities were long excluded because of generations of pervasive racial discrimination.") The case, known as Regents of the University of California v. Bakke produced several opinions: four justices opined that taking race into account was never permissible; four, on the other hand, that it was permissible if "benign." Justice Lewis Powell, whose plurality opinion was joined by the different groups in different parts, tried to thread the needle. While he rejected a fixed number of acceptances (a so-called "quota"), and thus affirmed Bakke's admission in this case, he also answered Cox's framing of the question in the affirmative and said that universities are entitled to take race into account as one factor among many. Assistant Attorney General Drew S. Days, III, who watched the argument felt that Cox's presence was crucial as a symbol of the "establishment" assuring the Court (and the conservative Justice Powell) that the position was not "outlandish." Powell's approach opinion underlies the approach of most university affirmative actions policies today. (Note: There was much debate whether Powell's opinion on race as a permissible "plus factor," represented a holding of the Court inasmuch as it was not joined in by other justices. That doubt was removed by Grutter v. Bollinger, 539 U.S. 306 (2003), where Justice Sandra Day O'Connor re-affirmed Justice Powell's reasoning in an opinion for the Court. Cox's friend and colleague Charles Ogeltree attributes the survival of affirmative action programs in universities to Cox's forceful argument in Bakke.)

=== Judicial politics ===
In late 1978 a new seat became available in the United States Court of Appeals for the First Circuit (the federal appellate court sitting in Boston) when Congress expanded the federal judiciary by 152 judges. Observers expected Senator Kennedy to avail himself of the tradition allowing the Senator of the president's political party to name federal judges in his state to propose Archibald Cox. In March 1979 a panel of lawyers appointed by President Carter unanimously recommended Cox as their first choice among five for the nomination. Cox was highly doubtful, however, that Carter would appoint him in light of his prominent support of Udall three years earlier, but nevertheless filled out the application and submitted to background checks. Then in June the New York Times reported that the nomination was "stalled." Some anonymous sources claimed that Attorney General Griffin Bell objected to the nomination on the ground that Cox at 67 was too old, noting that the ABA suggested that no one over 64 be named to the job. Another suggested that behind this rationale was antagonisms between Bell and Cox dating back to when Cox was Solicitor General and Bell was an appellate court judge in the south. Another source said that the Justice Department was holding up the appointment because Kennedy was attempting to assert undue influence as Chairman of the Senate Judiciary Committee, who had the ability to block appointments across the country. Publicly, however, all the parties insisted that the delay was nothing out of the ordinary.

Within the White House Cox had his defenders who argued strongly against the "rule of 64" and even obtained an opinion that the ABA would not object to Cox's appointment. Kennedy even spoke personally to Carter, urging that the appointment would redound to the president's political benefit, but Carter told him he would not appoint Cox. When the decision was made members of Carter's own judicial selection publicly expressed their anger over the decision. (Note: One member said that "[i]t bothers me ... because he ... disregarded what the commission was trying to do—select the positively best person." Common Cause's counsel termed the behavior "awfully petty." The National Journal concluded the affair demonstrated that when Carter and his aides "bungle something, they don't do it half way." It showed lack of statesmanship and competence at a time when Carter's hold on the nomination, let alone re-election, was slipping.) Carter's 1976 New York campaign manager listed the failure to appoint Cox as one of several ways in which the Administration had "behaved foolishly" simply to snub Kennedy. The following year another panel assembled by Carter asked Cox if he wished again to apply for a judgeship. Cox quickly turned down offer of interest. His colleague Stephen Breyer obtained the appointment.

=== Common Cause ===
His judicial ambitions over, Cox turned his energies to leading outside advocacy and policy-making groups. In 1980 Cox was elected chairman of Common Cause, the 230,000 member citizens' lobby, as John Gardner's successor. Cox wrote that "[t]he challenge was to reshape the machinery of self-government … so that every citizen knows that he or she can participate and that his or her participation counts ... ." That same year he also became the founding chairman of the Health Effects Institute, a partnership between the Environmental Protection Agency and private automobile and truck manufacturers to study the effects of emissions from motor vehicles. Cox said that the organization was designed to take the testing and scientific research concerning the health effects of this type of pollution "out of the adversarial context."

It was as head of Common Cause, however, that he was to make his final mark; his goal was to make government more transparent and responsible to the broad public rather than special interests in order to restore faith in government institutions. The very day he took office, the Abscam affair was leaked. While Cox personally deplored the leak, he immediately sent letters to congressional leaders underlining "the urgent necessity of looking into the charges to demonstrate that Congress is concerned about its honor and integrity." In July 1980 the organization instituted its first major litigation under Cox, and it was a follow-up on Buckley v. Valeo: Common Cause sued the four "independent" groups that promised to spend between $38 and $58 million for television and print advertisements in support of the election of Ronald Reagan, even though he agreed to abide by spending limits of $29.4 million as part of the agreement he made in accepting public financing. Right to work groups used the occasion to criticize Cox for attacking voluntary independent expenditures while ignoring union efforts on behalf of candidates. The D.C. District Court dismissed the case on the ground that any restrictions on "independent" spending amounted to an unconstitutional abridgment of freedom of speech. The Supreme Court, affirmed the decision by an equally divided court (Justice O'Connor not participating). That case would be Cox's last argument before the Supreme Court. (Note: Gormley determined that Cox argued 86 cases before the Court in his career, winning 61, losing 18 with 7 split decisions,)

Conservatives' complaints against Common Cause became more general and more numerous from that summer to fall when the organization celebrated its tenth anniversary. Henry Fairlie published in the June issue of Harper's a broad (but largely unspecific) complaint against the organization for representing all that was wrong with American politics: "The underlying thrust of Common Cause reforms has been to weaken the political role of the very associations that give power to the otherwise powerless, and in the name of this misguided notion of participatory democracy Common Cause increases the opportunities of the already influential to extend their privileges." Tom Bethell (Washington editor of Harper's) wrote in the Times " The concept of 'reform' itself is beginning to be viewed with skepticism. Writers are more and more inclined to put the word inside quotation marks. In Washington these days, one often hears references to 'the unintended consequences of reform. Cox responded in an address on September 6, 1980: It was not reforms that were the problem, but rather incomplete implementation of them. The flood of money into national political campaigns was not the result of campaign finance reform, but of inadequate regulation of "independent" committees that informally coordinated with the campaigns. "[D]amaging and dangerous as the rising rate of influence of political action committee contributions is … the present law is clearly preferable to the old pre-Watergate conditions."

Cox continued his campaign against large campaign contributions, but he was largely unsuccessful in effecting any further change. He also supported efforts to increase voter participation by testifying in favor of bilingual ballots

After twelve years at the helm, Cox, at 79, chose to retire from the chairmanship of Common Cause as of February 1992.

=== Retirement ===
Having taught for two years beyond Harvard's mandatory retirement age, Cox was finally forced to retire from the Harvard Law School faculty at the end of the 1983–84 school year. Cox wryly said: "I won't be allowed to teach anymore. I'm presumed to be senile." He then accepted a teaching position at Boston University School of Law, which arranged a specific retirement policy for Cox; according to Dean Ronald A. Cass: "He teaches as long as he wants to."

== Death ==
Cox died at his home in Brooksville, Maine, of natural causes on May 29, 2004, at 92. He and his wife, Phyllis, had been married for 67 years; the couple had two daughters and a son. Phyllis died on February 6, 2007.

== Published works ==
In addition to his case book, he was the author of nearly a hundred scholarly articles.

== Honors ==
=== Chaired and university professorships ===
During his career at Harvard, Professor Cox was honored with the following chaired or university professorships:

- 1958–61, Royall Professor, Harvard Law School
- 1965–76, Williston Professor, Harvard Law School
- 1976–84, Carl M. Loeb University Professor, Harvard University
- 1984–his death, Carl M. Loeb University Professor, Emeritus, Harvard University

=== Honorary degrees ===
Throughout his life Cox was the recipient of numerous honorary degrees, including: M.A.: Sidney Sussex College, University Cambridge, England 1974; L.H.D.: Hahnemann Medical College, Philadelphia, 1980; LL.D: Loyola University Chicago, 1964, University of Cincinnati, 1967, University of Denver, 1974, Amherst College, 1974, Rutgers, 1974, Harvard University, 1975, Michigan State, 1976, Wheaton College, 1977, Northeastern University, 1978, Clark, 1980, University of Massachusetts Amherst, 1981, University of Notre Dame, 1983, University of Illinois, 1985, Claremont Graduate School, 1987, Colby College, 1988.

=== Honorary societies ===
Cox was elected member to or granted recognition by the following societies:

- Elected a Fellow of the American Academy of Arts and Sciences in 1955.
- Delivered the Harvard Phi Beta Kappa Oration during the literary exercises before commencement in June 1974
- Elected member of the American Philosophical Society in 1980. Member of the Committee on Phillips Prize 1982–88.
- Awarded Outstanding Scholar Award by the American Bar Foundation in 1993.

=== Other honors ===
In 1935 Cox won the Sears Prize for his performance during first year in law school.

After he resigned his faculty position at Harvard and until he returned in 1965, Cox served as a member of Harvard's Board of Overseers.

In 1991 the faculty of Harvard Law School made Cox an honorary member of the Order of the Coif, an historic group that recognizes significant contributions to the legal profession.

In 1995 the Institute of Government and Public Affairs awarded Cox its Ethics in Government Award. Cox was also the recipient of the Thomas "Tip" O'Neill Citizenship Award.

On January 8, 2001, Cox was presented with the Presidential Citizens Medal by President Bill Clinton, saying: "Archibald Cox, every American, whether he or she knows your name or not, owes you a profound debt of thanks for a lifetime of your service to your country and its Constitution."

== Notes ==
Legal offices
Preceded by J. Lee Rankin	Solicitor General of the United States; 1961–1965	Succeeded by Thurgood Marshall
