= Leon Jaworski =

American prosecutor (1905–1982)

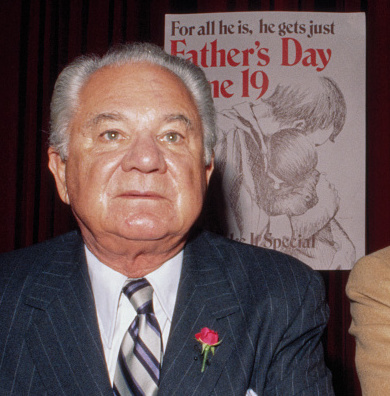
- Jaworski in 1977

Special Prosecutor for the United States Department of Justice
- In office November 1, 1973 – October 25, 1974
- Appointed by: Robert Bork
- Deputy: Henry S. Ruth Jr.
- Preceded by: Archibald Cox
- Succeeded by: Henry S. Ruth Jr.

Personal details
- Born: Leonidas Jaworski; September 19, 1905 Waco, Texas, U.S.
- Died: December 9, 1982 (aged 77) Wimberley, Texas, U.S.
- Party: Democratic
- Education: Baylor University (LLB); George Washington University (LLM)

Leonidas "Leon" Jaworski (September 19, 1905 – December 9, 1982) was an American attorney and law professor who served as the second special prosecutor during the Watergate scandal. He was appointed to that position on November 1, 1973, soon after the "Saturday Night Massacre" of October 19–20, 1973, which included the dismissal of his predecessor Archibald Cox.

== Background ==
Jaworski was born in Waco in central Texas. His mother, Marie (Mira), was an Austrian immigrant, and his father, Joseph Jaworski, was a Polish immigrant who was an evangelical minister. He was named after ancient Spartan king Leonidas, and had a brother named Hannibal. An earnest student who studied at night by the light of oil lamps, he was a champion debater at Waco High School, graduated from Baylor Law School, and received his master's degree in law at the George Washington University Law School in Washington, D.C.

== Legal career ==
In 1925, he became the youngest person ever admitted to the Texas bar. After starting out defending bootleggers during Prohibition, in 1931, he joined the Houston law firm that became Fulbright & Jaworski, one of the largest law firms in the United States. Jaworski served as president of both the Texas Bar Association (1962–1963) and the American Bar Association (1971–1972) prior to his appointment as Special Prosecutor. He was also President of the Houston Chamber of Commerce in 1960 and served on many corporate and civic boards. Jaworski served in the United States Army and served in the judge advocate office. He rose to the rank of colonel.

In 1964, Jaworski attended hearings of the Warren Commission regarding the assassination of President Kennedy as Special Counsel to the Attorney General of Texas, Waggoner Carr.

== World War II ==
During World War II, Jaworski served in the United States Army's judge advocate general's office, reaching the rank of colonel. He led the prosecution in multiple cases, including the Johannes Kunze murder trial, where five German prisoners of war were accused of beating a fellow prisoner to death for being a "traitor".

=== Fort Lawton court-martial ===
On the night of August 14, 1944, the Fort Lawton riot between African-American U.S. soldiers and Italian prisoners of war at Fort Lawton near Seattle resulted in the lynching of Italian POW Guglielmo Olivotto. Thereafter, Jaworski prosecuted forty-three African-American soldiers, of whom twenty-eight were convicted, in what was the longest U.S. Army court-martial of World War II. In 2007 the U.S. Army Board for Correction of Military Records ordered all those convictions reversed on the grounds that Jaworski had committed "egregious error".

=== War crimes prosecutor ===
After the war, Jaworski served as a war crimes prosecutor in Germany. He was involved in a case where eleven German civilians were accused of murdering six American airmen forced down over Germany in the Rüsselsheim massacre, and a case involving people who were complicit in mass murder at the Hadamar Euthanasia Centre. However, Jaworski declined to participate in the Nuremberg Trials on the grounds that the prosecution there was based on laws that did not exist at the time of the culpable acts.

== Political connections ==
A Democrat, Jaworski was a friend of fellow Texan Lyndon B. Johnson, whom he successfully represented in a 1960 lawsuit filed to prevent Johnson from campaigning for the U.S. Senate against Republican John Tower at the same time that Johnson was running for Vice President of the United States on the John F. Kennedy ticket. However, Jaworski did not always support Democratic candidates. He supported Richard Nixon and voted for him twice, contributed to George H. W. Bush in his campaign for the presidency in 1980, and after Bush conceded the nomination he became treasurer of "Democrats for Reagan" during the 1980 general election campaign.

Having been convinced of his integrity, in 1980, Jaworski aided former Nixon staffer Egil "Bud" Krogh, whom he had sent to prison in 1973, in Krogh's request to be reinstated to the bar in Washington state.

== Watergate ==
On November 1, 1973, Jaworski became the Special Prosecutor in the Watergate scandal, assuming leadership of a protracted contest with President Nixon to secure evidence for the trial of former senior administration officials on charges relating to the Watergate scandal.

Jaworski's predecessor as Special Prosecutor, Archibald Cox, initially believed that only Nixon's aides had committed misconduct. Because of testimony from Nixon's deputy assistant Alexander Butterfield, Cox learned that Nixon had discussed the Watergate cover-up with the accused on numerous occasions and that these conversations had been recorded by the White House taping system. This discovery caused Cox to subpoena tapes of several presidential conversations as evidence for the upcoming criminal trial, but Nixon refused to release them, citing executive privilege.

Nixon offered Cox what became known as the Stennis Compromise: instead of supplying the tapes, he would supply Cox with transcripts of the recordings, subject to Nixon's discretion, and allow one senator to listen to the recordings and verify the transcripts' accuracy. Cox rejected the compromise, whereupon Nixon orchestrated the firing of Cox in the (widely called, but informally named) Saturday Night Massacre using Acting Attorney General Robert Bork.

On November 1, 1973, Bork announced he selected, and Nixon approved, Jaworski to replace Cox. Jaworski subsequently subpoenaed sixty-four taped conversations. Nixon appealed on two grounds: first, that the office of Special Prosecutor did not have the right to sue the office of President; and second, that the requested materials were privileged presidential conversations. Aware that an important constitutional issue was at stake, and unwilling to wait any longer, Jaworski asked the Supreme Court to take the case directly, bypassing the Court of Appeals.

Nixon Oval Office meeting with H. R. Haldeman "Smoking Gun" conversation June 23, 1972 Full transcript

On July 24, 1974, the Supreme Court ruled that the Special Prosecutor did have the right to sue the President; and that the "generalized assertion of [executive] privilege must yield to the demonstrated, specific need for evidence in a pending criminal trial". Nixon was forced to give the unedited tapes to Jaworski, including the so-called Smoking Gun Tape which included a compromising discussion of June 23, 1972. The President's remaining support waned, and he resigned on August 9, 1974.

In the summer of 1982, seven members of the grand jury choose to break their oath of silence because "they [were] convinced justice was not done" and discussed their 30-month service with the ABC news show 20/20. They stated they wanted to bring an indictment against Pres. Nixon after hearing the batch of tapes released in the summer of 1974. One grand juror stated that in a straw vote, "There were 19 people in the grand-jury room that particular day, and we all raised our hands about wanting an indictment—all of us. And some of us raised both hands." However, Jaworski did not favor an indictment, even going so far as saying he would not sign one. In discussions with the grand jury, Jaworski cited "the trauma of the country", and prior to Nixon's resignation, the lack of precedent for indicting a sitting president.

== Later years ==
Jaworski resigned as special prosecutor on October 25, 1974, once the cover-up trial had begun, and a new special prosecutor was appointed. Jaworski was a close friend of Dean Ernest Raba of St. Mary's University School of Law in San Antonio, where he taught as an adjunct professor for several years.

In 1977, Jaworski reluctantly agreed to serve as special counsel to a House Ethics Committee investigation to determine whether members had indirectly or directly accepted anything of value from the government of the Republic of Korea. The investigation, known as Koreagate or the Tongsun Park investigation, potentially involved hundreds of members of Congress and their families and associates, and included charges of bribery and influence-peddling via envelopes stuffed with $100 bills.

Jaworski died on December 9, 1982, while chopping wood at the Circle J Ranch near Wimberley in Hays County, Texas. His wife died in 1999. His son, Joseph Jaworski, is a former lawyer turned best-selling author and leadership expert. His grandson is political journalist and author Robert Draper. His other grandson is Joe Jaworski, a former mayor of Galveston who ran in 2022 for Texas Attorney General.

== Awards and honors ==
In 1971, Jaworski received the Golden Plate Award of the American Academy of Achievement.

In 1988, the HBAA Leon Jaworski Award was initiated to honor a lawyer for a lifetime of volunteer service. State and national bar associations reward professional achievement; the granting of the Jaworski Award is based solely on service to the greater Houston community. The award is named for Leon Jaworski whose life and achievements reflected a deep commitment to public service.

== Publications ==
- Jaworski, Leon, After Fifteen Years, Houston: Gulf Publishing Company, 1961.
- Jaworski, Leon, The Right and the Power, New York: Reader's Digest Press, 1976.
- Jaworski, Leon and Herskowitz, Mickey, Confession and Avoidance: A Memoir, Garden City, NY: Anchor Press, 1979.
- Jaworski, Leon, Crossroads, Elgin, Ill.: Cook Press, 1981.
