= Joseph A. Loftus =

American journalist

Joseph A. Loftus (1907 – January 3, 1990) was a 20th-century American reporter for The New York Times who covered unions, like the International Brotherhood of Teamsters, extensively and later worked as a communications assistant to George P. Shultz at the U.S. Department of Labor and U.S. Department of the Treasury.

== Background ==
Joseph A. Loftus was born in Scranton, Pennsylvania, and had one brother and three sisters. In 1928, he graduated from the University of Scranton with a bachelor's degree. While a student, he worked the Scranton Tribune and the International News Service. In 1931, he obtained a degree from the Columbia University Graduate School of Journalism.

== Career ==
=== Journalism ===
In 1936, Loftus moved to Washington, DC to work for the Associated Press as a journalist. Tackling politics, economics and labor for the Washington Bureau, he began working at The New York Times in 1944. His coverage included the downfall of Ware Group member of Progressive Party Lee Pressman in February 1948. He covered union news extensively, like the International Brotherhood of Teamsters. In 1954, he appeared as a talk show panelist on Longines Chronoscope. In the late '50s he covered the James Hoffa / Teamsters Union hearings and through that assignment met Robert Kennedy. Through Kennedy as a professional and personal friend he met the older brother Jack. In the spring of 1960 the NY Times made Loftus the reporter for Kennedy's campaign and then traveled the country with the candidate up through the election. Afterwards the NYTs made Loftus the White House reporter which he then covered through the assassination and into the Johnson administration. In 1969, he resigned from the paper.

=== Government ===
In 1969, Loftus became a communications specialist to Secretary of Labor George P. Shultz as part of the presidential administration of the newly elected Richard Nixon. Loftus moved with Shultz to the Treasury Department.

== Awards ==
He was awarded the first Louis Stark scholarship as a Nieman Fellow to Harvard University in 1960.

== Personal life and death ==
Loftus married twice, both wives were named Mary and he had two daughters with his first wife. He moved to Sarasota, Florida, in 1983.

On January 3, 1990, at age 82, he died at home after a series of strokes.
