= Saturday Night Massacre =

1973 Watergate scandal resignations

- Part of Watergate scandal
- Front page of The New York Times, October 21, 1973, announcing the dismissal of Cox and the departure of Richardson and Ruckelshaus
- Date: October 20, 1973
- Type: Serial resignations
- Cause: Protest of order to fire special prosecutor Archibald Cox
- Participants: Elliot Richardson; William Ruckelshaus
- Outcome: Cox ultimately fired (ruled illegal)

The "Saturday Night Massacre" was the climactic series of events during the Watergate scandal that occurred on Saturday, October 20, 1973. It involved a series of resignations within the United States Department of Justice in protest of President Richard Nixon's order to fire special prosecutor Archibald Cox, who was investigating Nixon's involvement in Watergate. The events followed the refusal by Cox to drop a subpoena for the Nixon White House tapes at Nixon's request.

During a single evening on Saturday, October 20, Nixon ordered Attorney General Elliot Richardson to fire Archibald Cox; Richardson refused and resigned in protest, effective immediately. Nixon then ordered Deputy Attorney General William Ruckelshaus to fire Cox; Ruckelshaus also refused, and resigned in protest. Nixon then ordered the third-most-senior official at the Justice Department, Solicitor General Robert Bork, to fire Cox. Bork carried out the dismissal as Nixon asked. Bork stated that he had intended to resign afterward, but was persuaded by Richardson and Ruckelshaus to stay on for the good of the Justice Department. The impeachment process against Nixon began ten days later, on October 30, 1973. Leon Jaworski was appointed as the new special prosecutor on November 1, 1973, and on November 14, 1973, United States district judge Gerhard Gesell ruled that the dismissal had been illegal.

The Saturday Night Massacre was a brief yet significant constitutional crisis that marked the turning point of the Watergate scandal. The political and public reactions to Nixon's actions were negative and highly damaging to the president. Public opinion, which had previously been dormant, quickly turned against Nixon, and the president's approval ratings fell to an abysmal 27 percent. Nixon would resign the presidency 9 months and 20 days later, on August 9, 1974.

== Origin of the phrase ==
The actual origin of the phrase is unknown; it first appeared in writing two days after the events, in a Washington Post article by David S. Broder on October 22, but even in that article, Broder writes that the events were already "being called" the Saturday Night Massacre. In a 2017 article in The Washington Post, Amy B. Wang attributed the phrase to humorist Art Buchwald, based on the recollection of Sally Quinn.

== History ==
U.S. attorney general Elliot Richardson had appointed Cox in May 1973 after promising the House Judiciary Committee that he would appoint a special prosecutor to investigate the events surrounding the break-in of the Democratic National Committee's offices at the Watergate Hotel in Washington, D.C., on June 17, 1972. The appointment was created as a career reserved position in the Justice Department, meaning it came under the authority of the attorney general, who could only remove the special prosecutor "for cause", e.g., gross improprieties or malfeasance in office. Richardson had, in his confirmation hearings before the U.S. Senate, promised not to use his authority to dismiss the Watergate special prosecutor unless for cause.

When Cox issued a subpoena to Nixon, asking for copies of taped conversations recorded in the Oval Office, the president refused to comply. On October 12, 1973, the United States Court of Appeals for the District of Columbia Circuit upheld the subpoena, rejecting Nixon's claims of executive privilege. On Friday, October 19, Nixon offered what was later known as the Stennis Compromise—asking hard-of-hearing senator John C. Stennis of Mississippi to review and summarize the tapes for the special prosecutor's office. Cox refused the compromise that same evening, and it was believed that there would be a short rest in the legal maneuvering while government offices were closed for the weekend.

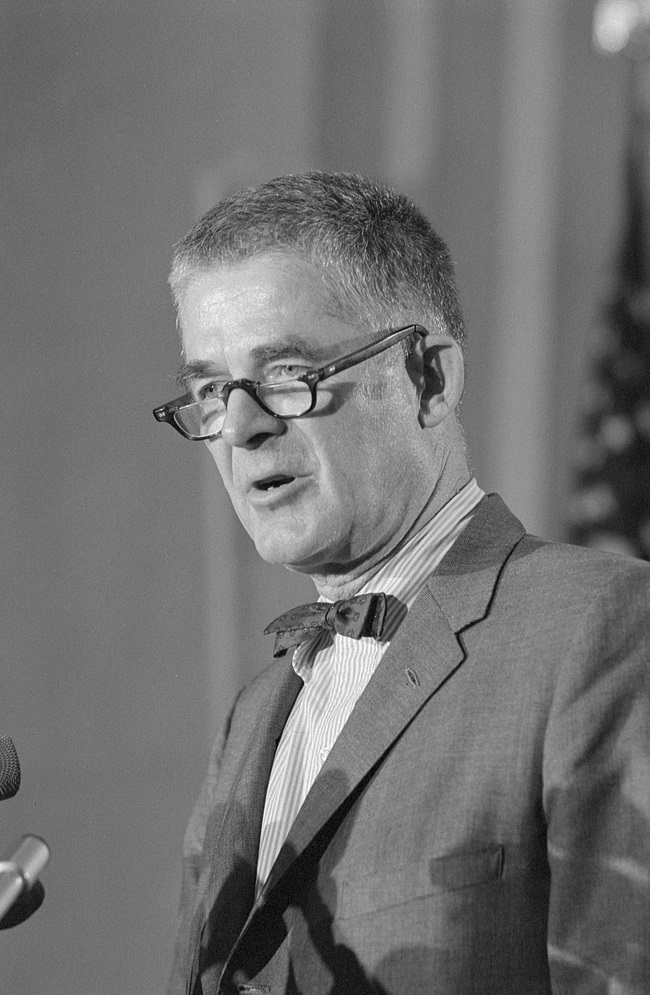
Special prosecutor Archibald Cox briefing the press at the Justice Department on June 4, 1973

However, on the following day (Saturday), Nixon ordered Attorney General Richardson to fire Cox. Richardson refused and resigned in protest. Nixon then ordered Deputy Attorney General William Ruckelshaus to fire Cox. Ruckelshaus also refused and resigned.

Nixon then ordered the solicitor general of the United States, Robert Bork, as acting head of the Justice Department, to fire Cox. Both Richardson and Ruckelshaus had given personal assurances to congressional oversight committees that they would not interfere, but Bork had not. Although Bork later claimed he believed Nixon's order to be valid and appropriate, he still considered resigning to avoid being "perceived as a man who did the President's bidding to save my job". Nevertheless, having been brought to the White House by limousine and sworn in as acting attorney general, Bork wrote the letter dismissing Cox.

== Aftermath ==
Initially, the Nixon White House claimed to have fired Ruckelshaus, but as an article published the next day by The Washington Post pointed out, "The letter from the President to Bork also said Ruckelshaus resigned", catching Nixon lying.

The night he was fired, Cox's deputy prosecutor and press aides held an impassioned news briefing and read the following statement from him, "Whether ours shall continue to be a government of laws and not of men is now for Congress and ultimately the American people [to decide]."

On November 14, 1973, federal district judge Gerhard Gesell ruled firing Cox was illegal absent a finding of extraordinary impropriety as specified in the regulation establishing the special prosecutor's office. Congress was infuriated by what it saw as a gross abuse of presidential power—as were many Americans, who sent an unusually large number of telegrams to the White House and Congress in protest.

Less than a week after the Saturday Night Massacre, an Oliver Quayle poll for NBC News indicated that, for the first time, a plurality of U.S. citizens supported impeaching Nixon, with 44% in favor, 43% opposed, and 13% undecided, with a sampling error of 2 to 3 percent.

== Impact and legacy ==
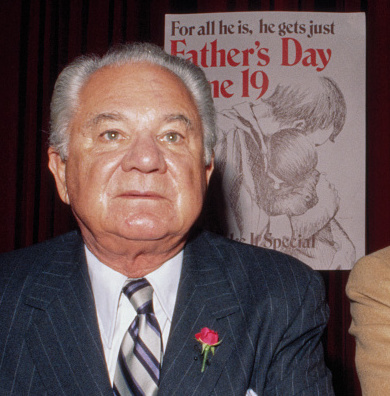
Leon Jaworski

Nixon felt political pressure to allow Bork to appoint a new special prosecutor, and Bork, with Nixon's approval, chose Leon Jaworski. There was a question whether Jaworski would limit his investigation to the Watergate break-in or follow Cox's lead and look into other corrupt activities, such as those involving the "White House Plumbers". Continuing Cox's investigation, Jaworski did look at broader corruption involving the White House.

While Nixon continued to refuse to turn over the tapes, he agreed to release transcripts of a large number of them. Nixon said he did so partly because any audio pertinent to national security would have to be redacted from the tapes. There was further controversy on November 7 when an 18½-minute portion of one tape was found to have been erased. Nixon's personal secretary, Rose Mary Woods, said she had accidentally erased the tape by pushing the wrong foot pedal on her tape player while answering the phone. Later forensic analysis determined that the tape had been erased in several segments—at least five, and perhaps as many as nine.

Nixon's presidency succumbed to mounting pressure resulting from the Watergate scandal and its cover-up. Faced with almost certain impeachment and conviction, Nixon resigned.

In his posthumously published memoirs, Bork said Nixon promised him the next seat on the Supreme Court following Bork's role in firing Cox. Nixon was unable to carry out that promise, but President Ronald Reagan nominated Bork for the Supreme Court in 1987; his nomination nevertheless failed in the Senate.

The Ethics in Government Act of 1978 was a direct result of the Saturday Night Massacre.

After seven senior Justice Department officials resigned following the DOJ order to dismiss all federal charges against New York City mayor Eric Adams, some compared the resignations to the Saturday Night Massacre, calling the 2025 resignations the "Thursday Night Massacre".
