= Competition law theory =

Competition law theory is the field of economics and legal theory that aims to explain, criticise, and reform competition and antitrust law.

== Historical perspectives ==
Classical economists, such as Adam Smith and John Stuart Mill, were critical of monopolies and cartels. Smith, in The Wealth of Nations (1776), argued that laws "ought not to facilitate" the creation of economic cartels but nonetheless believed that there was no way the law could intervene in a way "consistent with liberty and justice". Mill, on the other hand, believed that the doctrine of restraint of trade was a justified form of government intervention as, although free trade allows for an ideal system for the distribution and pricing of resources, restraints on trade interfere with the ability of a market to engage in free trade and were a form of "evil".

Later neoclassical theory espoused the theoretical model of a perfectly competitive market, which would necessarily deliver allocative and productive efficiencies under ideal conditions. In other words, resource allocation under a perfectly competitive market would be Pareto efficient such that the long-run price is equal to the marginal cost of production, and economic surplus or 'welfare' is maximised. Production will also be Pareto efficient such that price equals the average costs of producing a good. Joseph Schumpeter has also argued that perfect competition will further result in a third form of efficiency known as dynamic efficiency, which refers to a situation where innovation is continuously sustained in a state of "creative destruction".

Mainstream neoclassical perspectives of monopoly hold that monopolistic firms are price-setters and will seek to maximise profits by reducing aggregate output and production below, and increasing prices above, levels at perfect competition. The total loss of consumer and producer surplus when compared to the perfect competition scenario is known as deadweight loss. Productive, dynamic, and X-inefficiencies may also arise due to the lower need for innovation and Pareto-optimal levels of production.

Some laissez-faire theories, skeptical of government intervention, hold that competition law is largely unnecessary because of the nature of economic competition in markets because of creative destruction. Under such theories, where a firm achieves market dominance, it is because of superior skill or innovation, but where it tries to raise prices to take advantage of its monopoly position, it will usually create profitable opportunities for others to compete, such that the monopoly will eventually be eroded via market processes.

Nonetheless, the majority of contemporary competition law scholars, and many neoclassical economists, believe that government intervention is necessary where monopolies have been formed in order to restore economic efficiencies.

=== Chicago school ===
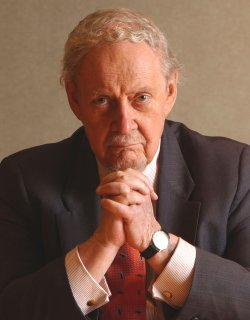
Robert Bork argued that antitrust law was flawed

The "Chicago school" of economics, comprised largely of neoclassical economists and some lawyers affiliated with the University of Chicago, were highly influential in the development of modern antitrust theory and doctrine. Leading Chicago antitrust economists include Aaron Director and Henry Calvert Simons; leading antitrust lawyers in the Chicago tradition include Richard Posner and Robert Bork.

Chicago school theorists believed in minimal state intervention, judicial restraint, and the operation of free markets. Contrary to the prior decisions of the United States courts, Chicago theorists argued that heavy-handed state intervention would often be anticompetitive, whereas many of the anticompetitive practices previously disallowed by the courts actually promote competition. The leading text on Chicago antitrust theory is Robert Bork's The Antitrust Paradox, which argued that the sole purpose of competition or antitrust law was to maximise total surplus, a doctrine which he termed the "consumer welfare standard". Bork further argued that only a few acts should be prohibited, namely cartels that fix prices and divide markets, mergers that create monopolies, and dominant firms pricing predatorily, while allowing such practices as vertical agreements and price discrimination on the grounds that it did not harm consumers.

The Chicago school was highly influential in the development of antitrust law in the United States courts, including at the United States Supreme Court. Subsequent academic and juridical consideration of the Chicago school has, however, been more critical of the movement.

=== New Brandeis movement ===
Modern movements away from the Chicago School include the New Brandeis movement.

== Economics ==
The majority of economists, including industrial-organisation economists, as well as competition lawyers and voters, believe that government intervention in the form of competition law is necessary and desirable. Laissez-faire theories that completely reject any state intervention in competition are considered heterodox.

Contemporary economic developments have challenged conventional industrial organisation models and the efficacy of conventional competition law tools. As a result, modern directions of competition law include new and increased focuses on information economics, digital economy, and platform economy, including considerations of enforcement speed, dynamic models of competition, competitive harms beyond the consumer, network effects, winner-take-all markets, market dominating firms, monopsony powers, transaction costs, non-monetary costs, value of information, and attention costs.

=== Workable competition ===
The majority of economists and competition lawyers regard perfect competition as either impossible or extremely rare in real-world conditions. Further, by the theory of the second best, which holds that if one optimality condition for perfect competition cannot be satisfied, the next-best competitive solution can be achieved by changing other variables away from the values that would otherwise have been optimal.As such, competition law generally seeks to promote workable or effective competition rather than perfect competition.

Although there is no generally agreed-upon definition of workable or effective competition, one definition, proposed by Jesse W Markham, proposes a criterion of there being "no clearly indicated change than can be effected through public policy measures that would result in greater social gains than social losses". Practices are therefore regarded as anti-competitive if they significantly or unfairly distort effective competition.

Empirical theories of effective competition characterise such markets by reference to multiple factors, such as low four-firm concentration ratios (typically below 40%), flexible pricing, low entry barriers, little collusion, and low rates of profit. In reference to theories of perfect competition, competition in real-world markets can also be measured by either the elasticity of demand or the relative excess of price over marginal costs; in a perfectly competitive market, price is perfectly elastic and equal to marginal cost.

=== Market concentration and dominance ===
Market concentration is closely related to and generally, although not always, positively correlated with market competition. Greater market concentration by a one or a few firms is generally regarded as undesirable because of the increased theoretical likelihood of collusion (and consequently supracompetitive profits) and the inherently higher profits larger firms enjoy because of their greater efficiency. Even where collusion is absent, game theoretic models predict higher prices and lower consumer surplus where market concentration is high, such as in cases of differentiated Bertrand competition and Cournot competition.

In most cases, high market concentration produces undesirable consequences such as reduced competition and higher prices. Nonetheless, some theoretical models, most notably the creative destruction model of Joseph Schumpeter, have argued that market concentration is positively correlated with innovation. Kenneth Arrow, on the other hand, has argued that a greater market concentration will decrease incentive to innovate because a firm within a monopoly or monopolistic market would have already reached profit levels that greatly exceed costs. Recent empirical research has found that there is a U-shaped relationship between market concentration and innovation.

==== Herfindahl–Hirschman index ====
The Herfindahl–Hirschman index (HHI) is the most commonly used measure of market concentration in competition law and economics and is defined as the sum of the squares of the market share held by each market participant:

$H=\sum_{i=1}^N s_i^2$

Where $s_i$ is the market share of firm i and N is the number of firms in the relevant market. In competition law, $s_i$ is typically expressed as a percentage, such that a market concentration level of less than 1000 is typically seen as low, whilst one of more than 1500 is regarded as excessive. $s_i$ is sometimes also expressed as a decimal, such that an HHI of 0 represents a perfectly competitive industry while an HHI of 1 represents a monopolised industry.

==== Concentration ratios ====
The concentration ratio (CR) is a measure of how concentrated a market is. It is calculated by summing of the market shares of the n largest enterprises:

$CR_n = C_1+C_2+.....+C_n$

where N is usually between 3 and 5. Generally speaking, a CR of less than 40% and a CR of more than 60% are regarded as modest and high levels of market concentration, respectively.

=== Anti-competitive practices ===
==== Barriers to entry ====
In competition law, a barrier to entry is defined as a fixed cost incurred by a new entrant into an existing market, which delays or obstructs entry into the market, and that reduces relative social welfare. So-called "antitrust barriers to entry" are different from the concept of barriers to entry in other areas of economics, such as strategic management, which may emphasise other factors, such as the relative advantage of incumbents. Examples of barriers to entry in competition law include: intellectual property rights (such as patents), economies of scale, existing regulations, network effects, and predatory pricing.

== Legal theory ==
Across many jurisdictions, a broad principle of competition law that has been applied is the "consumer welfare standard", regards the impact of business practices on consumer welfare as an important if not decisive factor in determining whether to find against the business. Despite its name, the consumer welfare standard, as originally expressed by conservative legal scholar Robert Bork, does not strictly aim to maximise consumer welfare but the welfare of both producers and consumers. The use of the consumer welfare standard as a decisive test for whether the law should intervene has been criticised for inappropriately restricting the scope of competition law to effects on prices to consumers instead of more broadly considering issues of fairness, efficiency, and justice. Today, most jurisdictions agree that the consumer welfare standard is not solely decisive in competition law cases but is one of a number of factors the courts should consider.

== Policy and political theory ==
Anti-cartel enforcement is a key focus of competition law enforcement policy. In the United States the Antitrust Criminal Penalty Enhancement and Reform Act 2004 raised the maximum imprisonment term for price fixing from three to ten years, and the maximum fine from $10 million to $100 million. In 2007 British Airways and Korean Air pleaded guilty to fixing cargo and passenger flight prices.

These actions complement the private enforcement which has always been an important feature of United States antitrust law. The United States Supreme Court summarised why Congress allows punitive damages in Hawaii v. Standard Oil.

"Every violation of the antitrust laws is a blow to the free-enterprise system envisaged by Congress. This system depends on strong competition for its health and vigor, and strong competition depends, in turn, on compliance with antitrust legislation. In enacting these laws, Congress had many means at its disposal to penalize violators. It could have, for example, required violators to compensate federal, state, and local governments for the estimated damage to their respective economies caused by the violations. But, this remedy was not selected. Instead, Congress chose to permit all persons to sue to recover three times their actual damages every time they were injured in their business or property by an antitrust violation."

In the EU, the Modernisation Regulation 1/2003 means that the European Commission is no longer the only body capable of public enforcement of European Community competition law. This was done in order to facilitate quicker resolution of competition-related inquiries. In 2005 the Commission issued a Green Paper on Damages actions for the breach of the EC antitrust rules, which suggested ways of making private damages claims against cartels easier.

Competition has been shown to be a significant predictor of productivity growth within nation states.

== See also ==
- Competition policy
- Consumer protection
- Herfindahl-Hirschman Index in market structure
- History of economic thought
- SSNIP
- Relevant market
- European Community competition law
- Irish Competition law
