= The Tempting of America =

1990 nonfiction book by Robert Bork

- Author: Robert Bork
- Language: English
- Genre: Non-fiction
- Publisher: The Free Press
- Publication date: 1990
- Publication place: United States
- Media type: Book
- ISBN: 9780029037614
- OCLC: 855916653

The Tempting of America is a 1990 non-fiction book by former United States Court of Appeals judge Robert Bork. Published three years after the U. S. Senate rejected Bork's nomination to the United States Supreme Court, the book offers a personal account of the nomination battle, argues for an originalist approach to constitutional interpretation, and warns against what Bork sees as the politicization of American law. The book spent sixteen weeks on The New York Times non-fiction bestseller list.

== See also ==
- United States Supreme Court
