= Economic ethics =

Application of ethical principles to economic phenomena

Economic ethics is the combination of economics (the social science studying goods and services) and ethics (the philosophical study of morality). This combination uses both disciplines to predict, analyze, and model economic phenomena.

Economic ethics can be summarized as the theoretical ethical prerequisites and foundations of economic systems. This approach can be traced back to the ancient Greek philosopher Aristotle, whose Nicomachean Ethics describes the connection between objective economic principles and justice. The academic literature on economic ethics is extensive, citing natural law and religious law as influences on the rules of economics. The consideration of moral philosophy or moral economy differs from the approach of behavioral economic models. The standard creation, application, and beneficiaries of economic models present a trilemma when ethics are taken into account. These ideas, in conjunction with the assumption of rationality in economics, establish a link between economics and ethics.

== History ==
=== Ancient times ===
==== India ====
Ancient Indian economic thought centered on the relationship between happiness, ethics, and economic values, because connections between these concepts led to a constituting description of human existence. The fundamental ideas of transcendental unity, oneness, and stability in the Upanishads (ancient Sanskrit religious and philosophical texts of Hinduism) are examples derived from this relationship. Ancient Indian philosophy shows an understanding of several modern economic concepts—for instance, the regulation of demand when it exceeds supply as a way to avoid anarchy. Such regulation was achieved by stressing that nonmaterial goods were the source of happiness. This approach also reflects economist Alfred Marshall's dictum about the insatiability of wants.

The Rig Veda (the first sacred canonical text of Hinduism) shows an awareness of economic inequality. In Book 10, the text states that "the riches of the liberal never waste away, while he who will not give finds no comfort in them." This statement indicates that generating personal wealth was not considered immoral, but rather that hoarding this wealth was a sin. The Arthashastra (an ancient Indian treatise) formulated laws promoting economic efficiency in the context of an ethical society. The author, Kautilya, posited that building infrastructure—which was the king's responsibility—was a key determinant of economic growth when constructed in an ethical environment.

==== Greece ====
Ancient Greek philosophers combined economic teachings with ethical systems. Socrates, Plato, and Aristotle believed that happiness was the most valuable good that humans could strive for. The belief that happiness could not be achieved without pleasure complicated the relationship between ethics and economics at the time. Callicles, for example, held that a person who lived ethically should gratify all of their desires through courage and practicality, which created an anomaly around the issues of scarcity and the regulation of consumption. This anomaly was reconciled through the division of labor, where basic human wants such as food, clothing, and shelter were efficiently manufactured, given that each person limited work to their most productive function, thereby maximizing utility (a measure of satisfaction).

Xenophon's work Economicus was inspired by Socrates' concept of eudaimonia (human flourishing); this work requires that, since virtue is knowledge, a person should understand how to use money and property well, rather than merely acquire them for personal gain.

=== Middle Ages ===
Religion was at the core of economic life during the European Middle Ages; therefore, the theologians of the period used inferences from their ethical teachings to answer economic questions and achieve economic objectives. This approach was also adopted by philosophers during the Age of Enlightenment (a European cultural movement). The Roman Catholic Church altered its doctrinal interpretation of the validity of marriage, in part to prevent competition from threatening its monopolistic market position. Usury—or loans with high interest—was seen as an ethical issue by the Church, with justice being valued above economic efficiency.

The transition from an agrarian lifestyle to monetary commerce in ancient Israel led to the adoption of interest in lending, because this practice was not directly prohibited in the Torah, under the principle that "your brother may live with you."

Economic development during the Middle Ages depended on the ethical practices of merchants, founded on the transformation in medieval society's understanding of the economics of property and ownership. Islam supported this anti-ascetic ethic for merchants, given the religion's teaching that salvation derives from moderation rather than from abstinence in such affairs.

=== Classical economics ===
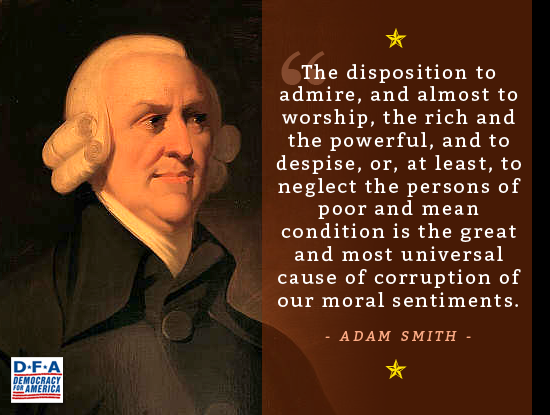
Adam Smith on corruption

The labor theory of value (a theory in classical and Marxian economics) holds that labor is the source of all economic value. The distinction between wage slaves and proper slaves in this theory—both types of persons being viewed as commodities—is founded on a moral principle: wage slaves voluntarily offer their privately owned labor power to a buyer for a bargained price, while proper slaves, according to Karl Marx, have no such rights.

Although advocated by classical economics, mercantilism (an economic policy emphasizing exports) is regarded as ethically ambiguous in academic literature. The economist and philosopher Adam Smith, creator of the labor theory of value, noted that national economic policy favored the interests of producers at the expense of consumers, because domestically produced goods were subject to high inflation. The competition between domestic households and foreign speculators also led to an unfavorable balance of trade, i.e., increasing current account deficits on the balance of payments.

Writers and commentators of the period used Aristotle's ethical counsel to resolve this economic dilemma.

=== Neoclassical economics ===
The moral philosophy of Adam Smith started the neoclassical worldview in economics; this view holds that one's quest for happiness is the ultimate purpose of life, and that the model of homo economicus (humans as rational, self-interested agents) describes the fundamental behavior of an economic agent. The assumption that individuals are self-interested and rational implies the exclusion of collective ethics. Assuming rational choice and following neoclassical economics' adoption of Newtonian atomism (a philosophy holding that the world comprises fundamental indivisible components), many consumer behaviors are disregarded. As a result, economics often cannot explain the source of consumer preferences when they are not determined by an individual. The role of collective ethics in consumer preference cannot be explained by neoclassical economics. This problem degrades the applicability of the market demand function (how much of something a consumer would buy at a certain price), a key analytical tool, to real economic phenomena. In principle, then, economists have avoided and still avoid the assumptions of abstract economic models and the unique aspects of economic problems.

=== Contemporary history ===
According to the economist John Maynard Keynes, the complete integration of ethics and economics depends on the rate of economic development. Economists have been able to aggregate the preferences of agents, under the assumption of homo economicus, by merging utilitarian ethics and institutionalism. Keynes departed from the atomistic view of neoclassical economics with his holistic perspective of the global economy, given that "the whole is not equal to the sum of its parts ... the assumptions of a uniform and homogeneous continuum are not satisfied." This perspective reinforced the idea that an unethical socioeconomic state is apparent when an economy has less than full employment; to solve this problem, Keynes proposed productive spending as a mechanism to return the economy to full employment, the state where an ethically rational society exists.

== Influences ==
=== Religion ===
Philosophers in the Hellenistic tradition became a driving force behind the Gnostic vision: the redemption of the human spirit through asceticism, a lifestyle of frugality and abstinence. This vision founded the debate about evil and ignorance in policy discussions. In the 2nd and 3rd centuries AD, the amalgamation of two philosophies—the ancient Greek concept of logos and early Christian philosophy—caused believers to deviate from moral principles. This problem led to the solution that people were to act in their own best interest, given appropriate reasoning, to prevent ignorance.

The Old Testament, the first division of the Christian Bible, served as the source of ethics in ancient economic practices. Currency debasement was prohibited because of its fraudulent nature and negative economic consequences, which were punished according to several Bible verses: Ezekiel 22:18–22, Isaiah 1:25, and Proverbs 25:4–5. Relationships between economic and religious literature have been founded on the New Testament. For example, the verse James 1:27 states that "looking after orphans and widows in their distress and keeping oneself unspotted by the world make for pure worship without stain before our God and Father"; this statement supports the academic argument that the goal of the economic process is to perfect one's personality.

The concept of human capital valuation is evident in the Talmud, the central text of Rabbinic Judaism. The idea of opportunity cost is grounded in the sekhar batala (lit. 'lost time') concept in Talmudic literature. In ancient Israel, a rabbi was not to be paid for his work, because such payment would imply that he profited from preaching and interpreting the word of God; instead, the rabbi would be compensated in other ways for survival purposes, given that he was not engaged in any other profession.

The Qur'an (the central religious text of Islam) and the Sunnah (literature on Muhammad's deeds and sayings) have guided Islamic economic practice for centuries. For example, the Qur'an bans ribā (roughly, "usury") as part of its focus on eradicating interest, in order to prevent financial institutions operating under the guidance of Islamic economics from making monopolistic returns. Zakat (a form of giving alms that is obligatory in Islam) is a system for the redistribution of wealth. The Qur'an specifies that such alms are intended only for certain people: the poor, the needy, zakat administrators, people whose hearts need reconciling, people in bondage, deeply indebted people, people striving for the cause of God, and wayfarers. Pension loan schemes (PLSs) and other microfinance schemes apply this teaching. Examples include the Hodeibah microfinance program in Yemen and the United Nations Development Programme's Murabahah initiatives at Mount al-Hass in Syria.

=== Culture ===
Economic ethics attempts to incorporate aspects of morality and cultural values to account for the limitation of economics, which is that human decision-making is not purely rational. This understanding of culture unifies economics and ethics as a complete theory of human action. Academic culture has shown increased interest in economic ethics as a discipline. This interest has led to an increased awareness of two phenomena: the cultural externalities (costs or benefits imposed on others) of the actions of economic agents; and the limited separation between cultural spheres, which has prompted further research into their ethical liability. For example, a limitation of considering only the instrumental value of an artwork lies in potentially disregarding the artwork's intrinsic value; thus, the artwork should not be solely quantified. Artwork can also be considered a public good because of its intrinsic value, given its potential to contribute to national identity and educate its audience about its subject matter. Intrinsic value can also be quantified because it has incremental value, regardless of whether an artwork is sacred by association and history.

== Application to economic methodologies ==
=== Experimental economics ===
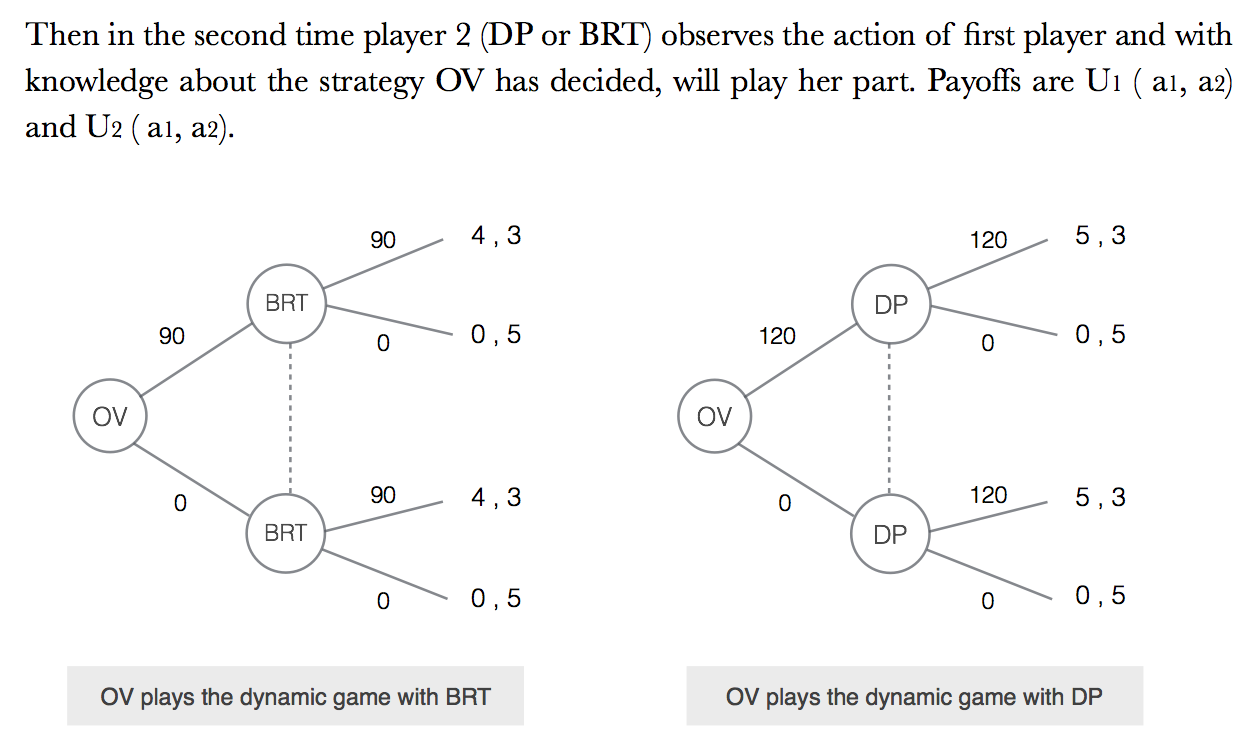
Example of game theory and associated payoffs

The development of experimental economics in the late 20th century created an opportunity to empirically verify the existence of normative ethics in economics. The economist Vernon L. Smith and his colleagues found numerous cases that may illustrate economic choices made under the veil of ignorance (a thought experiment in which people choose rules without knowing their own place in society). Conclusions from certain economic experiments indicate that economic agents use normative ethics in making decisions, while also seeking to maximize their own payoffs. For example, in experiments on honesty, it was predicted that lying would occur when it increased an agent's payoffs; however, the experimental outcomes proved otherwise. In addition, it was found that people use a "50/50 rule" to divide something, regardless of the power distribution during the decision-making process.

Experimental economic studies of altruism (concern for the well-being of others) have identified it as a rational behavior. The absence of an explanation for such behavior indicates a conflict in experimental economics, in that the field interprets morality as both an endogenous and an exogenous factor, according to the case at hand. Research into the viability of normative theory to explain moral reasoning is needed; an experimental design can focus on whether economic agents, under the conditions assumed by the theory, produce the same decisions as those predicted by the theory. This approach assumes that agents, under the veil of ignorance, are "non-tuist" (indifferent to the welfare of others) in the real world, as theory suggests.

=== Behavioral economics ===
Ethical considerations are widespread in behavioral economics, given the field's concern with human agency and its aim to rectify the ethical deficits found in neoclassical economics; these deficits include a lack of moral dimension and normative concerns. The incorporation of virtue ethics (an ethical approach focused on character) into behavioral economics has facilitated theories that attempt to describe the anomalies in how economic agents make decisions. Normative concerns in economics can compensate for how behavioral economic models apply to real economic phenomena. Most behavioral economic models assume that preferences change endogenously, implying that multiple potential decisions apply in a given situation, each with an ethical value. Hence, the field is cautious about considering welfare as the highest ethical value in economics, as conjectured in academic literature. As a result, the field's methodology also employs order ethics (an approach focusing on the institutional and order framework of a society and its economy) in assuming that progress in morality and economic institutions is simultaneous, given that behavior can only be understood in an institutional framework.

Complications arise when applying normative inferences to empirical research in behavioral economics, because descriptive and prescriptive inferences (and propositions) differ fundamentally. For example, the argument against the use of incentives—that they force certain behaviors in people and convince them to ignore risk—is a descriptive proposition that is empirically unjustified.

== Application to economic subdisciplines ==
=== Environmental economics ===
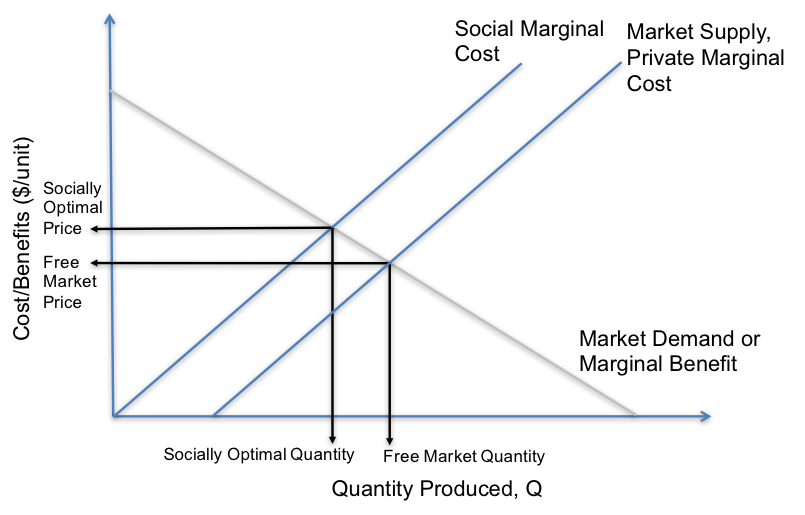
Model of supply and demand in environmental economics

Welfare is maximized in environmental economic models when economic agents act according to the homo economicus hypothesis. This observation creates the possibility of economic agents compromising sustainable development for their private interests, given that homo economicus is restricted to individual rationality. Climate-change policy resulting from environmental economics is subject to ethical considerations. The economics of climate change, for example, is inseparable from social ethics. The potential for individuals and institutions to collaborate in the public domain, reflecting homo politicus, is an appropriate ethic that can correct the normative concern. There is an ethical problem associated with the subdiscipline of discounting: consumers value the present more than the future, with implications for intergenerational justice. Discounting in marginal cost-benefit analysis (CBA; a systematic approach to estimating the strengths and weaknesses of alternatives), which economists view as a predictor of human behavior, is limited with respect to future risk and uncertainty. The use of monetary measures in environmental economics is based on instrumentalizing natural things, which is inaccurate if these things are intrinsically valuable. Other relationships and roles between generations can be clarified by adopting certain ethical rules. The Brundtland Commission, for example, defines sustainable development as development that meets present needs without compromising the ability of future generations to do so (which is a libertarian principle). According to the philosophy of libertarianism, no redistribution of welfare is made unless all generations benefit or are unaffected.

=== Political economy ===
Political economy (the study of the development of social production) is fundamentally normative, focusing on the needs of the economy as a whole by analyzing the role of agents, institutions, and markets, as well as socially optimal behavior. Historically, morality was used to understand the distribution of these roles and responsibilities, given that most economic problems derived from the failure of economic agents to fulfill these obligations. The transition of moral philosophy from these ethics to Kantian ethics—as well as the emergence of market forces and competition law—subjected the moral-political values of the moral economy to rational judgment. Economic ethics remains a substantial influence on political economy because of the field's argumentative nature, as demonstrated in the literature on government responses to the 2008 financial crisis. One related proposition holds that, since the contagion of the crisis was transmitted through distinct national financial systems, future global regulatory responses should be built on the distributive justice principle. The regulation of particular cases of financial innovation, in overlooking critiques of the global financial system, functionally normalizes societal perceptions of the system's distribution of power, so that such regulation reduces the opportunities for agents to question the morality of such practices.

=== Development economics ===
The relationship between ethics and economics has defined the aim of development economics (the economics of developing economies). The notion that a person's quality of life is determined by their ability to lead a valuable life has supported development economics as a mechanism for expanding such capability. This proposition is the basis of the conceptual relationship between development economics and welfare economics (the subfield of economics that evaluates well-being) as an ethical discipline, as well as the basis for debate in academic literature. The related discourse is based on the notion that certain tools in welfare economics—particularly choice criteria—hold no value judgment and are Paretian (with a weakly optimal allocation of resources), given that collective perspectives on utility are not considered. Numerous ethical issues are associated with the methodological approach of development economics, i.e., randomized field experiments, many of which are morally ambiguous. For example, randomization benefits some cases and hinders others, which is rational under statistical assumptions and is simultaneously a deontological moral issue. In addition, ethical implications relate to the calculus, the nature of consent, the instrumentalization, the accountability, and the role of foreign intervention in this experimental approach.

=== Health economics ===
In health economics, the ultimate end of maximizing the level of human well-being is ethically unjustified, in contrast to an efficient allocation of resources in health that augments the average utility level. Under this utility-maximizing approach (subject to libertarianism), a dichotomy is apparent between health and freedom as primary goods, because one is necessary to attain the other. Any level of access, usage, and funding of healthcare is ethically justified, as long as this level achieves the desired and needed health outcomes. Health economists operationalize the concept of a need: one that accomplishes an ethically legitimate goal for a person. This approach is based on the notion that healthcare has no intrinsic value, but is morally significant because it contributes to overall well-being. The analytical methodology of health economics, as used in clinical trials, is open to ethical debate. An experimental design should be partly the responsibility of health economists, given their tendency to add variables having the potential to be statistically insignificant. Such a design increases the risk of underpowering a study, which in health economics is primarily concerned with cost-effectiveness and carries implications for evaluation.

== Application to economic policy ==
Iterative and adaptive decision strategy

Academic literature presents numerous ethical views on what constitutes a viable economic policy. Keynes believed that good economic policies make people behave well, as opposed to policies that make people feel well. The Verein für Socialpolitik (a German-speaking society of economists), founded by Gustav von Schmoller, maintains that ethical and political considerations are critical for evaluating economic policies. Rational actor theory in the policy arena is evident in the use of Pareto optimality to assess the economic efficiency of policies, as well as in the use of CBA, where income is the basic unit of measurement. The use of an iterative decision-making model, as an example of rationality, can provide a framework for economic policy responding to climate change.

Academic literature also presents ethical reasoning for the limitations associated with applying rational actor theory to policy choices. Given that incomes depend on policy choice and vice versa, the logic of the rational model in policy choice is circular—hence the possibility of incorrect policy recommendations. In addition, many factors increase a person's propensity to deviate from modeled assumptions of decision-making. Under the self-effacing moral theory, it is argued that such mechanisms as CBA may be justified even if not explicitly moral. The contrasting belief that public actions are based on such utilitarian reckonings, and that all policy-making is politically contingent, justifies the need for forecasting, which itself poses an ethical dilemma. This dilemma arises because forecasts can be altered to suit a particular action or policy, rather than being objective and neutral. For example, the code of ethics of the American Institute of Certified Planners provides insufficient support for forecasters to avert this alteration. As another example, the Code of Professional Ethics and Practices of the American Association for Public Opinion Research is limited in regulating or preventing this practice.

== See also ==
- Economic ideology
- Socioeconomics
- Normative economics
- Political economy
- Ethical consumerism
- The Economic Ethics of the World Religions
- Philosophy and economics
