= Slouching Towards Gomorrah =

1996 work of cultural criticism by Robert Bork

- Author: Robert H. Bork
- Language: English
- Genre: Liberalism in the United States
- Published: 1997
- Publisher: ReganBooks
- Publication place: United States
- Media type: Print (hardback & paperback), audiobook, e-book
- Pages: 382 (hardcover)
- ISBN: 978-0060987190
- OCLC: 37126415
- Dewey Decimal: 306.0973

Slouching Towards Gomorrah: Modern Liberalism and American Decline is a 1996 non-fiction book by Robert H. Bork, a former United States Court of Appeals judge. Bork's thesis in the book is that U.S. and more generally Western culture is in a state of decline and that the cause of this decline is modern liberalism and the rise of the New Left. Specifically, he attacks modern liberalism for what he describes as its dual emphases on radical egalitarianism and radical individualism. The title of the book is a play on the last couplet of W. B. Yeats's poem "The Second Coming": "And what rough beast, its hour come round at last, / Slouches towards Bethlehem to be born?" Bork contends that the "rough beast of decadence … now sends us slouching towards our new home, not Bethlehem but Gomorrah." More directly, the title borrows from Joan Didion's Slouching Towards Bethlehem.

== Overview ==
Bork first traces the rapid expansion of modern liberalism and leftism that occurred during the 1960s, arguing that this legacy of radicalism demonstrates that the precepts of modern liberalism and leftism are antithetical to the rest of the U.S. political tradition. He then attacks a variety of social, cultural, and political experiences as evidence of U.S. cultural decline and degeneracy. Among these are affirmative action, increased violence in and sexualization of mass media, the legalization of abortion, pressure to legalize assisted suicide and euthanasia, feminism and the decline of religion. Bork, himself a rejected nominee of President Ronald Reagan to the United States Supreme Court, also criticizes that institution and argues that the judiciary and liberal judicial activism are catalysts for U.S. cultural corruption.

In Slouching Towards Gomorrah Bork advocates for an amendment to the United States Constitution which would allow Congress to override any federal court decision by simple majority vote.

== Reception ==
The book received a negatively critical response by libertarian The Mises Review, which stated that "Bork's failure to set forward his arguments rigorously leads to a crucial error in his approach to constitutional interpretation" and that the "omni-competent state is, for Bork, not a monster to be dispatched but a tool to be used. Whether the state is likely to enforce the values he favors is a question he leaves un-examined".
