= Consumer welfare standard =

Legal doctrine in antitrust law

In the context of U.S. competition law, the consumer welfare standard (CWS) or consumer welfare principle (CWP) is a legal doctrine used to determine the applicability of antitrust enforcement.

Under the consumer welfare standard, a corporate merger is deemed anti-competitive “only when it harms both allocative efficiency and raises the prices of goods above competitive levels or diminishes their quality". This contrasts with earlier frameworks of antitrust theory, and more recently the New Brandeis movement, which argue that corporate mergers are inherently detrimental to consumers because of the diminishing competition resulting from it.

In other words, the consumer welfare standard does not analyze antitrust issues from a "big is bad" perspective that condemns corporate consolidation as a negative phenomenon in of itself. Instead, the framework stipulates that corporate consolidation is not necessarily harmful to consumers, as long as a merger (or series of mergers) does not lead to individuals having to pay more for a product or service.

== Background and origins ==
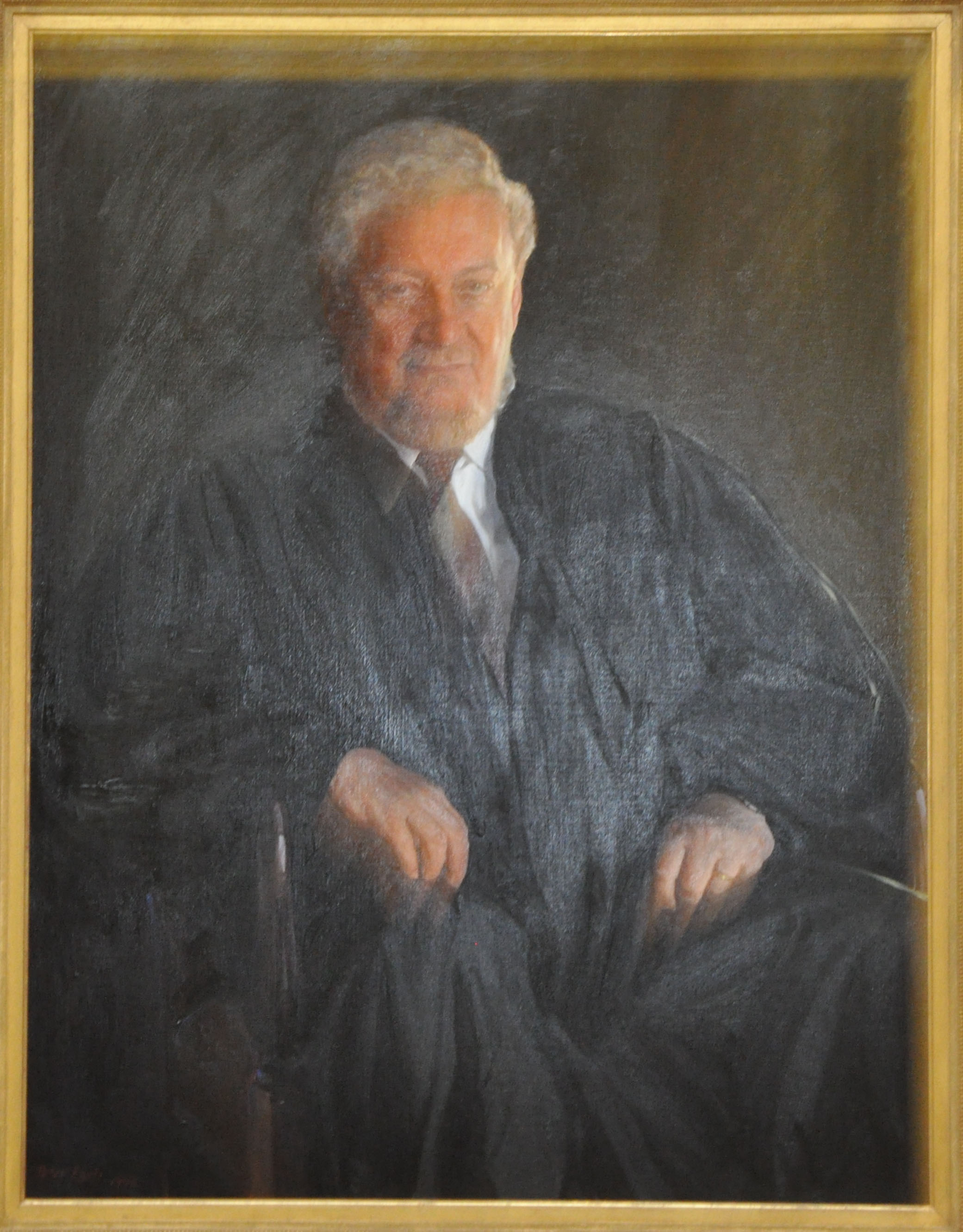
The work of legal scholar Robert Bork is often cited as having contributed to the development of the consumer welfare standard.

The roots of the consumer welfare standard can be found in the work of conservative legal scholar Robert Bork, most notably in his 1978 book The Antitrust Paradox. The consumer welfare standard gradually replaced the rule of reason principle as the dominant legal theory behind antitrust enforcement by the 1980s.

The consumer welfare standard was influenced by microeconomic theory and is related to the economic theories of the Chicago school of economics. The adoption of the consumer welfare standard by courts and regulatory agencies has been credited with the sharp drop in antitrust enforcement in recent decades.

== Criticism ==
In the 21st century, antitrust advocates affiliated with the progressive "New Brandeis movement" have called into question the value of the consumer welfare standard. These critics argue that, by emerging as the dominant form of antitrust analysis by courts and regulators, the consumer welfare standard has led to less competition and an increase in the average market share of firms in a given sector.

Many of these critics favor an approach to antitrust enforcement tools to promote of economic equality and labor rights. During the Biden administration, multiple noted critics of the consumer welfare standard were appointed to federal office. These include Jonathan Kanter, Assistant Attorney General for the Department of Justice Antitrust Division, and Lina Khan, Chair of the Federal Trade Commission (FTC).

Some conservatives, such as Jeff Landry of Louisiana, have also argued that the consumer welfare standard is insufficient, stating that he believes that "defining any corporate behavior that leads to lower prices for consumers as acceptable is not true to the original intent of antitrust legislation."

In the 2022 book Chokepoint Capitalism, Rebecca Giblin and Cory Doctorow argue that the consumer welfare standard has enabled antitrust law to be weaponized against businesses with less market power, including gig workers and content creators, while leaving the power of more dominant entities intact. Since gig workers are generally classified as independent contractors, they are prohibited from engaging in collective bargaining with the platforms that "employ" them, as this constitutes price fixing and diminishes consumer welfare. In January 2025, the FTC issued a policy statement shielding gig workers from antitrust liability when they engage in protected bargaining and organizing activities such as seeking better compensation and job conditions.
