= Bork tapes =

Series of videotapes rented out by Robert Bork

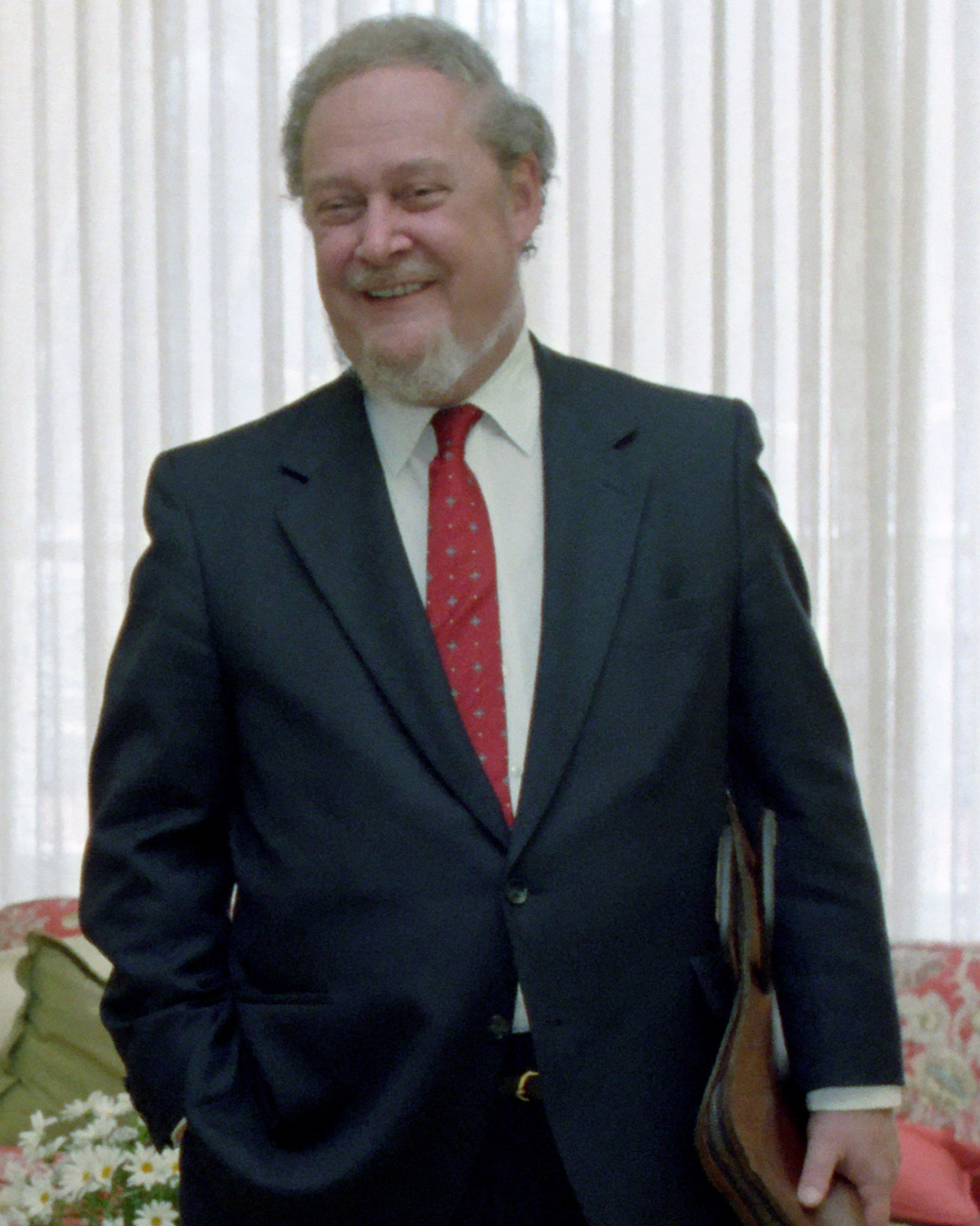
Robert Bork at the White House on October 9, 1987, shortly after the Washington City Paper published "The Bork Tapes"

The Bork tapes were a series of 146 videotapes rented out by Robert Bork, then a judge of the United States Court of Appeals for the District of Columbia Circuit, from Potomac Video in Washington, D.C. He had been nominated to the Supreme Court of the United States by President Ronald Reagan on July 1, 1987. His contentious confirmation hearings made him a subject of intense media scrutiny, based especially on his views concerning privacy in the Constitution. Michael Dolan, a writer at the Washington City Paper who frequented the same video rental store, learned about Bork's visits and obtained his rental history from store management.

On September 25, the City Paper published Dolan's commentary on Bork's rentals but not the list itself in a cover story titled "The Bork Tapes". The revealed tapes proved to be modest, innocuous, and non-salacious, consisting of a garden-variety of films such as thrillers, British drama, and those by Alfred Hitchcock. The subsequent leakage and coverage of the tapes resulted in Congress passing the Video Privacy Protection Act (VPPA), which forbids the sharing of video tape rental information, amidst a bipartisan consensus on intellectual privacy. Proponents of the VPPA, including Senator Patrick Leahy, contended that the leakage of Bork's tapes was an outrage. The bill was passed in just over a year after the incident.

== Background ==
President Ronald Reagan nominated Judge Robert Bork to the Supreme Court of the United States on July 1, 1987, to replace Justice Lewis F. Powell Jr. Bork was a judge of the United States Court of Appeals for the District of Columbia Circuit, and was known for his strict constructionist views regarding the subject of privacy, for which he believed privacy protections were guaranteed only by specific legislation. Due to his role in the Watergate scandal, he was also a controversial candidate, having come under criticism by Senate Democrats.

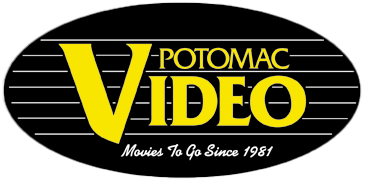
Logo of Potomac Video

During Bork's September 1987 confirmation hearings, writer Michael Dolan of the City Paper learned that he and Bork frequented the same video store: Potomac Video on MacArthur Boulevard in Washington, D.C. Bork's beliefs concerning privacy prompted Dolan to investigate his rental records in an attempt to expose him. After asking the assistant manager of the store for Bork's rental history, Dolan received a Xerox copy of handwritten entries for Bork's 146 prior video rentals which had been rented in a span of less than two years. He reasoned that "the only way to figure out what someone is like is to examine what that someone likes" and wondered if "Robert Bork only rented homosexual porn...or slasher flicks...or (the... horror...) Disney."

After Dolan convinced his editor of its legality, the City Paper published his article under the headline "The Bork Tapes". It ran in the September 25 edition. United Press International picked up the story that weekend. "By Monday morning," Dolan said, "I was fielding phone calls from reporters writing stories about the stories being written about the story that I wrote."

== Content ==
Although other press outlets claimed "The Bork Tapes" had reproduced the list of Bork's rentals from the records obtained by Dolan, the article does not actually include such a list. The article argues that Bork's rentals revealed aspects of his preferences and sensibilities, carrying the subtitle: "Never mind his writings on Roe vs. Wade. The inner workings of Robert Bork's mind are revealed by the videos he rents." According to Dolan's assessment of the list of tapes, Bork eschewed sex and violence, was an anglophile, primarily watched movies starring men, and was more qualified to be a "Supreme Couch Potato" than a justice of the Supreme Court. Dolan concluded the article by threatening to investigate the viewing habits of other politicians.

According to Dolan's report, Bork's favorite actor appeared to be Cary Grant, who appeared in 12 of the 146 videotapes, along with Roger Moore and Alec Guinness. His favorite director seemed to be Alfred Hitchcock, who directed 12 films. The frequency of the rentals suggested that he enjoyed mysteries, action, adventure, and British films. He checked out The Man Who Knew Too Much, The Man With the Golden Gun, and Comfort and Joy three times each, in addition to classics such as Citizen Kane and The Philadelphia Story. Two films were about judges—First Monday in October and The Star Chamber—and other titles included The Who's concert film The Kids Are Alright and teen comedies Pretty in Pink and Sixteen Candles. None of the films Bork checked out had an X rating or R rating under the MPAA rating system.

== Impact ==
After the publication of "The Bork Tapes", members of Congress voiced concerns about the ease with which public figures' video history could be revealed. The Video Privacy Protection Act, often called "the Bork Bill", was quickly passed. It applied some of the United States' highest privacy protections to video rental records and imposed heavy civil liability on violators. Reflecting on his story's impact a year later, Dolan wrote: "In a single scoop I created a nonrecurring problem—and a cottage legislative industry designed to solve it. What really hurts is that they're calling the statutory offspring of my little prank the 'Bork Bills,' when they ought to be the Dolan Amendments."

== Bibliography ==
- Cohn, Jonathan (2019). The Burden of Choice: Recommendations, Subversion, and Algorithmic Culture. Rutgers University Press. ISBN 978-0-8135-9783-6.
- Dolan, Michael (September 25 – October 1, 1987). "The Bork Tapes". City Paper. Vol. 7, no. 9. Washington, D.C.: Washington Free Weekly, Inc. pp. 1, 12, 14, 16, 18. ISSN 2574-3937.
- Dolan, Michael (February 21, 1988). "'America Was Ready for a Chuckle'". The Washington Post. p. B08. ProQuest 307000738.
- McCabe, Kathryn Elizabeth (April 2013). "Just You and Me and Netflix Makes Three: Implications for Allowing "Frictionless Sharing" of Personally Identifiable Information Under the Video Privacy Protection Act" (PDF). Journal of Intellectual Property Law. 20 (2): 413–443.
- Preer, Jean (2008). Library Ethics. Westport, Connecticut: Libraries Unlimited. ISBN 978-1-59158-636-4 – via Google Books.
- Richards, Neil (June 1, 2017). Intellectual Privacy: Rethinking Civil Liberties in the Digital Age. Oxford University Press. ISBN 978-0-19-994615-0.
- "The Video Privacy Protection Act as a Model Intellectual Privacy Statute". Harvard Law Review. 131 (6): 1766–1789. April 2018.

== See also ==
- A. J. Weberman – writer known for digging through Bob Dylan's garbage in the early 1970s, a practice he called "garbology"
