= Video Privacy Protection Act =

1988 American law on tape rental privacy

Video Privacy Protection Act of 1988
- Long title: An act to amend title 18, United States Code, to preserve personal privacy with respect to the rental, purchase, or delivery of video tapes or similar audio visual materials.
- Acronyms (colloquial): VPPA
- Enacted by: the 100th United States Congress
- Effective: November 5, 1988

Citations
- Public law: Pub. L. 100–618
- Statutes at Large: 102 Stat. 3195

Codification
- Titles amended: Title 18 of the United States Code
- U.S.C. sections created: 18 U.S.C. § 2710

Legislative history
- Introduced in the Senate as S. 2361 by Patrick Leahy (D-VT) on May 10, 1988; Committee consideration by United States Senate Committee on the Judiciary; Passed the Senate on October 14, 1988 (voice vote); Passed the House on October 19, 1988 (voice vote); Signed into law by President Ronald Reagan on November 5, 1988

Major amendments
- Pub. L. 112–258 (text) (PDF)

United States Supreme Court cases
- Salazar v. Paramount Global, No. 25-459, ___ U.S. ___ (2027)

The Video Privacy Protection Act (VPPA) is a bill that was passed by the United States Congress in 1988 as Pub. L. 100–618 and signed into law by President Ronald Reagan. It was created to prevent what it refers to as "wrongful disclosure of video tape rental or sale records" or similar audio visual materials such as video games. Congress passed the VPPA after Robert Bork's video rental history was published during his Supreme Court nomination and it became known as the "Bork bill". It makes any "video tape service provider" that discloses rental information outside the ordinary course of business liable for up to $2,500 in actual damages unless the consumer has consented, the consumer had the opportunity to consent, or the data was subject to a court order or warrant.

In 2013, the law was amended to add provisions allowing consumers to electronically consent to sharing video rental histories and to extend the time that consent can last to up to two years. The law became a focus of attention in the legal industry once again in the twenty-first century with the rise of audiovisual content sharing through digital media. Its revival is part of a trend in the filing of consumer privacy class actions, both through new laws like the California Consumer Privacy Act and older laws like the VPPA and wiretapping statutes.

== Computer-based VPPA litigation ==
Toward the end of the 2010s and beginning of the 2020s, the 1988 law experienced a resurgence in consumer class action lawsuits. The numerous lawsuits filed as part of this trend alleged that companies violated the VPPA by collecting and disclosing consumers' video viewing history through their websites, mobile apps, and other smart devices.

While the language of the VPPA focuses on "video tape service providers," consumers have argued that the law also protects the privacy of their personal information that is collected while they watch audiovisual content online. Cookies and other website behavior tracking technologies commonly found on popular websites allow the website operators to connect visitors' browsers with third parties who collect information from their website visit. This information can be shared with the third parties for various purposes including website functionality, language preferences and other personalization, and third party advertising. The recent resurgence of VPPA lawsuits is premised on the idea that data collected through the various tracking technologies may include personal information protected by the VPPA. Consumer plaintiffs assert that if that information is shared with third parties for analytics, advertising, or any other purpose that falls outside the exceptions in the VPPA, it is unlawful.

Prior to 2007, VPPA had not been cited by privacy attorneys as a cause of action involving electronic computing devices. Early lawsuits raising the VPPA in the context of data shared through the internet included a 2008 lawsuit against Facebook and thirty-three companies, including Blockbuster, Zappos, and Overstock.com, as well as the Lane v. Facebook, Inc. class action lawsuit, involving alleged privacy violations caused by the Facebook Beacon program.

The online advertising industry, in association with analytic companies, increasingly used video-based ads and at the same time gathered data from webpages and smart TV's showing digital video. By tracking web traffic online, consumers and their attorneys gather evidence of the data being collected by third parties through cookies and other tracking technologies when a person visits a website. Consumers use that traffic analysis to determine whether their protected personal information has been shared with third parties when they visited a particular website. For example, attorneys use software applications to log HTTP/HTTPS traffic between a computer's web browser and the Internet to produce evidence of tracking activities. This approach led to a $9.5 million settlement in the Lane v. Facebook, Inc. case.

VPPA rulings rarely survive appeal, so the Pharmatrak case (2003) remains the most significant precedent.

On January 26, 2026, the Supreme Court of the United States granted certiorari in the case of Salazar v. Paramount Global to resolve a circuit split regarding the definition of "consumer" under the VPPA. The central legal question is whether the statutory definition of a consumer—someone who is a "renter, purchaser, or subscriber of goods or services from a video tape service provider"—applies to individuals who subscribe to any goods or services (such as a digital newsletter) or is limited only to those who subscribe to audiovisual goods or services.

== 2013 Amendments ==
Following VPPA litigation against Netflix and other digital media industry giants, in January 2013, President Barack Obama signed Public Law 112-258, the Video Privacy Protection Act Amendments Act of 2012, allowing video rental companies to share rental information on social networking sites after obtaining customer permission.

Netflix, which had expressed concerns about violating the VPPA with its increasingly social video viewing services, reportedly lobbied for the change. Netflix cited the VPPA in 2011 following the announcement of its global integration with Facebook. The company noted that the VPPA was the sole reason why the new feature was not immediately available in the United States, and encouraged its customers to contact their representatives in support of legislation that would clarify the language of the law. In 2012, Netflix changed its privacy rules so that it no longer retained records for people who have left the site, a change that was reported to have been inspired by VPPA litigation.

Further results of VPPA litigation after the passage of these amendments were initially mixed. In 2015, the United States Court of Appeals for the Eleventh Circuit found that the law's protections do not reach the users of a free Android app, even when the app assigns each user a unique identification number and shares user behavior with a third party data analytics company.
