= Robert Bork =

American legal scholar (1927–2012)

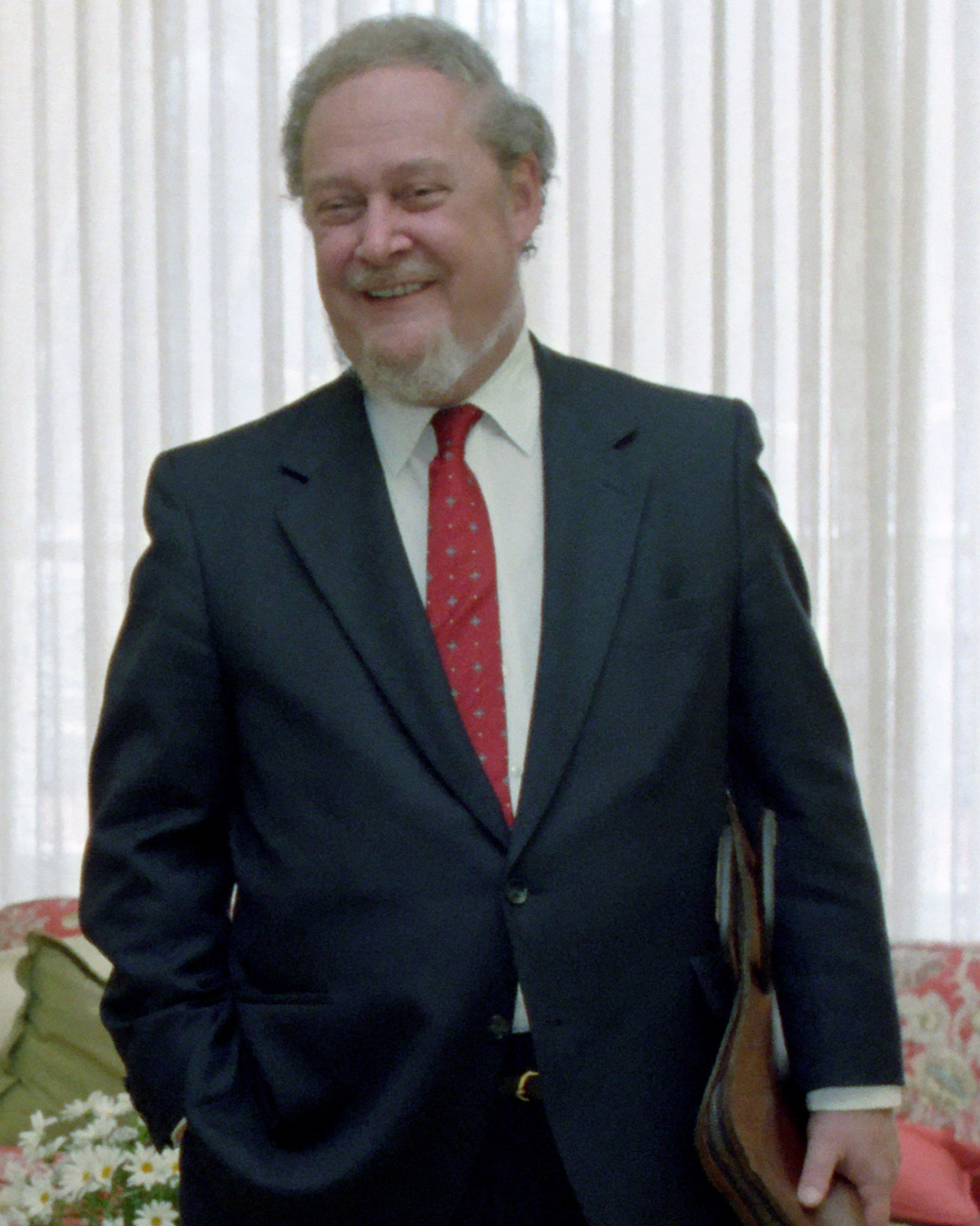
- Bork in 1987

Judge of the United States Court of Appeals for the District of Columbia Circuit
- In office February 9, 1982 – February 5, 1988
- Appointed by: Ronald Reagan
- Preceded by: Carl E. McGowan
- Succeeded by: Clarence Thomas

United States Attorney General
- Acting; October 20, 1973 – January 4, 1974
- President: Richard Nixon
- Deputy: Vacant
- Preceded by: William Ruckelshaus (acting)
- Succeeded by: William B. Saxbe

35th Solicitor General of the United States
- In office March 21, 1973 – January 20, 1977
- President: Richard Nixon; Gerald Ford
- Preceded by: Erwin Griswold
- Succeeded by: Wade H. McCree

Personal details
- Born: Robert Heron Bork; March 1, 1927 Pittsburgh, Pennsylvania, U.S.
- Died: December 19, 2012 (aged 85) Arlington County, Virginia, U.S.
- Resting place: Fairfax Memorial Park
- Party: Republican
- Spouses: Claire Davidson (m. 1952; died 1980); Mary Ellen Pohl (m. 1982)
- Children: 3
- Education: University of Chicago (BA, JD)

Military service
- Allegiance: United States
- Branch/service: United States Marine Corps
- Rank: Second lieutenant
- Battles/wars: Korean War

Robert Heron Bork (March 1, 1927 – December 19, 2012) was an American legal scholar who served as solicitor general of the United States from 1973 until 1977. A law professor, he was acting United States Attorney General from 1973 to 1974 and a judge on the U.S. Court of Appeals for the D.C. Circuit from 1982 to 1988. In 1987, President Ronald Reagan nominated Bork to the U.S. Supreme Court, but the Senate rejected his nomination after a contentious and highly publicized confirmation hearing.

Bork was born in Pittsburgh, Pennsylvania, and received both his undergraduate and legal education at the University of Chicago. After working at the law firms of Kirkland & Ellis and Willkie Farr & Gallagher, he served as a professor at Yale Law School. He became a prominent advocate of originalism, calling for judges to adhere to the original understanding of the United States Constitution, and an influential antitrust scholar, arguing that consumers often benefited from corporate mergers and that antitrust law should focus on consumer welfare rather than on ensuring competition. Bork wrote several books, including a scholarly work titled The Antitrust Paradox and a work of cultural criticism titled Slouching Towards Gomorrah.

From 1973 to 1977, he served as Solicitor General under Presidents Richard Nixon and Gerald Ford, successfully arguing several cases before the Supreme Court. During the October 1973 Saturday Night Massacre, Bork became acting U.S. Attorney General after his superiors in the U.S. Justice Department chose to resign rather than fire Special Prosecutor Archibald Cox, who was investigating the Watergate scandal. Following an order from President Nixon, Bork fired Cox as his first assignment as Acting Attorney General. Bork served as Acting Attorney General until January 4, 1974, and was succeeded by Ohio U.S. Senator William B. Saxbe.

In 1982, President Reagan appointed Bork to the Court of Appeals for the District of Columbia Circuit. In 1987, Reagan nominated Bork to replace retiring Supreme Court Justice Lewis Powell. His nomination attracted unprecedented media attention and efforts by interest groups to mobilize opposition to his confirmation, primarily due to his outspoken criticism of the Warren and Burger Courts and his role in the Saturday Night Massacre. His nomination was ultimately rejected in the Senate, 42–58, and the vacancy was filled by Anthony Kennedy. Bork resigned from his judgeship in 1988, taking up a career as an author. He served as a professor at various institutions, including the George Mason University School of Law. He advised presidential candidate Mitt Romney, and was a fellow at the American Enterprise Institute and at the Hudson Institute.

== Early life and education ==
Bork was born on March 1, 1927, in Pittsburgh, Pennsylvania. He was the only child of Harry Philip Bork Jr. (1897–1974), a steel company purchasing agent, and Elizabeth (née Kunkle; 1898–2004), a schoolteacher. His father was of German and Irish ancestry, while his mother was of Pennsylvania German descent.

Bork attended the Hotchkiss School in Lakeville, Connecticut. He later recalled that he spent his time there "reading books and arguing with people". He then attended the University of Chicago, where he was a member of the international social fraternity Phi Gamma Delta and graduated with a Bachelor of Arts in 1948. He then attended the University of Chicago Law School, where he was an editor of the University of Chicago Law Review. He graduated in 1953 with a J.D. degree and membership in the Order of the Coif and Phi Beta Kappa. Bork took a two-year leave of absence from law school to serve in the U.S. Marine Corps during the Korean War.

== Career ==
=== Academia ===
After law school, Bork spent another year in military service. From 1954 to 1962, he was in private practice at the law firms Kirkland & Ellis and Willkie Farr & Gallagher. In 1962, Bork left private practice and joined the faculty of Yale Law School as a professor. He taught at Yale from 1962 to 1981, with a four-year break from 1973 to 1977 when he served as U.S. Solicitor General. Among Bork's students at Yale Law were Bill Clinton, Hillary Clinton, Anita Hill, Robert Reich, Jerry Brown, Linda Greenhouse, John Bolton, Samuel Issacharoff, and Cynthia Estlund.

==== Antitrust law ====
As a law professor, Bork was best known for his 1978 book The Antitrust Paradox, in which he argued that consumers often benefited from corporate mergers, and that many contemporary readings of the antitrust laws were economically irrational and hurt consumers. He posited that the primary focus of antitrust laws should be on consumer welfare, including producer welfare and consumer welfare, rather than ensuring competition, for fostering competition of companies within an industry has a natural built-in tendency to allow, and even help, many poorly run companies with methodologies and practices that are both inefficient and expensive to continue in business simply for the sake of competition, to the detriment of both consumers and society. Bork's writings on antitrust law, with those of Richard Posner and other law and economics and Chicago School thinkers, have been influential in causing a shift in the Supreme Court's approach to antitrust laws since the 1970s. Bork also supports using anticompetitive practices within the text as useful business practices.

=== Solicitor General ===
Bork served as Solicitor General in the U.S. Department of Justice from March 1973 until 1977. As Solicitor General, he argued several high-profile cases before the Supreme Court in the 1970s, including 1974's Milliken v. Bradley, where his brief in support of the State of Michigan was influential among the justices. Chief Justice Warren Burger called Bork the most effective counsel to appear before the court during his tenure. Bork hired many young attorneys as assistants who went on to have successful careers, including judges Danny Boggs and Frank H. Easterbrook as well as Robert Reich, later Secretary of Labor in the Clinton administration.

==== Saturday Night Massacre ====
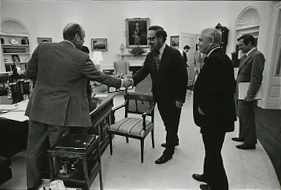
Bork greeting President Gerald Ford in the Oval Office in June 1975

On October 20, 1973, Solicitor General Bork was part of the "Saturday Night Massacre" when President Richard Nixon ordered the firing of Watergate Special Prosecutor Archibald Cox following Cox's request for tapes of his Oval Office conversations. Nixon initially ordered U.S. Attorney General Elliot Richardson to fire Cox. Richardson resigned rather than carry out the order. Richardson's top deputy, Deputy Attorney General William Ruckelshaus, also considered the order "fundamentally wrong" and resigned, making Bork Acting Attorney General.

When Nixon reiterated his order, Bork complied and fired Cox. Bork claimed he carried out the order under pressure from Nixon's attorneys and intended to resign immediately afterward, but was persuaded by Richardson and Ruckelshaus to stay on for the good of the Justice Department. Bork remained Acting Attorney General until the appointment of William B. Saxbe on January 4, 1974. In his posthumously published memoirs, Bork claimed that after he carried out the order, Nixon promised him the next seat on the Supreme Court, though Bork did not take the offer seriously as he believed Watergate had left Nixon too politically compromised to appoint another justice. Nixon never had the chance to carry out his promise, as the next Supreme Court vacancy came after Nixon resigned and Gerald Ford assumed the presidency, with Ford instead appointing John Paul Stevens following the 1975 retirement of William O. Douglas. Ford considered nominating Bork to replace William Colby as CIA Director, but his advisors convinced him to turn first to Edward Bennett Williams and then George H. W. Bush instead due to Bork's unpopularity and lack of experience in intelligence.

=== United States Circuit Judge ===
Bork was a circuit judge for the United States Court of Appeals for the District of Columbia Circuit from 1982 to 1988. He was nominated by President Ronald Reagan on December 7, 1981, was confirmed via voice vote by the Senate on February 8, 1982, and received his commission on February 9, 1982.

One of Bork's opinions while on the D.C. Circuit was Dronenburg v. Zech, 741 F.2d 1388, decided in 1984. The case involved James L. Dronenburg, a sailor who had been administratively discharged from the United States Navy for engaging in homosexual conduct. Dronenburg argued that his discharge violated his right to privacy. His argument was rejected in an opinion written by Bork and joined by Antonin Scalia, in which Bork critiqued the line of Supreme Court cases upholding a right to privacy.

In rejecting Dronenburg's suggestion for a rehearing en banc, the D.C. Circuit issued four separate opinions, including one by Bork (again joined by Scalia), who wrote that "no principle had been articulated [by the Supreme Court] that enabled us to determine whether appellant's case fell within or without that principle."

In 1986, President Reagan considered nominating Bork to the Supreme Court after Chief Justice Warren E. Burger retired. Reagan ultimately nominated then-Associate Justice William Rehnquist to be the next Chief Justice and Bork's D.C. Circuit colleague, Antonin Scalia, for Rehnquist's Associate Justice seat. Some journalists and correspondents believed that if Reagan nominated Bork in 1986, Bork would have likely made the Supreme Court, as the Senate at that time was controlled by the Republicans. However, the Senate Democrats might still have fought to defeat Bork in 1986, and the Republicans' Senate majority at the time was narrow (53–47), which implies that maybe Bork still would have been defeated in 1986, especially when the six Republicans who voted against Bork's 1987 nomination were not first elected in the November 1986 Senate elections.

=== U.S. Supreme Court nomination ===
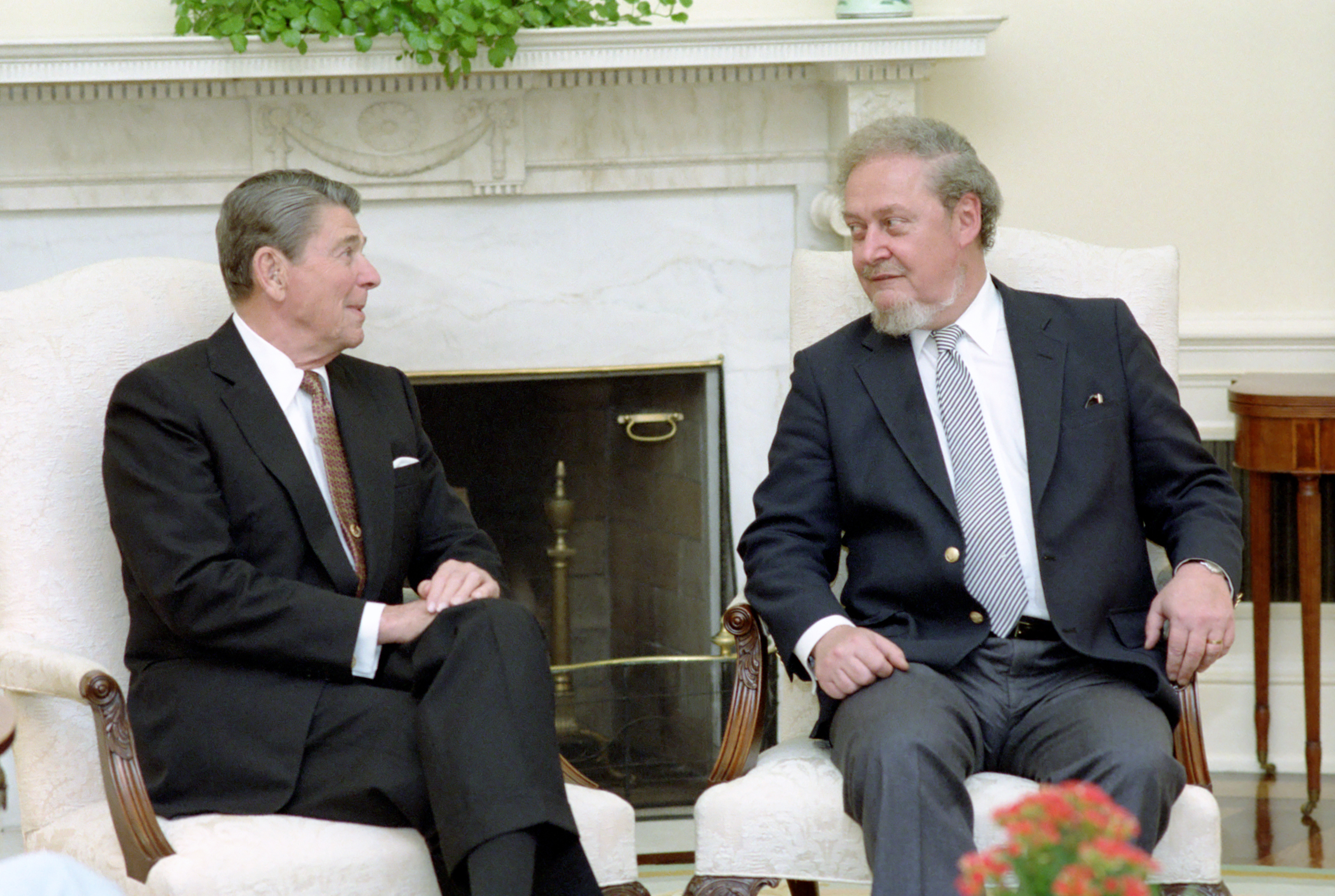
Bork (right) with President Ronald Reagan in the Oval Office in July 1987

President Reagan nominated Bork for associate justice of the Supreme Court on July 1, 1987, to replace retiring Associate Justice Lewis F. Powell Jr. A hotly contested United States Senate debate over Bork's nomination ensued. Opposition was partly fueled by civil rights and women's rights groups, concerned about Bork's opposition to the authority claimed by the federal government to impose standards of voting fairness upon states (at his confirmation hearings for the position of solicitor general, he supported the rights of Southern states to impose a poll tax), and his stated desire to roll back civil rights decisions of the Warren and Burger courts. Bork is one of four Supreme Court nominees (along with William Rehnquist, Samuel Alito, and Brett Kavanaugh) to have been opposed by the American Civil Liberties Union. Bork was criticized for being an "advocate of disproportionate powers for the executive branch of Government, almost executive supremacy", most notably, according to critics, for his role in the Saturday Night Massacre.

Before Justice Powell's expected retirement on June 27, 1987, some Senate Democrats had asked liberal leaders to "form a 'solid phalanx' of opposition" if Reagan nominated an "ideological extremist" to replace him, assuming it would tilt the court rightward. Democrats warned Reagan there would be a fight if Bork were nominated. Nevertheless, Reagan nominated Bork for Powell's seat on July 1, 1987.

Following Bork's nomination, Senator Ted Kennedy took to the Senate floor with a strong condemnation of him, declaring:

Robert Bork's America is a land in which women would be forced into back-alley abortions, blacks would sit at segregated lunch counters, rogue police could break down citizens' doors in midnight raids, schoolchildren could not be taught about evolution, writers and artists could be censored at the whim of the Government, and the doors of the Federal courts would be shut on the fingers of millions of citizens for whom the judiciary is—and is often the only—protector of the individual rights that are the heart of our democracy. ... The damage that President Reagan will do through this nomination, if it is not rejected by the Senate, could live on far beyond the end of his presidential term. President Reagan is still our president. But he should not be able to reach out from the muck of Irangate, reach into the muck of Watergate and impose his reactionary vision of the Constitution on the Supreme Court and the next generation of Americans. No justice would be better than this injustice.

Bork responded, "There was not a line in that speech that was accurate." In an obituary of Kennedy, The Economist remarked that Bork may well have been correct, "but it worked". Bork contended in his book, The Tempting of America, that the brief prepared for then-Senator Joe Biden, Chairman of the Senate Judiciary Committee, "so thoroughly misrepresented a plain record that it easily qualifies as world class in the category of scurrility." Opponents of Bork's nomination found the arguments against him justified, claiming that Bork believed the Civil Rights Act was unconstitutional, and he supported poll taxes, literacy tests for voting, mandated school prayer, and sterilization as a requirement for a job, while opposing free speech rights for non-political speech and privacy rights for gay conduct.

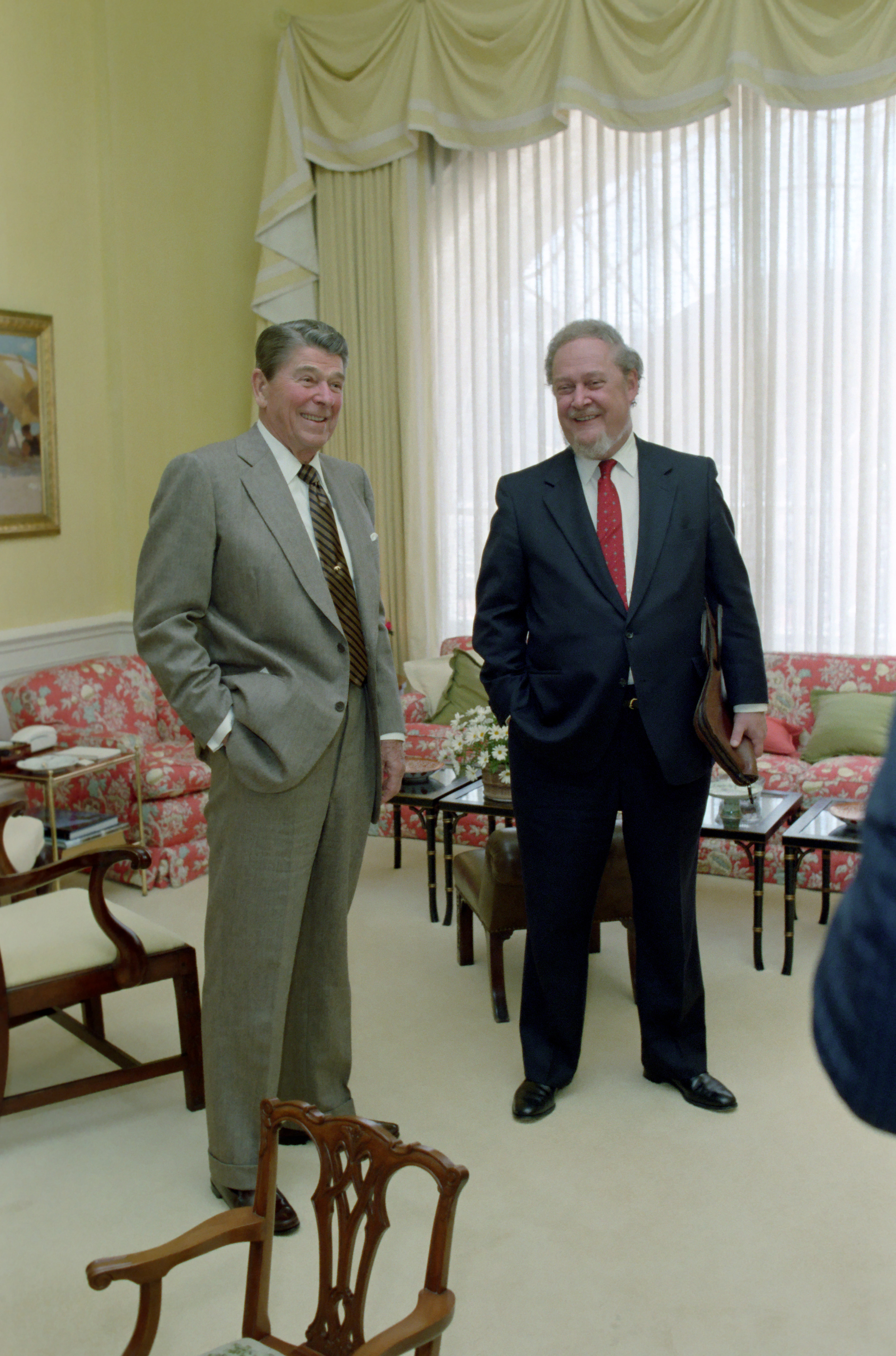
Bork (right) with President Reagan in the White House residence in October 1987

In 1988, an analysis published in The Western Political Quarterly of amicus curiae briefs filed by U.S. Solicitors General during the Warren and Burger courts found that during Bork's tenure in the position during the Nixon and Ford Administrations (1973–1977), Bork took liberal positions in the aggregate as often as Thurgood Marshall did during the Johnson Administration (1965–1967) and more often than Wade H. McCree did during the Carter Administration (1977–1981), in part because Bork filed briefs in favor of the litigants in civil rights cases 75 percent of the time.

Television advertisements produced by People For the American Way and narrated by Gregory Peck attacked Bork as an extremist. Kennedy's speech successfully fueled widespread public skepticism of Bork's nomination. The rapid response to Kennedy's "Robert Bork's America" speech stunned the Reagan White House, and the accusations went unanswered for 2 1/2 months.

During debate over his nomination, Bork's video rental history was leaked to the press. His video rental history was unremarkable, and included such harmless titles as A Day at the Races, Ruthless People, and The Man Who Knew Too Much. Writer Michael Dolan, who obtained a copy of the hand-written list of rentals, wrote about it for the Washington City Paper. Dolan justified accessing the list on the ground that Bork himself had stated that Americans had only such privacy rights as afforded them by direct legislation. The incident led to the enactment of the 1988 Video Privacy Protection Act.

To pro-choice rights legal groups, Bork's originalist views and his belief that the Constitution did not contain a general "right to privacy" were viewed as a clear signal that, should he become a justice of the Supreme Court, he would vote to completely overrule the Court's 1973 decision in Roe v. Wade. Accordingly, a large number of groups mobilized to press for Bork's rejection, and the 1987 Senate confirmation hearings became an intensely partisan battle.

On October 23, 1987, the Senate denied Bork's confirmation, with 42 senators voting in favor and 58 senators voting against. Two Democratic senators (David Boren of Oklahoma, and Fritz Hollings of South Carolina) voted in favor of his nomination, while six Republican senators (John Chafee of Rhode Island, Bob Packwood of Oregon, Arlen Specter of Pennsylvania, Robert Stafford of Vermont, John Warner of Virginia, and Lowell Weicker of Connecticut) voted against it. His defeat in the Senate was the worst of any Supreme Court nominee since George Washington Woodward was defeated 20–29 in 1845, and the third-worst on record.

The seat to which Bork had been nominated went to Judge Anthony Kennedy, who was unanimously approved by the Senate, 97–0. Bork, unhappy with his treatment in the nomination process, resigned his appellate court judgeship in 1988.

=== "Bork" as a verb ===
According to columnist William Safire, the first published use of "bork" as a verb was possibly in The Atlanta Journal-Constitution of August 20, 1987, two months prior to the final vote: "Let's just hope something enduring results for the justice-to-be, like a new verb: Borked." A well known use of the verb "to bork" occurred in July 1991 at a conference of the National Organization for Women in New York City. Feminist Florynce Kennedy addressed the conference on the importance of defeating the nomination of Clarence Thomas to the U.S. Supreme Court, saying: "We're going to bork him. We're going to kill him politically. This little creep, where did he come from?" Thomas was confirmed after the most divisive confirmation hearing in Supreme Court history to that point.

In March 2002, the Oxford English Dictionary added an entry for the verb "bork" as U.S. political slang, with this definition: "To defame or vilify (a person) systematically, esp. in the mass media, usually to prevent his or her appointment to public office; to obstruct or thwart (a person) in this way." Supreme Court Justice Brett Kavanaugh, who occupies the seat Bork was nominated to, used the term during his own contentious Senate confirmation hearing testimony, when he stated: "The behavior of several of the Democratic members of this committee at my hearing a few weeks ago was an embarrassment. But at least it was just a good old-fashioned attempt at borking."

This usage is unrelated to the slang term "borken," meaning (especially of computers) broken or misconfigured; whether the usage of "borked" in political contexts influenced its later development as a variant of "borken" is unclear.

=== Later work ===
Following his failure to be confirmed, Bork resigned his seat on the U.S. Court of Appeals for the D.C. Circuit, and was for several years both a professor at George Mason University School of Law and a senior fellow at the American Enterprise Institute for Public Policy Research.

On June 21, 1995, Netscape executives Jim Barksdale and Marc Andreessen met with Microsoft in Mountain View, CA. This meeting was referenced during the 1998 anti-trust suit brought against Microsoft by the U.S. Department of Justice and twenty states. Robert Bork worked as an advisor to Netscape during that time and famously labeled the June 21 date as "the Don Corleone meeting," referring to Microsoft's attempt to bully Netscape.

Bork later served as a fellow at the Hudson Institute, a visiting professor at the University of Richmond School of Law and a professor at Ave Maria School of Law in Naples, Florida. In 2011, he worked as a legal adviser for the presidential campaign of Republican Mitt Romney.

=== Advocacy of originalism ===
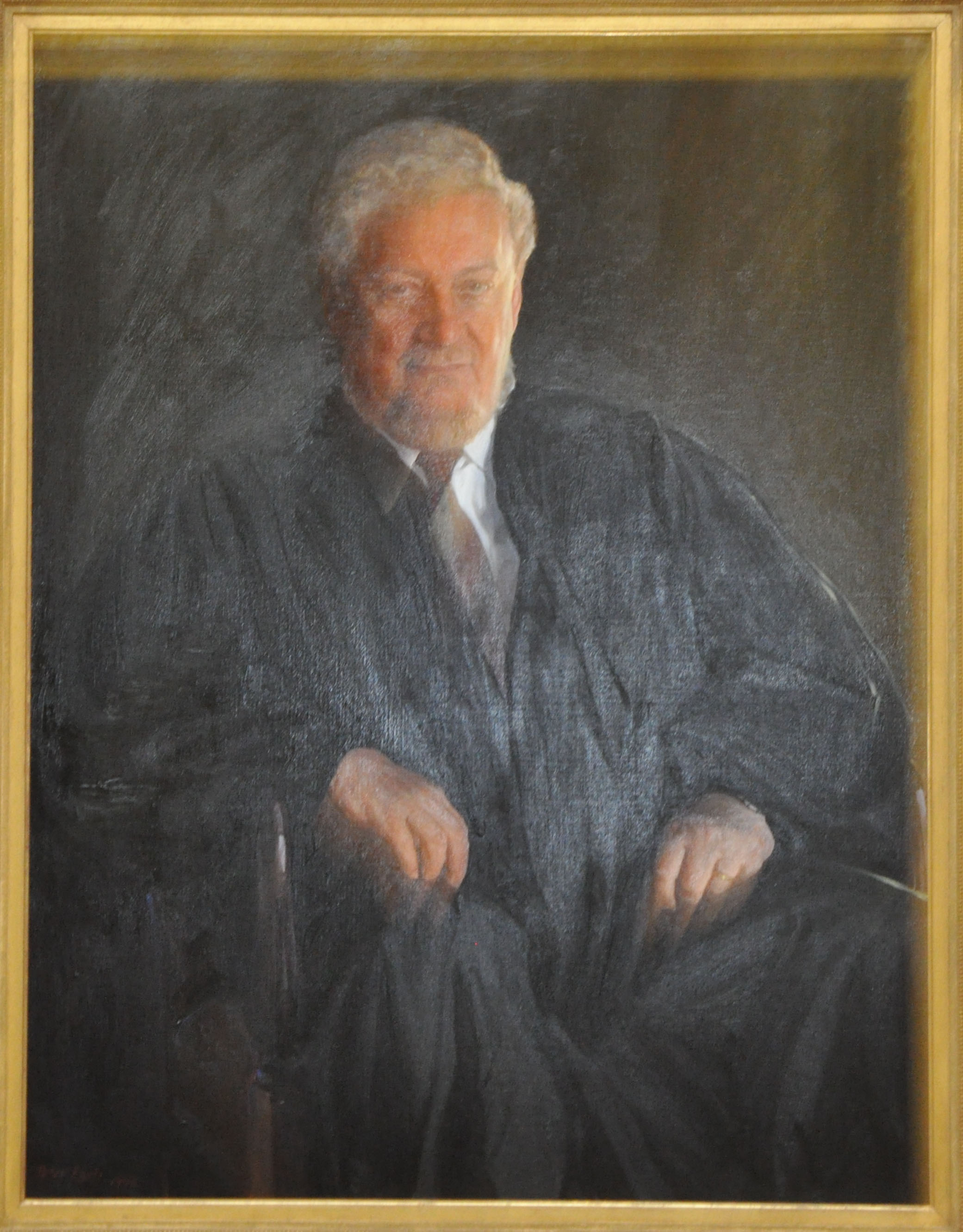
Bork's official judicial portrait, painted by Peter Egeli

Bork is known by American conservatives for his theory that the best way to reconcile the role of the judiciary in the U.S. government against what he terms the "Madisonian" or "counter-majoritarian" dilemma of the judiciary making law without popular approval is for constitutional adjudication to be guided by the framers' original understanding of the United States Constitution. Reiterating that it is a court's task to adjudicate and not to "legislate from the bench," he advocated that judges exercise restraint in deciding cases, emphasizing that the role of the courts is to frame "neutral principles" (a term borrowed from Herbert Wechsler) and not simply ad hoc pronouncements or subjective value judgments. Bork once said, "The truth is that the judge who looks outside the Constitution always looks inside himself and nowhere else."

Bork built on the influential critiques of the Warren Court authored by Alexander Bickel, who criticized the Supreme Court under Earl Warren, alleging shoddy and inconsistent reasoning, undue activism, and misuse of historical materials. Bork's critique was harder-edged than Bickel's, writing: "We are increasingly governed not by law or elected representatives but by an unelected, unrepresentative, unaccountable committee of lawyers applying no will but their own." Bork's writings influenced judges such as Associate Justice Antonin Scalia and Chief Justice William Rehnquist of the U.S. Supreme Court, and sparked vigorous debate within legal academia about how to interpret the Constitution.

Some conservatives criticized Bork's approach. Conservative scholar Harry Jaffa criticized Bork (along with Rehnquist and Scalia) for failing to adhere to natural law principles, and therefore believing that the Constitution says nothing about abortion or gay rights (Jaffa believed that the Constitution prohibited these things.) Robert P. George explained Jaffa's critique this way: "He attacks Rehnquist and Scalia and Bork for their embrace of legal positivism that is inconsistent with the doctrine of natural rights that is embedded in the Constitution they are supposed to be interpreting." Jaffa attacked Bork as insufficiently conservative. Bork, in turn, described adherents of natural law constitutionalism as fanatical.

== Works and views ==
In 2008, Bork explained why he agreed to fire Watergate Special Prosecutor Archibald Cox.

Bork wrote several books, including the two best-sellers The Tempting of America, about his judicial philosophy and his nomination battle, and Slouching Towards Gomorrah: Modern Liberalism and American Decline, in which he argued that the rise of the New Left in the 1960s in the U.S. undermined the moral standards necessary for civil society, and spawned a generation of intellectuals who oppose Western civilization. During the period these books were written, as well as most of his adult life, Bork was an agnostic, a fact used pejoratively behind the scenes by Southern Democrats when speaking to their evangelical constituents during his Supreme Court nomination process. Bork's 1971 Indiana Law Journal article "Neutral Principles and Some First Amendment Problems" has been identified as one of the most cited legal articles of all time.

In The Tempting of America, p. 82, Bork explained his support for the Supreme Court's desegregation decision in Brown v. Board of Education:

By 1954, when Brown came up for decision, it had been apparent for some time that segregation rarely if ever produced equality. Quite aside from any question of psychology, the physical facilities provided for blacks were not as good as those provided for whites. That had been demonstrated in a long series of cases… The Court's realistic choice, therefore, was either to abandon the quest for equality by allowing segregation or to forbid segregation in order to achieve equality. There was no third choice. Either choice would violate one aspect of the original understanding, but there was no possibility of avoiding that. Since equality and segregation were mutually inconsistent, though the ratifiers did not understand that, both could not be honored. When that is seen, it is obvious the Court must choose equality and prohibit state-imposed segregation. The purpose that brought the fourteenth amendment into being was equality before the law, and equality, not separation, was written into the law.

External videos
- Interview with Bork on The Tempting of America, February 26, 1990, C-SPAN
- Presentation by Bork on Slouching Towards Gomorrah, September 30, 1996, C-SPAN
- Booknotes interview with Bork on Slouching Towards Gomorrah, December 1, 1996, C-SPAN
- Presentation by Bork on Coercing Virtue, September 8, 2003, C-SPAN
- After Words interview with Bork on A Time to Speak, January 17, 2009, C-SPAN

Bork opposed the Civil Rights Act of 1964, saying that the provisions within the Act which prohibited racial discrimination by public accommodations were based on a principle of "unsurpassed ugliness". He came to repudiate his earlier views, saying in his 1987 confirmation hearing that the Civil Rights Act and other racial equality legislation of the 1960s "helped bring the nation together in ways which otherwise would not have occurred."

Bork opposed the 1965 Supreme Court ruling in Griswold v. Connecticut, which struck down a Connecticut Comstock Act of 1873 that prohibited the use of contraceptives for married couples. Bork said the decision was "utterly specious", "unprincipled" and "intellectually empty". Bork argued that the Constitution only protected speech that was "explicitly political", and that there were no free speech protections for "scientific, literary or that variety of expression we call obscene or pornographic."

Bork was known for his disregard for the Ninth Amendment. When asked about his views on unenumerated constitutional rights during his confirmation hearings by Arizona Senator Dennis DeConcini, Bork famously compared the Ninth Amendment to an uninterpretable inkblot, too vague for judges to meaningfully enforce.

In 1998, he reviewed High Crimes and Misdemeanors: The Case Against Bill Clinton, conservative pundit Ann Coulter's book on impeaching Clinton, pointing out that "'High crimes and misdemeanors' are not limited to actions that are crimes under federal law."

In 1999, Bork wrote an essay about Thomas More and attacked jury nullification as a "pernicious practice". Bork once quoted More in summarizing his judicial philosophy. In 2003, he published Coercing Virtue: The Worldwide Rule of Judges, an American Enterprise Institute book that includes Bork's philosophical objections to the phenomenon of incorporating international ethical and legal guidelines into the fabric of domestic law. In particular, he focused on problems he viewed as inherent in the federal judiciaries of Israel, Canada, and the United States—countries where he believes courts have exceeded their discretionary powers, discarded precedent and common law and instead substituted their own liberal judgment.

Bork advocated modifying the Constitution to allow Congressional supermajorities to override Supreme Court decisions, similar to the Canadian Charter of Rights and Freedoms' notwithstanding clause. Though Bork had many liberal critics, some of his arguments have earned criticism from conservatives as well. Although an opponent of gun control, Bork denounced what he called the "NRA view" of the Second Amendment, something he described as the "belief that the constitution guarantees a right to Teflon-coated bullets." Instead, he argued that the Second Amendment merely guarantees a right to participate in a government militia, that its intent was to guarantee the right of militia membership, not an individual right to bear arms. He is quoted as saying that the gun lobby's interpretation of the Second Amendment was intentional deception, not "law as integrity," and that states could technically pass a ban on assault weapons.

Bork converted to Catholicism from Presbyterianism in 2003.

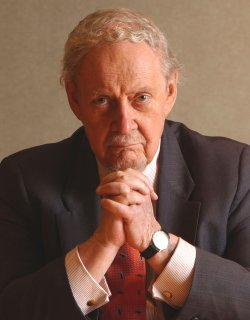
Bork in 2005

In October 2005, Bork publicly criticized the nomination of Harriet Miers to the Supreme Court, saying her nomination was "a disaster on every level."

On June 6, 2007, Bork filed suit in federal court in New York City against the Yale Club over an incident that had occurred a year earlier. Bork alleged that, while trying to reach the dais to speak at an event, he fell, because of the Yale Club's failure to provide any steps or handrail between the floor and the dais. (After his fall, he successfully climbed to the dais and delivered his speech.) According to the complaint, Bork's injuries required surgery, immobilized him for months, forced him to use a cane, and left him with a limp. In May 2008, Bork and the Yale Club reached a confidential, out-of-court settlement.

On June 7, 2007, Bork with several others authored an amicus brief on behalf of Scooter Libby arguing that there was a substantial constitutional question regarding the appointment of the prosecutor in the case, reviving the debate that had previously resulted in the Morrison v. Olson decision.

On December 15, 2007, Bork endorsed Mitt Romney for president in the 2008 presidential election. He repeated this endorsement on August 2, 2011, during Romney's second campaign for the White House.

A 2008 issue of the Harvard Journal of Law and Public Policy collected essays in tribute to Bork. Authors included Frank H. Easterbrook, George Priest, and Douglas Ginsburg.

== Personal life ==
Bork was married to Claire Davidson from 1952 until her death from cancer in 1980. They had a daughter and two sons. In 1982, he married Mary Ellen Pohl, a Catholic religious sister turned activist. Bork Jr. is a prominent conservative activist who is currently president of the Antitrust Education Project.

== Death ==
Bork died of complications from heart disease at the Virginia Hospital Center in Arlington County, Virginia, on December 19, 2012, at age 85. Following his death, Scalia referred to Bork as "one of the most influential legal scholars of the past 50 years" and "a good man and a loyal citizen". He is interred at Fairfax Memorial Park in Fairfax, Virginia.

== Selected works ==
Books

- Bork, Robert H. (1978). The Antitrust Paradox. New York: Free Press. ISBN 0-465-00369-9; 2nd edition (1993).
- — (1990). The Tempting of America. New York: Free Press. ISBN 0-684-84337-4.
- — (1996). Slouching Towards Gomorrah: Modern Liberalism and American Decline. New York: ReganBooks. ISBN 0-06-039163-4.
- — (2003). Coercing Virtue: The Worldwide Rule of Judges. Washington, DC: American Enterprise Institute Press. ISBN 0-8447-4162-0.
- — (ed.) (2005). A Country I Do Not Recognize: The Legal Assault on American Values. Stanford: Hoover Institution Press. ISBN 0-8179-4602-0.
- — (2008) A Time to Speak: Selected Writings and Arguments. Wilmington, DL: ISI Books. ISBN 978-1-933859-68-2
- — (2013) Saving Justice: Watergate, the Saturday Night Massacre, and Other Adventures of a Solicitor General. New York: Encounter Books. ISBN 978-1-59403-681-1

Articles

- Bork, Robert H. (1954). "Vertical Integration and the Sherman Act: The Legal History of an Economic Misconception". University of Chicago Law Review. 22 (1): 157–201. doi:10.2307/1598229. JSTOR 1598229.
- —; Bowman, Ward S. (1965). "The Crisis in Antitrust". Columbia Law Review. 65 (3): 363–78. doi:10.2307/1120380. JSTOR 1120380.
- — (1966). "The Rule of Reason and the Per Se Concept: Price Fixing and Market Division". The Yale Law Journal. 75 (3): 373–476. doi:10.2307/794663. JSTOR 794663.
- — (1966). "Legislative Intent and the Policy of the Sherman Act". The Journal of Law and Economics. 9: 7–48. doi:10.1086/466617. JSTOR 724991.
- — (1967). "The Goals of Antitrust". American Economic Review. 57 (2): 242–53. JSTOR 1821625.
- — (1971). "Neutral Principles and Some First Amendment Problems". Indiana Law Journal. 47 (1): 1–35.
- — (1979). "The Impossibility of Finding Welfare Rights in the Constitution". Washington University Law Quarterly. 1979: 695–701.
- — (1986). "The Constitution, Original Intent, and Economic Rights". San Diego Law Review. 23 (4): 823–32.

== See also ==
- Bork tapes
- Originalism
- Ronald Reagan Supreme Court candidates
- Swiftboating
- Unsuccessful nominations to the Supreme Court of the United States

Legal offices
| Preceded by Erwin Griswold | Solicitor General of the United States; 1973–1977 | Succeeded by Daniel Mortimer Friedman; Acting |
| Preceded by William Ruckelshaus; Acting | United States Attorney General; Acting; 1973–1974 | Succeeded by William B. Saxbe |
| Preceded by Carl E. McGowan | Judge of the United States Court of Appeals for the District of Columbia Circuit; 1982–1988 | Succeeded by Clarence Thomas |
