= The Antitrust Paradox =

Book by Robert Bork

- Author: Robert H. Bork
- Language: English
- Subject: United States antitrust law
- Genre: Non-fiction
- Publisher: Basic Books
- Publication date: April 20, 1978
- Publication place: United States
- ISBN: 978-0-465-00369-3

The Antitrust Paradox is a 1978 book by Robert Bork that criticizes the state of United States antitrust law in the 1970s. A second edition, updated to reflect substantial changes in the law, was published in 1993. Bork credited Aaron Director as well as other economists from the University of Chicago as influences.

Bork argues that the original intent of antitrust laws as well as economic efficiency makes consumer welfare and the protection of competition, rather than competitors, the only goals of antitrust law. Thus, while it was appropriate to prohibit cartels that fix prices and divide markets and mergers that create monopolies, practices that are allegedly exclusionary, such as vertical agreements and price discrimination, did not harm consumers and so should not be prohibited. The paradox of antitrust enforcement was that legal intervention artificially raised prices by protecting inefficient enterprises from competition.

The book proved influential, and has been cited by over a hundred courts. From 1977 to 2007, the Supreme Court of the United States repeatedly adopted views stated in The Antitrust Paradox in such cases as Continental Television, Inc. v. GTE Sylvania, Inc., 433 U.S. 36 (1977), Broadcast Music, Inc. v. CBS, Inc., NCAA v. Board of Regents of the University of Oklahoma, Spectrum Sports, Inc. v. McQuillan, State Oil Co. v. Khan, Verizon v. Trinko, and Leegin Creative Leather Products, Inc. v. PSKS, Inc., legalizing many practices previously prohibited.

The Antitrust Paradox has shaped antitrust law in several ways, prominently by focusing the discipline on efficiency and articulating its goal as "consumer welfare". Many lawyers and economists, however, have pointed out that Bork was wrong in his analysis of the legislative intent of the Sherman Antitrust Act of 1890 and have criticized him for incorrect economic assumptions and analytical errors. One of the key criticisms focuses on Bork's use of the term "consumer welfare", which became the stated goal of American antitrust law.

Bork argues that Congress enacted the Sherman Act as a "consumer welfare prescription". The Supreme Court embraced this view in Reiter v. Sonotone Corp., 442 U.S. 330 (1979) and in all subsequent decisions. Many scholars, however, have shown that Congress had several motives for the adoption of the Sherman Act, probably none of which was "consumer welfare". Moreover, Bork's use of the term "consumer welfare" was inconsistent with its use by economists. When the Supreme Court adopted the view that Congress enacted the Sherman Act as a "consumer welfare prescription", it did not define the term, which has remained ambiguous.

The book's title is referenced in Amazon's Antitrust Paradox, a paper by Lina Khan who became Chair of the Federal Trade Commission. Her paper seeks to reframe and strengthen antitrust law.

== Publication history ==
- Bork, Robert H. (1978). The Antitrust Paradox. New York: Free Press. ISBN 0-465-00369-9.
- Bork, Robert H. (1993). The Antitrust Paradox (second edition). New York: Free Press. ISBN 0-02-904456-1.

== See also ==
- Law and economics
- Neoliberalism
- Powell Memorandum
