= Robert Bork Supreme Court nomination =

1987 American failed judicial nomination

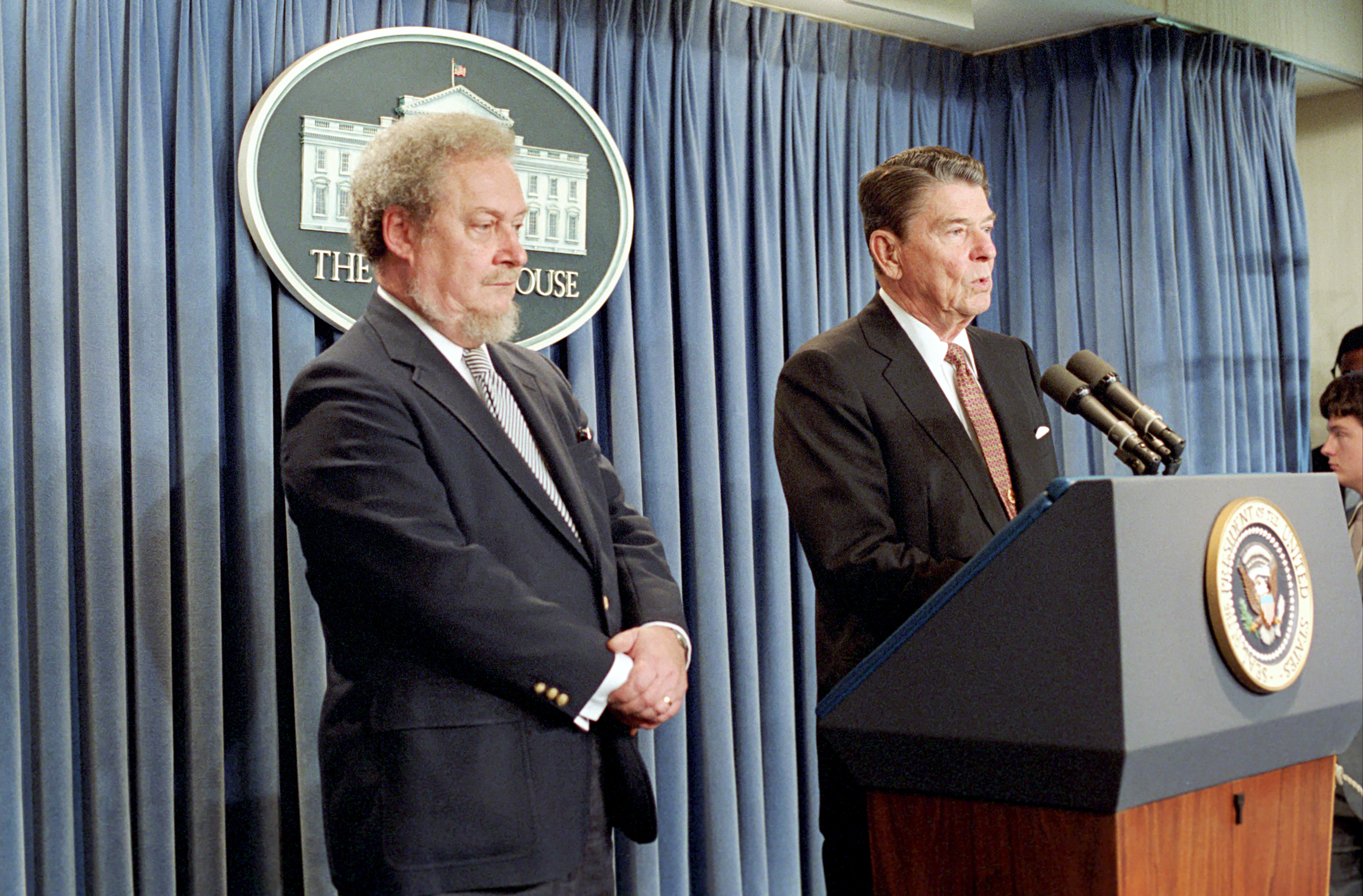
- President Ronald Reagan announces from the White House Press Room Bork's nomination on July 1, 1987
- Nominee: Robert Bork
- Nominated by: Ronald Reagan (President of the United States)
- Succeeding: Lewis F. Powell Jr. (Associate Justice of the Supreme Court of the United States)
- Date nominated: July 1, 1987
- Date rejected: October 23, 1987
- Outcome: Rejected by the U.S. Senate

Senate Judiciary Committee motion to report favorably
- Votes in favor: 5
- Votes against: 9
- Result: Rejected

Senate Judiciary Committee motion to report unfavorably
- Votes in favor: 9
- Votes against: 5
- Result: Approved

Senate confirmation vote
- Votes in favor: 42
- Votes against: 58
- Result: Rejected

On July 1, 1987, President Ronald Reagan nominated Judge Robert Bork for Associate Justice of the Supreme Court of the United States, to succeed Lewis F. Powell Jr., who had earlier announced his retirement. At the time of his nomination, Bork was a judge on the United States Court of Appeals for the District of Columbia Circuit, a position to which he had been appointed by President Reagan in 1982.

Bork's nomination precipitated contentious debate. Opposition to his nomination centered on his perceived willingness to roll back the civil rights rulings of the Warren and Burger courts, and his role in the Saturday Night Massacre during the Watergate scandal. On October 23, 1987, the United States Senate rejected Robert Bork's nomination to the Supreme Court by a roll-call vote of 42–58. This is the most recent Supreme Court nomination to be rejected by vote of the Senate.

Reagan subsequently announced his intention to nominate Douglas H. Ginsburg to succeed Powell, but Ginsburg withdrew from consideration following revelations of his earlier marijuana use. Instead, Reagan nominated Anthony Kennedy, who was viewed as a mainstream conservative Republican. Kennedy was unanimously confirmed in February 1988.

== Nomination ==
United States Supreme Court Associate Justice Lewis F. Powell Jr., was considered a moderate conservative, but referred to as the "swing vote" in close decisions at the time. After he announced his retirement on June 26, 1987, Senate Democrats asked liberal leaders to form a "solid phalanx" to oppose an "ideological extremist" replacement for Powell. Democrats warned Reagan there would be a fight over the nomination if Bork became the nominee.

President Reagan nominated Bork for Powell's seat on July 1, 1987. Bork had long been interested in the position; President Richard Nixon promised him the next seat on the Supreme Court, following Bork's compliance in firing Special Prosecutor Archibald Cox during the controversial "Saturday Night Massacre" of October 1973. Nixon was unable to carry out the promise before his resignation on August 9, 1974. When the next Supreme Court vacancy occurred in 1975 due to the retirement of William O. Douglas, civil rights groups expressed deep opposition to Bork being nominated by President Gerald Ford, and Douglas' seat went to John Paul Stevens. Bork was also a finalist to be nominated in 1986 after Reagan nominated then-Associate Justice William Rehnquist to be Chief Justice of the United States following the retirement of Warren Burger, but Reagan nominated Antonin Scalia for Rehnquist's associate justice seat. Some journalists and correspondents believed that if Reagan had nominated Bork in 1986, he likely would have been confirmed by the Republican-controlled Senate and joined the Court. Another interpretation suggests that the Democrats would have fought to block Bork even in 1986, given that the Republican majority in the Senate (53–47) was already quite narrow. This implies that Bork would certainly have faced a very difficult environment in 1986 as well, especially given that all six Republicans (Note: John Chafee, Bob Packwood, Arlen Specter, Robert Stafford, John Warner, and Lowell Weicker.) who joined the Democrats in the roll-call vote already held their seats at that time.

== Response to the nomination ==
Within 45 minutes of Bork's nomination to the Court, Senator Ted Kennedy (D-MA) took to the Senate floor with a strong condemnation of Bork in a nationally televised speech, declaring:

Robert Bork's America is a land in which women would be forced into back-alley abortions, blacks would sit at segregated lunch counters, rogue police could break down citizens' doors in midnight raids, and schoolchildren could not be taught about evolution, writers and artists would be censored at the whim of the Government, and the doors of the Federal courts would be shut on the fingers of millions of citizens.

Bork responded, "There was not a line in that speech that was accurate." In 1988, an analysis published in the Western Political Quarterly of amicus curiae briefs filed by U.S. Solicitors General during the Warren and Burger Courts found that during Bork's tenure in the position during the Nixon and Ford Administrations (1973–1977), Bork took liberal positions in the aggregate as often as Thurgood Marshall did during the Johnson Administration (1965–1967), and more often than Wade H. McCree did during the Carter Administration (1977–1981), in part because Bork filed briefs in favor of the litigants in civil rights cases 75 percent of the time (contradicting a previous review of his civil rights record published in 1983).

On July 5, 1987, NAACP executive director Benjamin Hooks described their position on the Bork nomination: "We will fight it all the way – until hell freezes over, and then we'll skate across on the ice." A brief was prepared for Joe Biden, head of the Senate Judiciary Committee, called the Biden Report. Bork later said in his book The Tempting of America that the report "so thoroughly misrepresented a plain record that it easily qualifies as world class in the category of scurrility". TV ads produced by People For the American Way, and narrated by Gregory Peck, attacked Bork as an extremist. Along with Kennedy's speech, these ads successfully fueled widespread public skepticism of Bork's nomination. The rapid response of Kennedy's "Robert Bork's America" speech stunned the Reagan White House; conservatives, though they considered Kennedy's accusations slanderous, did not respond for more than two months.

== Judiciary Committee review ==
=== Confirmation hearings ===
A heated debate over Bork's nomination ensued, partly fueled by strong opposition by civil and women's rights groups concerned with Bork's perceived willingness to roll back civil rights rulings of the Warren and Burger courts, and his opposition to the federal government's right to impose standards of voting fairness upon the states.

Bork is one of only four Supreme Court nominees to ever be opposed by the ACLU, along with William Rehnquist, Samuel Alito, and Brett Kavanaugh. Bork was also criticized for being an "advocate of disproportionate powers for the executive branch of Government, almost executive supremacy", particularly for the notion of the President of the United States having unrestrained authority, especially unitary executive theory, as demonstrated by his role in the 1973 "Saturday Night Massacre", when he fired the then–United States Special Prosecutor, Archibald Cox in order to protect Richard Nixon from being investigated in the Watergate scandal. Bork's firing of Cox was ruled illegal by the United States District Court for the District of Columbia in Nader v. Bork soon afterwards.

During debate over his nomination, a list of videotapes Bork had rented was leaked to the press. Although the tapes included in his video rental history were innocuous and non-salacious, including titles such as A Day at the Races, Ruthless People, and The Man Who Knew Too Much, the leakage and surrounding press coverage led to the enactment of the 1988 Video Privacy Protection Act in response. Michael Dolan, a writer at the Washington City Paper who first obtained and wrote about the list, was inspired by Bork's opposition to privacy protections beyond those explicitly outlined in the Constitution.

To pro-choice legal groups, Bork's originalist views and his belief that the Constitution does not protect a "right to privacy" were viewed as a clear signal that, should he become a justice of the Supreme Court, he would vote to completely overrule the Supreme Court's 1973 decision Roe v. Wade. These groups also claimed that Bork's marriage to Mary Ellen Pohl, a former Roman Catholic nun and anti-abortion supporter would allow her to influence his decisions on the abortion issue. (Note: Bork himself became a Catholic in July 2003.) Accordingly, a large number of left-wing groups mobilized to press for Bork's rejection, and his confirmation hearings became an intensely partisan battle. Bork was faulted for his bluntness before the committee, including his criticism of the reasoning underlying Roe v. Wade. Simultaneously, however, his supporters expressed frustration that some of Bork's most controversial and conservative views, including those on the scope of the First Amendment and the Equal Protection clause of the Fourteenth Amendment, as expressed in his writings and past opinions, had been suddenly moderated for his testimony before the committee.

As Chairman of the Judiciary Committee, Senator Joe Biden presided over Bork's hearing. Biden stated his opposition to Bork soon after the nomination, reversing an approval in an interview of a hypothetical Bork nomination he had made the previous year, and angering conservatives who saw this as evidence that he could not conduct the hearings dispassionately. Near the close of the hearings, Biden, whose 1988 presidential campaign had collapsed in the middle of the hearings, won praise for conducting the proceedings fairly and with good humor and courage. Rejecting some of the arguments that other Bork opponents were making, Biden framed his discussion around the belief that the Constitution provides rights to liberty and privacy that extend beyond those explicitly enumerated in the text, and that Bork's strong originalism was ideologically incompatible with that view.

=== Committee vote ===
Roll call votes to report the Bork nomination
Senator	Party	State	Report favorably	Report unfavorably
Joe Biden	Dem.	Delaware	Nay	Yea
Robert Byrd	Dem.	West Virginia	Nay	Yea
Dennis DeConcini	Dem.	Arizona	Nay	Yea
Chuck Grassley	Rep.	Iowa	Yea	Nay
Orrin Hatch	Rep.	Utah	Yea	Nay
Howell Heflin	Dem.	Alabama	Nay	Yea
Gordon J. Humphrey	Rep.	New Hampshire	Yea	Nay
Ted Kennedy	Dem.	Massachusetts	Nay	Yea
Patrick Leahy	Dem.	Vermont	Nay	Yea
Howard Metzenbaum	Dem.	Ohio	Nay	Yea
Paul Simon	Dem.	Illinois	Nay	Yea
Alan Simpson	Rep.	Wyoming	Yea	Nay
Arlen Specter	Rep.	Pennsylvania	Nay	Yea
Strom Thurmond	Rep.	South Carolina	Yea	Nay

On October 6, the Senate Judiciary Committee held two votes on the Bork nomination. The committee first voted on a motion to send the nomination to the floor with a favorable recommendation, which was defeated 5–9. It next voted on a motion to send the nomination to the floor with an unfavorable recommendation, which passed 9–5. Republican Arlen Specter voted with the Democratic majority on both votes.

Following the decisive vote, Bork's political support in the Senate quickly eroded, making the nomination's ultimate defeat all but certain, and it was widely expected that he would withdraw his name from further consideration. Nonetheless, on October 9, Bork announced his belief that:

There should be a full debate and a final Senate decision. In deciding on this course, I harbor no illusions. But a crucial principle is at stake. That principle is the way we select the men and women who guard the liberties of all the American people. That should not be done through public campaigns of distortion. If I withdraw now, that campaign would be seen as a success, and it would be mounted against future nominees. For the sake of the Federal judiciary and the American people, that must not happen. The deliberative process must be restored.

== Full Senate vote ==
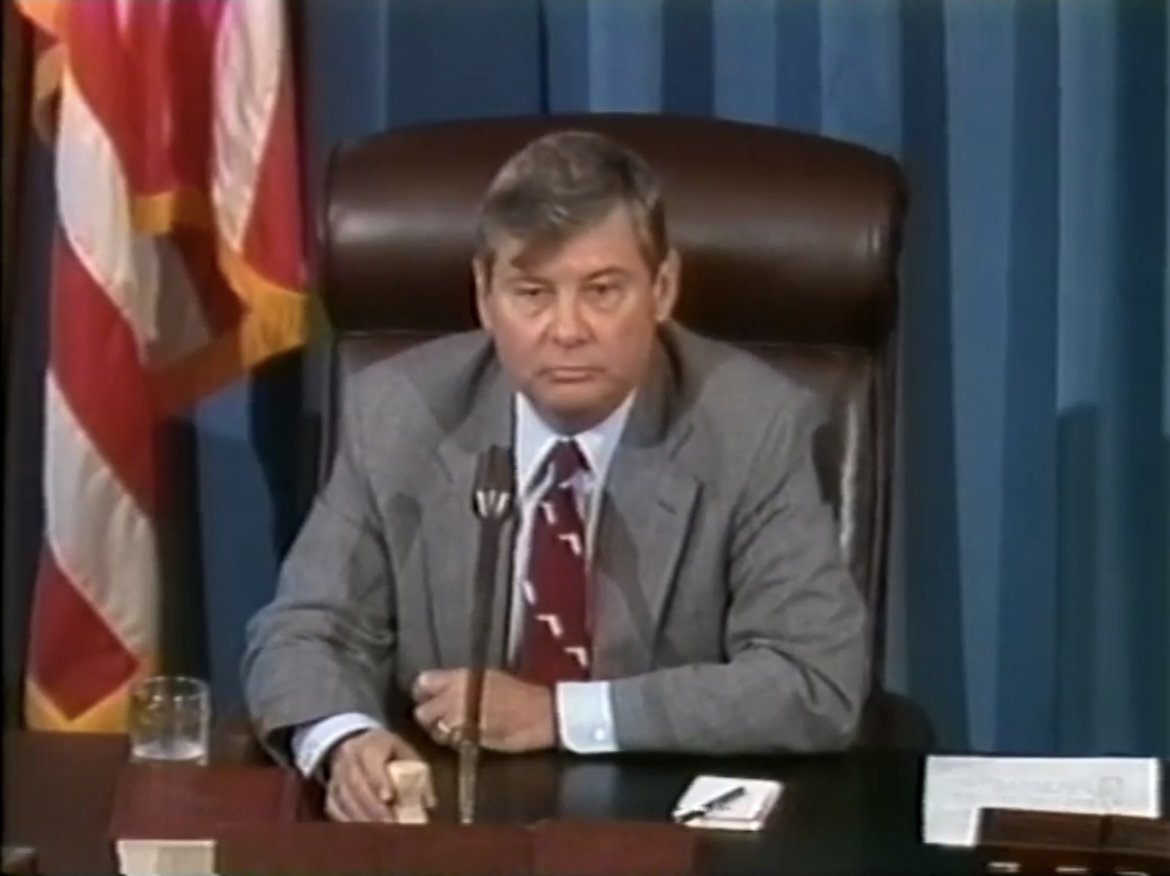
Senator Bob Graham of Florida presiding over the Senate during the vote on Bork's nomination

On October 23, 1987, the Senate rejected Robert Bork's nomination to the Supreme Court by a vote of 42–58. Altogether, two Democrats and 40 Republicans voted in favor of confirmation, whereas 52 Democrats and six Republicans voted against.

Roll call vote on the nomination
Senator	Party	State	Vote
Brock Adams	Dem.	Washington	Nay
William L. Armstrong	Rep.	Colorado	Yea
Max Baucus	Dem.	Montana	Nay
Lloyd Bentsen	Dem.	Texas	Nay
Joe Biden	Dem.	Delaware	Nay
Jeff Bingaman	Dem.	New Mexico	Nay
Kit Bond	Rep.	Missouri	Yea
David Boren	Dem.	Oklahoma	Yea
Rudy Boschwitz	Rep.	Minnesota	Yea
Bill Bradley	Dem.	New Jersey	Nay
John Breaux	Dem.	Louisiana	Nay
Dale Bumpers	Dem.	Arkansas	Nay
Quentin Burdick	Dem.	North Dakota	Nay
Robert Byrd	Dem.	West Virginia	Nay
John Chafee	Rep.	Rhode Island	Nay
Lawton Chiles	Dem.	Florida	Nay
Thad Cochran	Rep.	Mississippi	Yea
William Cohen	Rep.	Maine	Yea
Kent Conrad	Dem.	North Dakota	Nay
Alan Cranston	Dem.	California	Nay
Al D'Amato	Rep.	New York	Yea
John Danforth	Rep.	Missouri	Yea
Tom Daschle	Dem.	South Dakota	Nay
Dennis DeConcini	Dem.	Arizona	Nay
Alan J. Dixon	Dem.	Illinois	Nay
Chris Dodd	Dem.	Connecticut	Nay
Bob Dole	Rep.	Kansas	Yea
Pete Domenici	Rep.	New Mexico	Yea
David Durenberger	Rep.	Minnesota	Yea
Daniel J. Evans	Rep.	Washington	Yea
J. James Exon	Dem.	Nebraska	Nay
Wendell Ford	Dem.	Kentucky	Nay
Wyche Fowler	Dem.	Georgia	Nay
Jake Garn	Rep.	Utah	Yea
John Glenn	Dem.	Ohio	Nay
Al Gore	Dem.	Tennessee	Nay
Bob Graham	Dem.	Florida	Nay
Phil Gramm	Rep.	Texas	Yea
Chuck Grassley	Rep.	Iowa	Yea
Tom Harkin	Dem.	Iowa	Nay
Orrin Hatch	Rep.	Utah	Yea
Mark Hatfield	Rep.	Oregon	Yea
Chic Hecht	Rep.	Nevada	Yea
Howell Heflin	Dem.	Alabama	Nay
John Heinz	Rep.	Pennsylvania	Yea
Jesse Helms	Rep.	North Carolina	Yea
Ernest Hollings	Dem.	South Carolina	Yea
Gordon J. Humphrey	Rep.	New Hampshire	Yea
Daniel Inouye	Dem.	Hawaii	Nay
J. Bennett Johnston	Dem.	Louisiana	Nay
David Karnes	Rep.	Nebraska	Yea
Nancy Kassebaum	Rep.	Kansas	Yea
Bob Kasten	Rep.	Wisconsin	Yea
Ted Kennedy	Dem.	Massachusetts	Nay
John Kerry	Dem.	Massachusetts	Nay
Frank Lautenberg	Dem.	New Jersey	Nay
Patrick Leahy	Dem.	Vermont	Nay
Carl Levin	Dem.	Michigan	Nay
Richard Lugar	Rep.	Indiana	Yea
Spark Matsunaga	Dem.	Hawaii	Nay
John McCain	Rep.	Arizona	Yea
James A. McClure	Rep.	Idaho	Yea
Mitch McConnell	Rep.	Kentucky	Yea
John Melcher	Dem.	Montana	Nay
Howard Metzenbaum	Dem.	Ohio	Nay
Barbara Mikulski	Dem.	Maryland	Nay
George J. Mitchell	Dem.	Maine	Nay
Daniel Patrick Moynihan	Dem.	New York	Nay
Frank Murkowski	Rep.	Alaska	Yea
Don Nickles	Rep.	Oklahoma	Yea
Sam Nunn	Dem.	Georgia	Nay
Bob Packwood	Rep.	Oregon	Nay
Claiborne Pell	Dem.	Rhode Island	Nay
Larry Pressler	Rep.	South Dakota	Yea
William Proxmire	Dem.	Wisconsin	Nay
David Pryor	Dem.	Arkansas	Nay
Dan Quayle	Rep.	Indiana	Yea
Harry Reid	Dem.	Nevada	Nay
Donald Riegle	Dem.	Michigan	Nay
Jay Rockefeller	Dem.	West Virginia	Nay
William Roth	Rep.	Delaware	Yea
Warren Rudman	Rep.	New Hampshire	Yea
Terry Sanford	Dem.	North Carolina	Nay
Paul Sarbanes	Dem.	Maryland	Nay
Jim Sasser	Dem.	Tennessee	Nay
Richard Shelby	Dem.	Alabama	Nay
Paul Simon	Dem.	Illinois	Nay
Alan Simpson	Rep.	Wyoming	Yea
Arlen Specter	Rep.	Pennsylvania	Nay
Robert Stafford	Rep.	Vermont	Nay
John C. Stennis	Dem.	Mississippi	Nay
Ted Stevens	Rep.	Alaska	Yea
Steve Symms	Rep.	Idaho	Yea
Strom Thurmond	Rep.	South Carolina	Yea
Paul Trible	Rep.	Virginia	Yea
Malcolm Wallop	Rep.	Wyoming	Yea
John Warner	Rep.	Virginia	Nay
Lowell Weicker	Rep.	Connecticut	Nay
Pete Wilson	Rep.	California	Yea
Tim Wirth	Dem.	Colorado	Nay

== Impact ==
President Reagan's address to the nation from the Oval Office regarding the Bork Supreme Court nomination on October 14, 1987

The following month, President Reagan nominated Judge Anthony Kennedy for the position on the Court (after the name of a second nominee, Douglas H. Ginsburg, was withdrawn). He was subsequently confirmed by the Senate by a 97–0 vote.

The Bork confirmation vote was one of the most controversial votes on a Supreme Court nominee in Senate history. Unhappy with his treatment during the nomination process, Bork resigned his appellate court judgeship the following year.

In 2011, New York Times columnist Joe Nocera claimed that "[t]he Bork fight, in some ways, was the beginning of the end of civil discourse in politics. The anger between Democrats and Republicans, the unwillingness to work together, the profound mistrust – the line from Bork to today's ugly politics is a straight one." Nocera cited Democratic activist Ann Lewis, who wrote that if Bork's nomination "were carried out as an internal Senate debate, we would have deep and thoughtful discussions about the Constitution, and then we would lose."

Decades later, the failure of Bork's nomination is seen through a deeply partisan lens:

The Republicans claimed, with not a little justification, that this was the first time a jurist was rejected for his views, rather than a lack of qualifications; the Democrats claimed, with not a little justification, that it was precisely those inflammatory views that attracted Ronald Reagan to him in the first place – that Bork's nomination itself was a provocation.

=== "Bork" as a verb ===
William Safire of The New York Times attributes "possibly" the first use of bork as a verb to The Atlanta Journal-Constitution of August 20, 1987. In fact, the word had appeared a few days earlier, in a newspaper opinion piece dated August 11. Safire defines "to bork" by reference "to the way Democrats savaged Ronald Reagan's nominee, the Appeals Court judge Robert H. Bork, the year before". This definition stems from the history of the fight over Bork's nomination. In March 2002, the word was added to the Oxford Dictionary under "bork"; its definition extends beyond judicial nominees, stating that people who bork others "usually [do so] with the aim of preventing [a person's] appointment to public office".

A notable use of the verb to bork occurred in July 1991 at a conference of the National Organization for Women in New York City. Feminist Florynce Kennedy addressed the conference on the importance of defeating the nomination of Clarence Thomas to the U.S. Supreme Court. She said: "We're going to bork him. We're going to kill him politically ... This little creep, where did he come from?" Thomas was subsequently confirmed after a contentious confirmation hearing.
