= Demographics of the Supreme Court of the United States =

The demographics of the Supreme Court of the United States encompass the gender, ethnicity, and religious, geographic, and economic backgrounds of the 116 people who have been appointed and confirmed as justices to the Supreme Court. Some of these characteristics have been raised as an issue since the court was established in 1789. For its first 180 years, justices were almost always white male Protestants of Anglo or Northwestern European descent.

Prior to the 20th century, a few Catholics were appointed, but concerns about diversity on the court were mainly in terms of geographic diversity, to represent all geographic regions of the country, as opposed to ethnic, religious, or gender diversity. The 20th century saw the first appointment of justices who were Jewish (Louis Brandeis, 1916), African-American (Thurgood Marshall, 1967), female (Sandra Day O'Connor, 1981), and Italian-American (Antonin Scalia, 1986). The first appointment of a Hispanic justice was in the 21st century with Sonia Sotomayor in 2009, with the possible exception of Justice Benjamin Cardozo, a Sephardi Jew of Portuguese descent, who was appointed in 1932.

In spite of the interest in the court's demographics and the symbolism accompanying the inevitably political appointment process, and the views of some commentators that no demographic considerations should arise in the selection process, the gender, race, educational background or religious views of the justices has played little documented role in their jurisprudence. For example, the opinions of the first two African-American justices reflected radically different judicial philosophies; William Brennan and Antonin Scalia shared Catholic faith and a Harvard Law School education, but shared little in the way of jurisprudential philosophies. The court's first two female justices voted together no more often than with their male colleagues, and historian Thomas R. Marshall writes that no particular "female perspective" can be discerned from their opinions.

== Geographic background ==
For most of the existence of the court, geographic diversity was a key concern of presidents in choosing justices to appoint. This was prompted in part by the early practice of Supreme Court justices also "riding circuit"—individually hearing cases in different regions of the country. In 1789, the United States was divided into judicial circuits, and from that time until 1891, Supreme Court justices also acted as judges within those individual circuits. George Washington was careful to make appointments "with no two justices serving at the same time hailing from the same state". Abraham Lincoln broke with this tradition during the Civil War, and "by the late 1880s presidents disregarded it with increasing frequency".

Although the importance of regionalism declined, it still arose from time to time. For example, in appointing Benjamin Cardozo in 1929, President Hoover was as concerned about the controversy over having three New York justices on the court as he was about having two Jewish justices. David M. O'Brien notes that "from the appointment of John Rutledge from South Carolina in 1789 until the retirement of Hugo Black [from Alabama] in 1971, with the exception of the Reconstruction decade of 1866–1876, there was always a southerner on the bench. Until 1867, the sixth seat was reserved as the "southern seat". Until Cardozo's appointment in 1932, the third seat was reserved for New Englanders." The westward expansion of the U.S. led to concerns that the western states should be represented on the court as well, which purportedly prompted William Howard Taft to make his 1910 appointment of Willis Van Devanter of Wyoming.

Geographic balance was sought in the 1970s, when Nixon attempted to employ a "Southern strategy", hoping to secure support from Southern states by nominating judges from the region. Nixon unsuccessfully nominated Southerners Clement Haynsworth of South Carolina and G. Harrold Carswell of Florida, before finally succeeding with the nomination of Harry Blackmun of Minnesota. The issue of regional diversity was again raised with the 2010 retirement of John Paul Stevens, who had been appointed from the midwestern Seventh Circuit, leaving the court with all but one Justice having been appointed from states on the East Coast.

The majority of justices have come from the Northeastern United States, with most hailing from New York and Massachusetts. 50% of justices have come from just 6 states.

Some states have been over-represented, partly because there were fewer states from which early justices could be appointed. New York has produced fifteen justices, three of whom have served as chief justice. Ohio has produced ten justices, including two chief justices; Massachusetts nine (including Stephen Breyer and Elena Kagan); and Virginia eight, including three chief justices. There have been six justices each from Pennsylvania, Tennessee, and Maryland (the latter including current chief justice John Roberts and current associate justice Brett Kavanaugh); and five each from Kentucky and New Jersey. States that have produced four justices include California, Illinois (one chief and three associates each), and Georgia (the third including current associate justice Clarence Thomas).

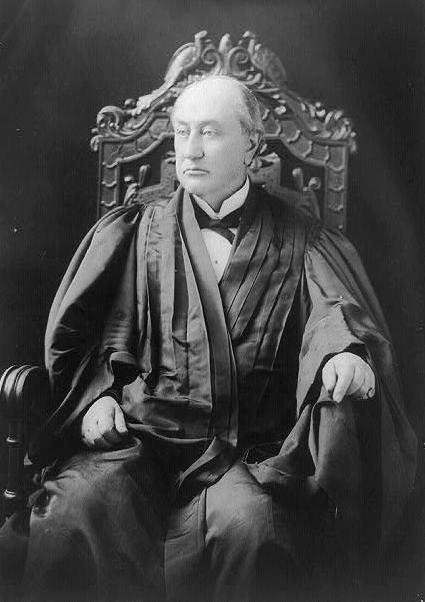
David J. Brewer was born to missionary parents in Smyrna, in the Ottoman Empire, (now İzmir, Turkey).

=== Other states from which justices have been appointed ===
- Three justices have been appointed from Connecticut (2 chiefs and 1 associate).
- Three justices have been appointed from South Carolina (1 chief, 1 chief who was earlier an associate, and 1 associate).
- Three associate justices have been appointed from Alabama.
- Two associate justices have been appointed from Colorado, including current associate justice Neil Gorsuch.
- Two associate justices have been appointed from Iowa, Indiana, Michigan, Minnesota, North Carolina, and New Hampshire.
- One associate justice has been appointed from Arizona, while another associate justice who later became chief was born there had moved to Virginia prior to their appointment.
- One justice, who served both as an associate and as chief, has been appointed from Louisiana; current associate justice Amy Coney Barrett was born and raised there, but had moved to Indiana prior to her appointment.
- One associate justice has been appointed from Kansas, Maine, Missouri, Mississippi, Texas, Utah, and Wyoming.

=== States from which no justices have been appointed ===
Despite the efforts to achieve geographic balance, only seven justices (Note: David J. Brewer from Kansas; Byron White and Neil Gorsuch from Colorado; Willis Van Devanter from Wyoming; George Sutherland from Utah and Sandra Day O'Connor and William Rehnquist from Arizona) have ever hailed from states admitted after or during the Civil War. Nineteen states have never produced a Supreme Court justice. In order of admission to the Union these are:

1. Delaware (original state)
2. Rhode Island (original state)
3. Vermont (admitted in 1791)
4. Arkansas (admitted in 1836) (Note: President Nixon reportedly intended to nominate Herschel Friday of Arkansas to a seat on the court in 1971, but changed his mind hours before announcing a different nominee.)
5. Florida (admitted in 1845) (Note: An unsuccessful nominee, G. Harrold Carswell, was from Florida. A successful nominee, Ketanji Brown Jackson, was born in Washington, D.C., and appointed from there, but spent most of her childhood in Florida.)
6. Wisconsin (admitted in 1848) (Note: President George W. Bush considered appointing Diane S. Sykes, a Federal judge from Wisconsin, to the Supreme Court in 2005.)
7. Oregon (admitted in 1859) (Note: An unsuccessful nominee, George Henry Williams, was from Oregon.)
8. West Virginia (admitted in 1863) (Note: West Virginia could be argued to have produced no Supreme Court justices back to the inaugural Court – it was part of Virginia between 1788 and 1863, and none of Virginia's five antebellum Supreme Court justices hailed from what became West Virginia.)
9. Nevada (admitted in 1864)
10. Nebraska (admitted in 1867)
11. North Dakota (admitted in 1889)
12. South Dakota (admitted in 1889)
13. Montana (admitted in 1889) (Note: Barack Obama considered appointing Sidney R. Thomas, a Federal judge from Montana, to the Supreme Court in 2010)
14. Washington (state) (admitted in 1889)
15. Idaho (admitted in 1890)
16. Oklahoma (admitted in 1907)
17. New Mexico (admitted in 1912)
18. Alaska (admitted in 1959)
19. Hawaii (admitted in 1959)

=== Foreign birth ===
Six justices were born outside the United States. These included James Wilson (1789–1798), born in Ceres, Fife, Scotland; James Iredell (1790–1799), born in Lewes, England; and William Paterson (1793–1806), born in County Antrim, then in the Kingdom of Ireland. Justice David J. Brewer (1889–1910) was born farthest from the U.S., in Smyrna, in the Ottoman Empire, (now İzmir, Turkey), where his parents were American missionaries at the time. George Sutherland (1922–1939) was born in Buckinghamshire, England. The last foreign-born justice, and the only one of these for whom English was a second language, was Felix Frankfurter (1939–1962), born in Vienna, Austria-Hungary (now in Austria).

The Constitution imposes no citizenship requirement on federal judges, however Federal appropriation law does require that anyone serving on the Federal judiciary be a U.S. citizen, or a lawful permanent resident who has immediately sought to acquire citizenship.

== Ethnicity ==
All Supreme Court justices were white and of mostly Northwestern European heritage until the appointment of Thurgood Marshall, the first African-American Justice, in 1967. Since then, only three other non-white justices have been appointed: Marshall's African-American successor, Clarence Thomas, in 1991, Latina Justice Sonia Sotomayor in 2009, and African-American Ketanji Brown Jackson in 2022.

Non-white justices
Name	Appointed from	Birth	Death	Year appointed	Left office	Appointed by	Reason for departure
Thurgood Marshall	Maryland	1908	1993	1967	1991	Johnson	retirement
Clarence Thomas	Georgia	1948	living	1991	incumbent	G. H. W. Bush	—
Sonia Sotomayor	New York	1954	living	2009	incumbent	Obama	—
Ketanji Brown Jackson	Washington, D.C.	1970	living	2022	incumbent	Biden	—

Graphical timeline of non-white justices:

=== White justices ===
The majority of white justices have been Protestants of British, Northwestern European, or Germanic descent. There have been several justices of Irish or Ulster Scots descent, with William Paterson born in Ireland to an Ulster Scots Protestant family and Joseph McKenna, Edward Douglas White, Pierce Butler, Frank Murphy, William J. Brennan Jr., Anthony Kennedy, and Brett Kavanaugh being of Irish Catholic origin. There have been five justices of French ancestry in John Jay, Gabriel Duval, Lucius Quintus Cincinnatus Lamar, Joseph Rucker Lamar and Amy Coney Barrett, with all except the Catholic Barrett being Protestants of Huguenot origins. Many justices – including John Jay, William Johnson, and Willis Van Devanter – have been of Dutch Protestant origin, while two Protestant Scandinavian Americans to serve on the court have been Chief Justices Earl Warren and William Rehnquist.

Up until the 1980s, only eight justices of "central, eastern, or southern European derivation" had been appointed, and even among these justices, five of them "were of Germanic background, which includes Austrian, German-Bohemian, and Swiss origins (John Catron, Samuel F. Miller, Louis Brandeis, Felix Frankfurter, and Warren Burger)", with Brandeis and Frankfurter being of Ashkenazi Jewish descent, while only one justice was of non-Germanic, Southern European descent (Benjamin N. Cardozo, of Sephardic Jewish descent). Cardozo, appointed to the court in 1932, was the first justice who did not have a Northwestern European background. Both of Justice Cardozo's parents descended from Sephardic Jews from the Iberian Peninsula who fled to Holland during the Spanish Inquisition, then to London, before arriving in New York prior to the American Revolution. At least two, Abe Fortas and Arthur Goldberg, were of Eastern European Ashkenazi descent.

Justice Antonin Scalia, who served from 1986 to 2016, and Justice Samuel Alito, who has served since 2006, are the first justices of Italian descent to be appointed to the Supreme Court. Justice Scalia's father and both maternal grandparents as well as both of Justice Alito's parents were born in Italy. Justice Ruth Bader Ginsburg was born to a Jewish father who immigrated from Russia at age 13 and a Jewish mother who was born four months after her parents immigrated from Poland.

Among white ethnicities, according to 1959 and 1979 articles by Schmidhauser, there had never been a Justice with any Slavic ancestry. That changed in 2005 with the appointment of John Roberts, whose mother was of Slovak ancestry.

=== African-American justices ===
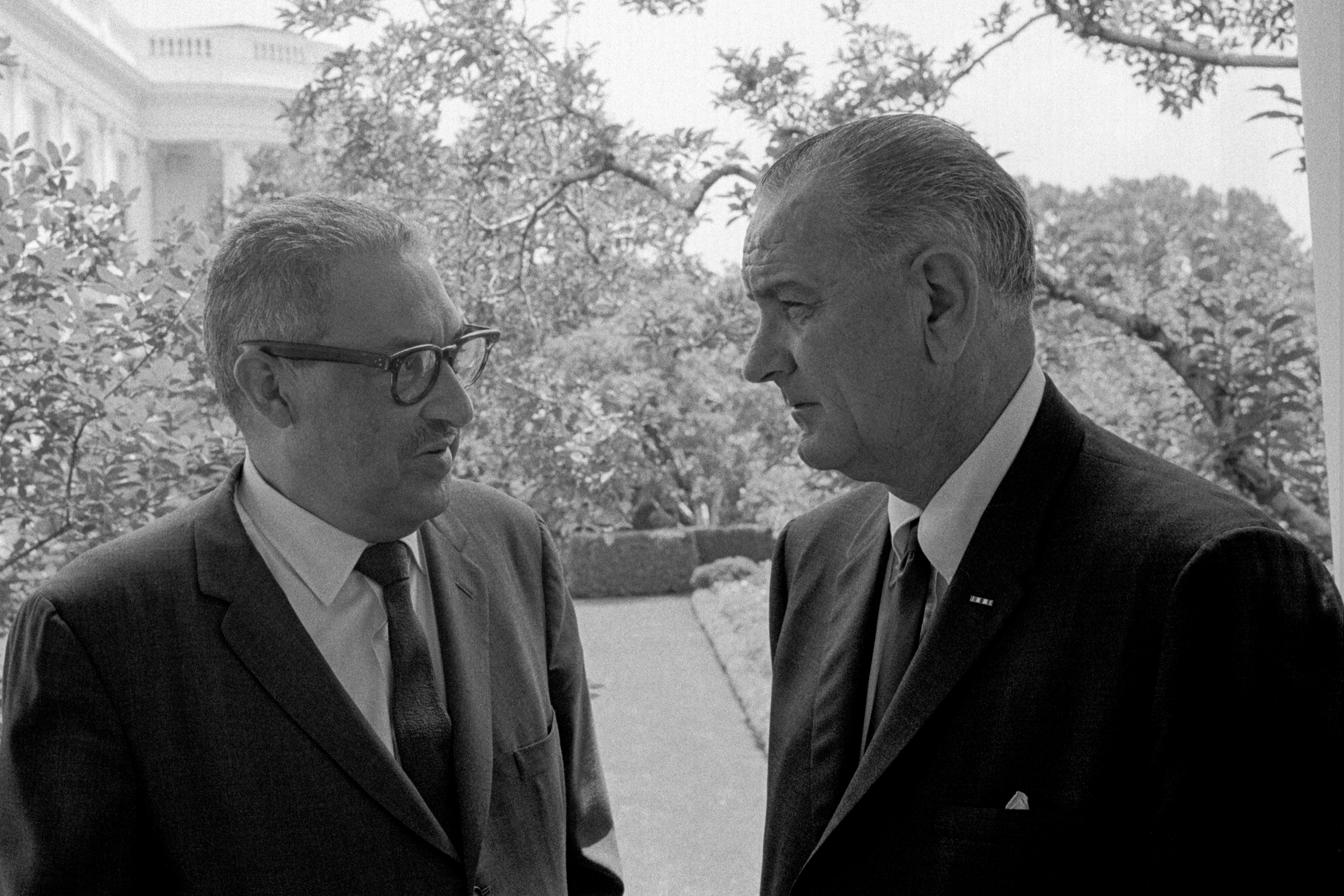
Thurgood Marshall, the first African-American Justice, speaking with his appointing President, Lyndon B. Johnson

No African-American candidate was given serious consideration for appointment to the Supreme Court until the election of John F. Kennedy, who weighed the possibility of appointing William H. Hastie of the United States Court of Appeals for the Third Circuit. Hastie had been the first African-American elevated to a Court of Appeals when Harry S. Truman had so appointed him in 1949, and by the time of the Kennedy Administration, it was widely anticipated that Hastie might be appointed to the Supreme Court. Kennedy gave serious consideration to this appointment, ensuring that this "represented the first time in American history that an African American was an actual contender for the high court".

The first African-American appointed to the court was Thurgood Marshall, appointed by Lyndon B. Johnson in 1967. Johnson appointed Marshall to the Supreme Court following the retirement of Justice Tom C. Clark, saying that this was "the right thing to do, the right time to do it, the right man and the right place." Marshall was confirmed as an Associate Justice by a Senate vote of 69–11 on August 31, 1967. Johnson confidently predicted to one biographer, Doris Kearns Goodwin, that a lot of black baby boys would be named "Thurgood" in honor of this choice (in fact, Kearns's research of birth records in New York and Boston indicates that Johnson's prophecy did not come true). (Note: According to the Social Security Administration Popular baby name database, Thurgood has never been in the top 1,000 of male baby names.)

The second was Clarence Thomas, appointed by George H. W. Bush to succeed Marshall in 1991. Bush initially wanted to nominate Thomas to replace William Brennan, who stepped down in 1990, but Bush decided that Thomas had not yet had enough experience as a judge after only months on the federal bench. Bush nominated New Hampshire Supreme Court judge David Souter (who was of Scottish ancestry) instead. When Marshall retired for health reasons in 1991, Bush nominated a new African American justice: Clarence Thomas.

In 1981, President Ronald Reagan considered nominating Judge Amalya Kearse of the Second Circuit Court of Appeals to the Supreme Court, but chose Sandra Day O'Connor instead.

On February 25, 2022, President Joe Biden announced the nomination of Ketanji Brown Jackson to a seat vacated by the retirement of Stephen Breyer, making Jackson the first African-American woman to be nominated to the court. The Senate confirmed Jackson on April 7, 2022, and she joined the court two months later.

=== Hispanic and Latino justices ===
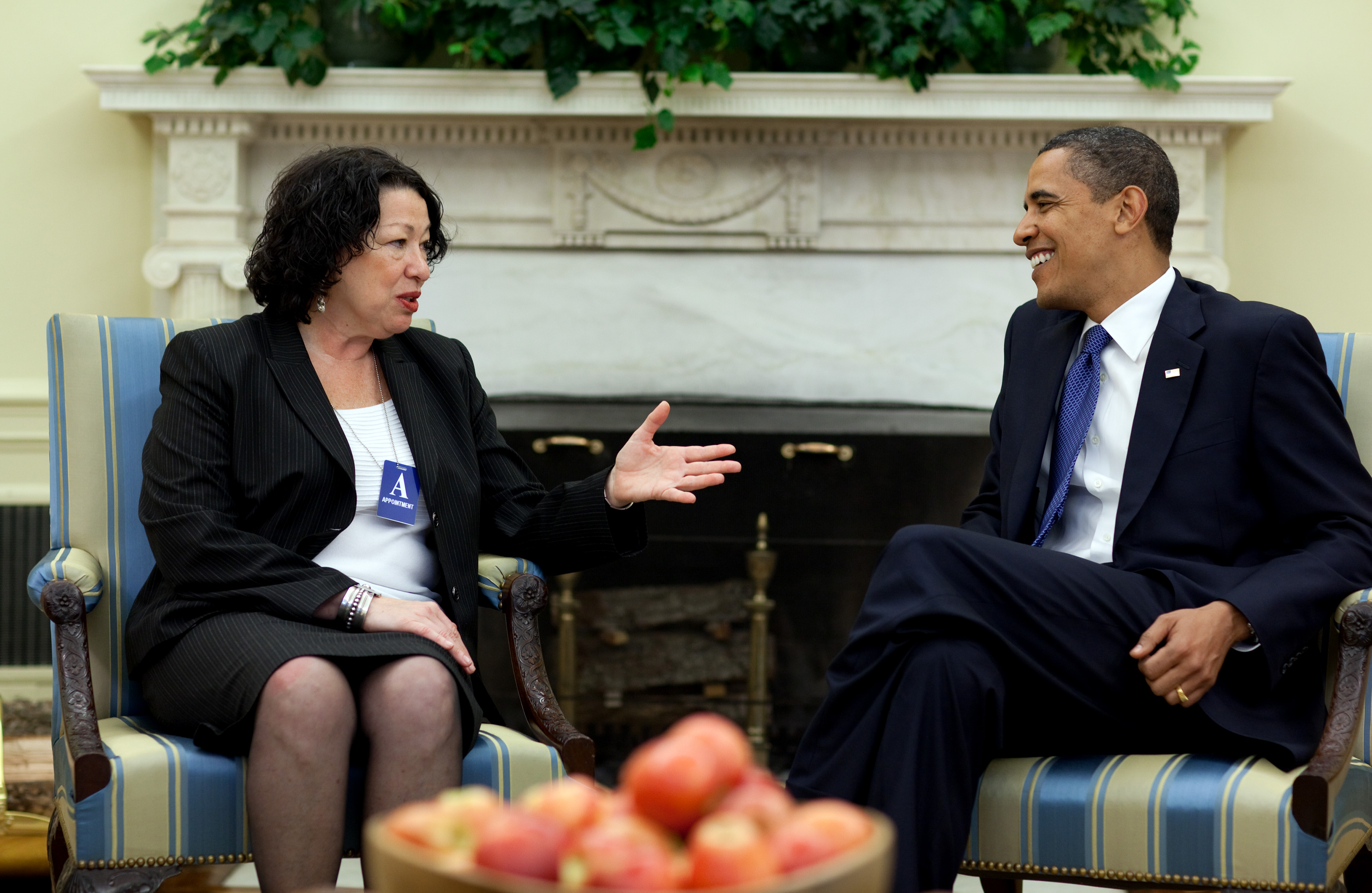
Sonia Sotomayor, the first Hispanic justice, with appointing President Barack Obama

The words "Latino" and "Hispanic" are sometimes given distinct meanings, with "Latino" referring to persons of Latin American descent, and "Hispanic" referring to persons having an ancestry, language or culture traceable to Spain or to the Iberian Peninsula as a whole.

Sonia Sotomayor – nominated by President Barack Obama on May 26, 2009, and sworn in on August 8 – is the first Supreme Court Justice of Latin American descent. Born in New York City of Puerto Rican parents, she has been known to refer to herself as a "Nuyorican". Sotomayor is also generally regarded as the first Hispanic justice. However, some sources claim that this distinction belongs to former Justice Benjamin N. Cardozo, whose paternal grandfather was of Portuguese ancestry.

It has been claimed that "only since the George H. W. Bush administration have Hispanic candidates received serious consideration from presidents in the selection process", and that Emilio M. Garza (considered for the vacancy eventually given to Clarence Thomas) was the first Hispanic judge for whom such an appointment was contemplated. Subsequently, Bill Clinton was reported by several sources to have considered José A. Cabranes for a Supreme Court nomination on both occasions when a court vacancy opened during the Clinton presidency. The possibility of an Hispanic justice returned during the George W. Bush Presidency, with various reports suggesting that Emilio M. Garza, Alberto Gonzales, and Consuelo M. Callahan were under consideration for the vacancy left by the retirement of Sandra Day O'Connor. O'Connor's seat eventually went to Samuel Alito, however. Speculation about a Hispanic nomination arose again after the election of Barack Obama. In 2009, Obama appointed Sonia Sotomayor, a woman of Puerto Rican descent, to be the first unequivocally Hispanic Justice. Both the National Association of Latino Elected and Appointed Officials and the Hispanic National Bar Association count Sotomayor as the first Hispanic justice. In 2020, President Trump included Cuban-American judge Barbara Lagoa on a list of potential nominees to the court, and Lagoa was reported to be one of several front-runners to fill the vacancy created by the death of Ruth Bader Ginsburg. Ultimately, Amy Coney Barrett was nominated.

Some historians contend that Cardozo – a Sephardic Jew whose grandfather is believed to be of distant Portuguese descent – should also be counted as the first Hispanic Justice. Schmidhauser wrote in 1979 that "among the large ethnic groupings of European origin which have never been represented upon the Supreme Court are the Italians, Southern Slavs, and Hispanic Americans." The National Hispanic Center for Advanced Studies and Policy Analysis wrote in 1982 that the Supreme Court "has never had an Hispanic Justice", and the Hispanic American Almanac similarly reported in 1996 that "no Hispanic has yet sat on the U.S. Supreme Court". However, Segal and Spaeth state: "Though it is often claimed that no Hispanics have served on the Court, it is not clear why Benjamin Cardozo, a Sephardic Jew of Spanish heritage, should not count." They identify a number of other sources that present conflicting views as to Cardozo's ethnicity, with one simply labeling him "Iberian." In 2007, the Dictionary of Latino Civil Rights History also listed Cardozo as "the first Hispanic named to the Supreme Court of the United States."

The nomination of Sonia Sotomayor, widely described in media accounts as the first Hispanic nominee, drew more attention to the question of Cardozo's ethnicity. Cardozo biographer Andrew Kaufman questioned the usage of the term "hispanic" during Cardozo's lifetime, commenting: "Well, I think he regarded himself as Sephardic Jew whose ancestors came from the Iberian Peninsula." However, "no one has ever firmly established that the family's roots were, in fact, in Portugal". It has also been asserted that Cardozo himself "confessed in 1937 that his family preserved neither the Spanish language nor Iberian cultural traditions". By contrast, Cardozo made his own translations of authoritative legal works written in French and German.

=== Asian and other ethnic groups ===
Asian-American jurists are poorly represented in the federal judicial system, and there has never been a Supreme Court justice of Asian background. According to a 2019 report of the Center for American Progress, among active federal judges serving on U.S. courts of appeals, 10 were Asian-Americans, equal to the proportion as in the overall U.S. population (5.7 percent). A 2017 study by California Justice Goodwin Liu found that of the 94 U.S. attorneys, only three were Asian American; and only 4 of the 2,437 elected prosecutors were Asian American. In 2016, President Barack Obama considered Judge Sri Srinivasan as a potential nominee to the Supreme Court of the United States after the death of Antonin Scalia; Obama nominated Merrick Garland instead. President Trump included Indian-American judge Amul Thapar on a list of potential nominees to the court, and Thapar was reported to be one of several front-runners to fill the vacancy created by the retirement of Anthony Kennedy. Ultimately, Brett Kavanaugh was nominated.

=== Public opinion on ethnic diversity ===
Public opinion about ethnic diversity on the court "varies widely depending on the poll question's wording". For example, in two polls taken in 1991, one resulted in half of respondents agreeing that it was "important that there always be at least one black person" on the court while the other had only 20 percent agreeing with that sentiment, and with 77 percent agreeing that "race should never be a factor in choosing Supreme Court justices".

== Gender ==
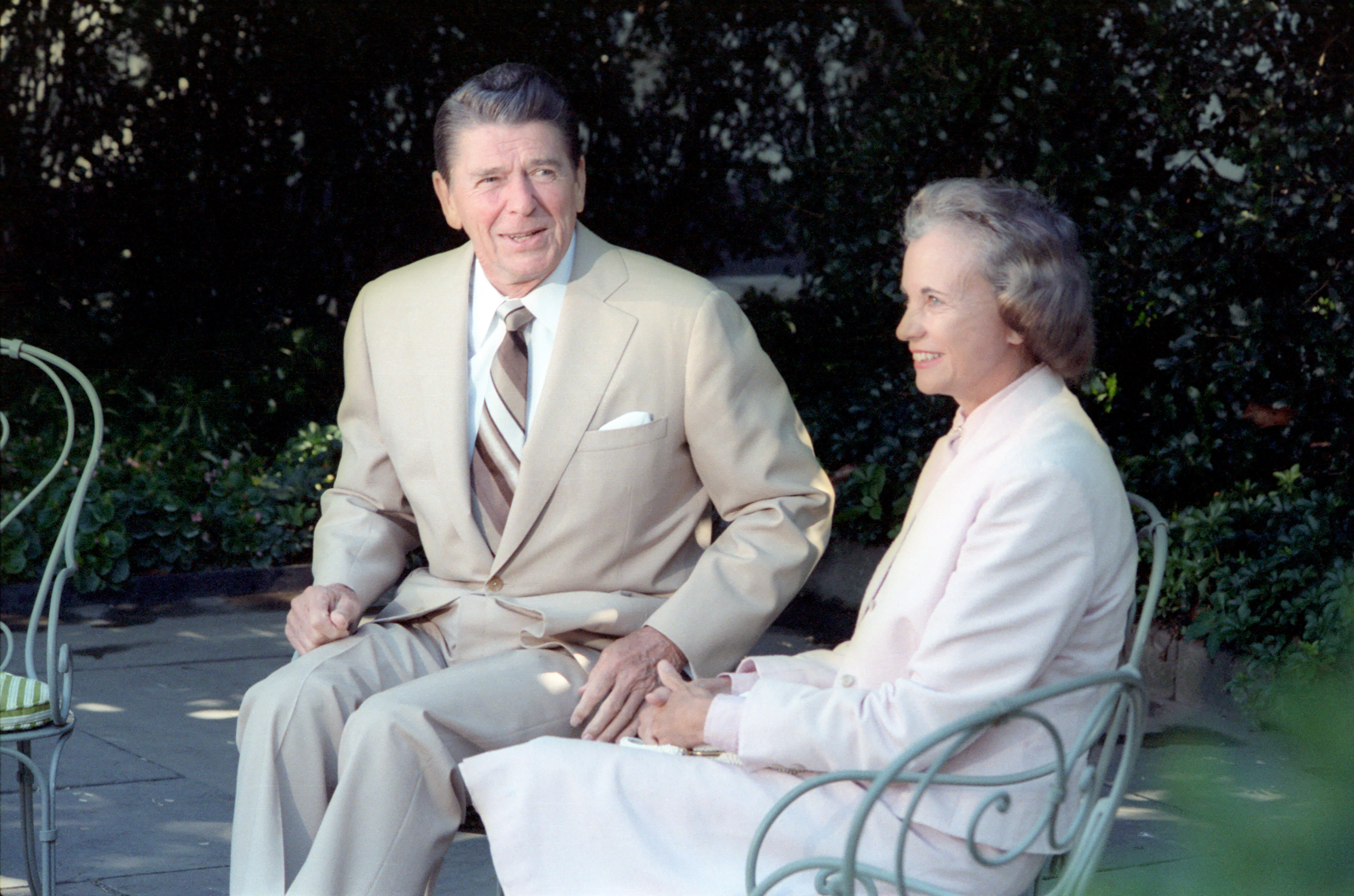
Sandra Day O'Connor, the first female justice, with President Ronald Reagan, who appointed her

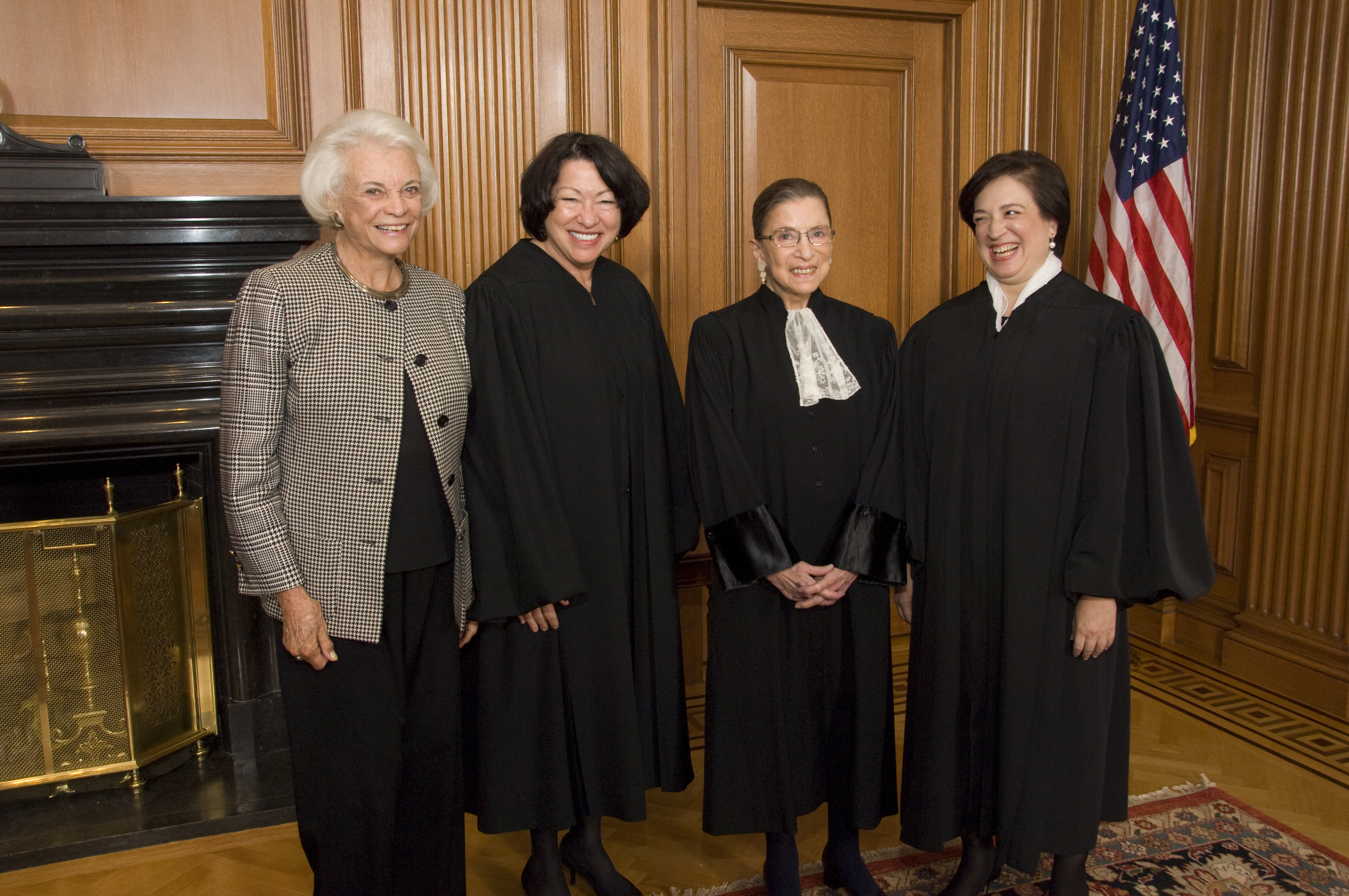
The first four women who served on the court. From left to right: Justices Sandra Day O'Connor (ret.), Sonia Sotomayor, Ruth Bader Ginsburg, and Elena Kagan. October 1, 2010, prior to Justice Kagan's investiture ceremony.

Of the 116 justices, 110 (94.8 percent) have been men. All Supreme Court justices were males until 1981, when Ronald Reagan fulfilled his 1980 campaign promise to place a woman on the court, which he did with the appointment of Sandra Day O'Connor. O'Connor was later joined on the court by Ruth Bader Ginsburg, appointed by Bill Clinton in 1993. After O'Connor retired in 2006, Ginsburg was joined by Sonia Sotomayor and Elena Kagan, who were successfully appointed to the court in 2009 and 2010, respectively, by Barack Obama. In September 2020, following Ginsburg's death, Donald Trump nominated Amy Coney Barrett to succeed her. Barrett was confirmed the following month. Only one woman, Harriet Miers, has been nominated to the court unsuccessfully. Her 2005 nomination to succeed O'Connor by George W. Bush was withdrawn under fire from both parties, and also marked the first time when a woman was nominated to replace another woman on the court. The nomination of Barrett was the first successful nomination for a woman to succeed another woman. Joe Biden's 2022 nomination of Ketanji Brown Jackson to a seat vacated by the retirement of Stephen Breyer makes Jackson the first African-American woman to be nominated to the court. The Senate confirmed Jackson on April 7, 2022, and she joined the court two months later.

Substantial public sentiment in support of appointment of a woman to the Supreme Court has been expressed since at least as early as 1930, when an editorial in The Christian Science Monitor encouraged Herbert Hoover to consider Ohio Supreme Court Justice Florence E. Allen or assistant attorney general Mabel Walker Willebrandt. Franklin Delano Roosevelt appointed Allen to the United States Court of Appeals for the Sixth Circuit in 1934—making her "one of the highest ranking female jurists in the world at that time". However, neither Roosevelt nor his successors over the following two decades gave strong consideration to female candidates for the court. Harry Truman briefly considered appointing Allen to the Supreme Court, but was dissuaded by concerns raised by justices then serving that a woman on the court "would inhibit their conference deliberations", which were marked by informality.

President Richard Nixon named Mildred Lillie, then serving as a judge on the California Second District Court of Appeals, as a potential nominee to fill one of two vacancies on the court in 1971. However, Lillie was quickly deemed unqualified by the American Bar Association, and no formal proceedings were ever set with respect to her potential nomination. Lewis Powell and William Rehnquist were then successfully nominated to fill those vacancies.

President Jimmy Carter seriously considered nominating former Judge Shirley Hufstedler of the Ninth Circuit Court of Appeals to the Supreme Court, but no vacancy occurred during his Presidency.

In 1991, a poll found that 53 percent of Americans felt it "important that there always be at least one woman" on the court. However, when O'Connor stepped down from the court, leaving Justice Ginsburg as the lone remaining woman, only one in seven persons polled found it "essential that a woman be nominated to replace" O'Connor.

Women on the Supreme Court
Name	Appointed from	Birth	Death	Year appointed	Left office	Appointed by	Reason for departure
Sandra Day O'Connor	Arizona	1930	2023	1981	2006	Reagan	retirement
Ruth Bader Ginsburg	New York	1933	2020	1993	2020	Clinton	death
Sonia Sotomayor	New York	1954	living	2009	incumbent	Obama	—
Elena Kagan	New York	1960	living	2010	incumbent	Obama	—
Amy Coney Barrett	Indiana	1972	living	2020	incumbent	Trump	—
Ketanji Brown Jackson	Washington, D.C.	1970	living	2022	incumbent	Biden	—

Graphical timeline of female justices:

== Marital status and sexual orientation ==
=== Marital status ===
All but a handful of Supreme Court justices have been married. William H. Moody, Frank Murphy, Benjamin Cardozo, James Clark McReynolds, and David Souter were all lifelong bachelors. In addition, current justice Elena Kagan has never been married. William O. Douglas was the first Justice to divorce while on the court and also had the most marriages of any Justice, with four. Justice John Paul Stevens divorced his first wife in 1979, marrying his second wife later that year. Sonia Sotomayor was the first female justice to be appointed as an unmarried woman, having divorced in 1983, long before her nomination in 2009. Of the six women who have been appointed to the Court, O'Connor and Ginsburg were the only two military spouses.

Several justices have become widowers while on the bench. The 1792 death of Elizabeth Rutledge, wife of Justice John Rutledge, contributed to the mental health problems that led to the rejection of his recess appointment. Roger B. Taney survived his wife, Anne, by twenty years. Oliver Wendell Holmes Jr. resolutely continued working on the court for several years after the death of his wife. William Rehnquist was a widower for the last fourteen years of his service on the court, his wife Natalie having died on October 17, 1991, after suffering from ovarian cancer. With the death of Martin D. Ginsburg in June 2010, Ruth Bader Ginsburg became the first woman to be widowed while serving on the court.

=== Sexual orientation ===
With regards to sexual orientation, there is no conclusive evidence that there has ever been an LGBT Supreme Court justice.

G. Harrold Carswell was unsuccessfully nominated by Richard Nixon in 1970 and was convicted in 1976 of battery for making an "unnatural and lascivious" advance to a male police officer working undercover in a Florida men's room. Some therefore claim him as the only gay or bisexual person nominated to the court thus far. If so, it is unlikely that Nixon was aware of it; White House Counsel John Dean later wrote of Carswell that "[w]hile Richard Nixon was always looking for historical firsts, nominating a homosexual to the high court would not have been on his list".

Speculation has been recorded about the sexual orientation of a few justices who were lifelong bachelors, but no unambiguous evidence exists that they were gay. Perhaps the greatest body of circumstantial evidence surrounds Frank Murphy, who was dogged by "rumors of homosexuality ... all his adult life".

For more than 40 years, Edward G. Kemp was Frank Murphy's devoted, trusted companion. Like Murphy, Kemp was a lifelong bachelor. From college until Murphy's death, the pair found creative ways to work and live together. [...] When Murphy appeared to have the better future in politics, Kemp stepped into a supportive, secondary role.

As well as Murphy's close relationship with Kemp, Murphy's biographer, historian Sidney Fine, found in Murphy's personal papers a letter that "if the words mean what they say, refers to a homosexual encounter some years earlier between Murphy and the writer." However, the letter's veracity cannot be confirmed, and a review of all the evidence led Fine to conclude that he "could not stick his neck out and say [Murphy] was gay".

Speculation has also surrounded Benjamin Cardozo, whose celibacy was proposed to suggest repressed homosexuality or asexuality. The fact that he was unmarried and was personally tutored by the writer Horatio Alger (alleged to have had sexual relations with boys) led some of Cardozo's biographers to insinuate that Cardozo was homosexual, but no real evidence exists to corroborate this possibility. Constitutional law scholar Jeffrey Rosen noted in a The New York Times Book Review of Richard Polenberg's book on Cardozo:

Polenberg describes Cardozo's lifelong devotion to his older sister Nell, with whom he lived in New York until her death in 1929. When asked why he had never married, Cardozo replied, quietly and sadly, "I never could give Nellie the second place in my life." Polenberg suggests that friends may have stressed Cardozo's devotion to his sister to discourage rumors "that he was sexually dysfunctional, or had an unusually low sexual drive or was homosexual." But he produces no evidence to support any of these possibilities, except to note that friends, in describing Cardozo, used words like "beautiful", "exquisite", "sensitive" or "delicate."

Andrew Kaufman, author of Cardozo, a biography published in 2000, notes that "Although one cannot be absolutely certain, it seems highly likely that Cardozo lived a celibate life". Judge Learned Hand is quoted in the book as saying about Cardozo: "He [had] no trace of homosexuality anyway".

More recently, when David Souter was nominated to the court, "conservative groups expressed concern to the White House ... that the president's bachelor nominee might conceivably be a homosexual". Similar questions were raised regarding the sexual orientation of unmarried nominee Elena Kagan. However, no evidence was ever produced regarding Souter's sexual orientation, and Kagan's apparent heterosexuality was attested by colleagues familiar with her dating history.

== Religion ==
When the Supreme Court was established in 1789, the first members came from among the ranks of the Founding Fathers and were almost uniformly Protestant. Of the 116 justices who have been appointed to the court, 92 have been from various Protestant denominations and 15 have been Catholics (one other justice, Sherman Minton, began practicing Catholicism after leaving the court). Another, Neil Gorsuch, was raised in the Catholic Church but later attended an Episcopal church, though without specifying the denomination to which he felt he belonged. Eight justices have been Jewish and one, David Davis, had no known religious affiliation. Three of the 17 chief justices have been Catholics, and one Jewish justice, Abe Fortas, was nominated to be chief justice, though this nomination was withdrawn in the face of a filibuster.

The table below shows the religious affiliation of each of the justices sitting as of July 2022:

Religious makeup of the current court
Name	Religion	Appt. by	On the court since
John Roberts (Chief Justice)	Catholicism	G. W. Bush	2005
Clarence Thomas	Catholicism	G. H. W. Bush	1991
Samuel Alito	Catholicism	G. W. Bush	2006
Sonia Sotomayor	Catholicism	Obama	2009
Elena Kagan	Judaism	Obama	2010
Neil Gorsuch	Anglicanism/Catholicism	Trump	2017
Brett Kavanaugh	Catholicism	Trump	2018
Amy Coney Barrett	Catholicism	Trump	2020
Ketanji Brown Jackson	Protestantism	Biden	2022

=== Protestant justices ===
Most Supreme Court justices have been Protestant Christians. These have included 33 Episcopalians, 18 Presbyterians, nine Unitarians, five Methodists, three Baptists, two Disciples of Christ, and lone representatives of various other denominations. William Rehnquist and William R. Day were the court's only Lutherans. Noah Swayne was a Quaker. Some fifteen Protestant justices did not adhere to a particular denomination. The religious beliefs of James Wilson, one of the earliest justices, have been the subject of some dispute, as there are writings from various points of his life from which it can be argued that he leaned towards Presbyterianism, Anglicanism, Thomism, or Deism; it has been deemed likely that he eventually favored some form of Christianity. Baptist denominations and other evangelical churches have been underrepresented on the court relative to the population of the United States, and entirely unrepresented since the retirement of Methodist Harry Blackmun in 1994. Conversely, mainline Protestant churches historically were overrepresented.

Following the retirement of John Paul Stevens in June 2010, the court had an entirely non-Protestant composition for the first time in its history. Neil Gorsuch was the first member of a mainline Protestant denomination to sit on the court since Stevens' retirement. (Note: Although Neil Gorsuch, appointed in 2017, attends and is a member of an Episcopal church, he was raised Catholic and some of his acquaintances were unsure if he considered himself a Catholic who is also a member of a Protestant church, or simply a Protestant. However, at his 2017 confirmation hearing, when asked a question about his faith, Gorsuch responded, "I attend an Episcopal church in Boulder with my family, Senator." Prior to his appointment he was an active member of Holy Comforter Episcopal Church and then St. John's Episcopal Church in Boulder, Colorado.) Ketanji Brown Jackson is a non-denominational Protestant.

=== Catholic justices ===
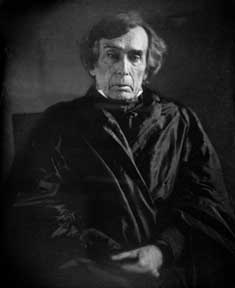
Roger B. Taney, the first Catholic justice

The first Catholic justice, Roger B. Taney, was appointed chief justice in 1836 by Andrew Jackson. The second, Edward Douglass White, was appointed as an associate justice in 1894, but also went on to become chief justice. Joseph McKenna was appointed in 1898, placing two Catholics on the court until White's death in 1921. This period marked the beginning of an inconsistently observed "tradition" of having a "Catholic seat" on the court.

Other Catholic justices included Pierce Butler (appointed 1923) and Frank Murphy (appointed 1940). Justice James F. Byrnes was a lapsed Catholic. Sherman Minton, appointed in 1949, was a Protestant during his time on the court. To some, however, his wife's Catholic faith implied a "Catholic seat". Minton joined his wife's church in 1961, five years after he retired from the court. Minton was succeeded by a Catholic, however, when President Eisenhower appointed William J. Brennan to that seat. Eisenhower sought a Catholic to appoint to the court—in part because there had been no Catholic justice since Murphy's death in 1949, and in part because Eisenhower was directly lobbied by Francis Cardinal Spellman of the Archdiocese of New York to make such an appointment. Brennan was then the lone Catholic justice in 1985, but by the 21st century there would be six Catholic justices on the court.

Like Sherman Minton, Clarence Thomas was not a Catholic at the time he was appointed to the court. Thomas was raised Catholic and briefly attended Conception Seminary College, a Catholic seminary, but had joined the Protestant denomination of his wife after their marriage. At some point in the late 1990s, Thomas returned to Catholicism. In 2005, John Roberts became the third Catholic Chief Justice and the fourth Catholic on the court. Shortly thereafter, Samuel Alito became the fifth on the court, and the eleventh in the history of the court. Alito's appointment gave the court a Catholic majority for the first time in its history.

In contrast to historical patterns, the court has gone from having a "Catholic seat" to being what some have characterized as a "Catholic court". The reasons for that are subject to debate. The fact that most recent Catholic appointees were also ideologically conservative has led some partisan critics to derisively refer to the court as "a Catholic boys club". However in May 2009, President Barack Obama nominated a Catholic woman, Sonia Sotomayor, to replace retiring Justice David Souter. Her confirmation raised the number of Catholics on the court to six, compared to three non-Catholics. With Antonin Scalia's death in February 2016, the number of Catholic justices went back to five. Scalia's replacement, Neil Gorsuch, appointed in 2017, was raised Catholic but attends and is a member of an Episcopal church; it is unclear if he identifies as a Catholic as well as belonging to the Episcopal Church. Following Anthony Kennedy's retirement in July 2018, the number of Catholic justices remained unchanged as he was succeeded by Catholic Brett Kavanaugh. In September 2020, following the death of Ruth Bader Ginsburg, Donald Trump nominated another Catholic, Amy Coney Barrett to succeed her.

Catholic justices
Name	Appointed from	Birth	Death	Year appointed	Left office	Appointed by	Reason for termination
Roger B. Taney	Maryland	1777	1864	1836	1864	Jackson	death
Edward Douglass White	Louisiana	1845	1921	1894	1921	Cleveland (associate); Taft (chief) (Note: This individual was elevated from associate justice to chief justice. Unlike the inferior courts, the chief justice is separately nominated and subject to a separate confirmation process, regardless of whether or not they are already an Associate Justice.)	death
Joseph McKenna	California	1843	1926	1898	1925	McKinley	retirement
Pierce Butler	Minnesota	1866	1939	1923	1939	Harding	death
Frank Murphy	Michigan	1890	1949	1940	1949	F. Roosevelt	death
Sherman Minton	Indiana	1890	1965	1949	1956	Truman	retirement; death (Note: There are two types of retirement. First, a justice can resign an appointment in return for a pension, and the "Reason Appointment Terminated" is marked as "retirement". Alternatively, a justice can retire and assume senior status. The justice's appointment does not end; instead, the justice accepts a reduced workload on an inferior court. For instance, Stanley Forman Reed was frequently assigned to the Court of Claims when he was in senior status. As of 2006, every justice except Charles Evans Whittaker who assumed senior status has died in it; in that case, the judge will have the "Reason Appointment Terminated" as "death", even though the justice retired from the court before they died.)
William J. Brennan Jr.	New Jersey	1906	1997	1956	1990	Eisenhower	retirement; death
Antonin Scalia	New Jersey	1936	2016	1986	2016	Reagan	death
Anthony Kennedy	California	1936	living	1988	2018	Reagan	retirement
Clarence Thomas	Georgia	1948	living	1991	incumbent	G. H. W. Bush	—
John Roberts	Maryland	1955	living	2005	incumbent	G. W. Bush	—
Samuel Alito	New Jersey	1950	living	2006	incumbent	G. W. Bush	—
Sonia Sotomayor	New York	1954	living	2009	incumbent	Obama	—
Brett Kavanaugh	Washington, D.C.	1965	living	2018	incumbent	Trump	—
Amy Coney Barrett	Indiana	1972	living	2020	incumbent	Trump	—

Graphical timeline of Catholic justices:

=== Jewish justices ===
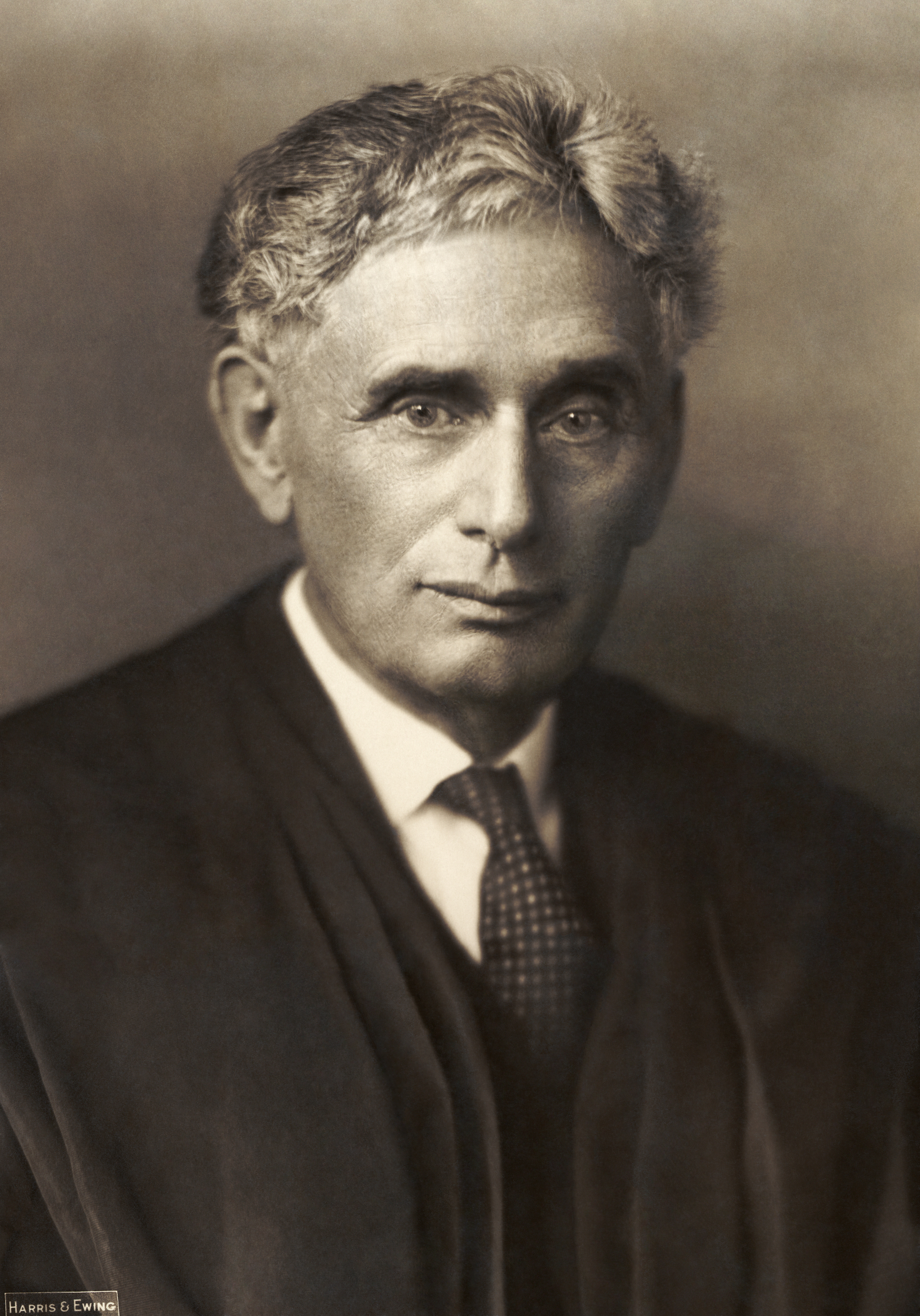
Louis Brandeis, the first Jewish Justice

In 1853, President Millard Fillmore offered to appoint Louisiana Senator Judah P. Benjamin to be the first Jewish justice, and The New York Times reported (on February 15, 1853) that "if the President nominates Benjamin, the Democrats are determined to confirm him". However, Benjamin declined the offer, and ultimately became Secretary of State for the Confederacy during the Civil War. The first Jewish nominee, Louis Brandeis, was appointed in 1916, after a tumultuous hearing process. The 1932 appointment of Benjamin Cardozo raised mild controversy for placing two Jewish justices on the court at the same time, although the appointment was widely lauded based on Cardozo's qualifications, and the Senate was unanimous in confirming Cardozo. Most Jewish Supreme Court justices were of Ashkenazi Jewish descent, with the exception of Cardozo, who was Sephardic. None of the Jewish Supreme Court justices have practiced Orthodox Judaism while on the court, although Abe Fortas was raised Orthodox.

Cardozo was succeeded by another Jewish justice, Felix Frankfurter, but Brandeis was succeeded by Protestant William O. Douglas. Negative reaction to the appointment of the early Jewish justices did not exclusively come from outside the court. Justice James Clark McReynolds, a blatant anti-semite, refused to speak to Brandeis for three years following the latter's appointment and when Brandeis retired in 1939, did not sign the customary dedicatory letter sent to court members on their retirement. During Benjamin Cardozo's swearing in ceremony McReynolds pointedly read a newspaper muttering "another one" and did not attend that of Frankfurter, exclaiming "My God, another Jew on the Court!"

Frankfurter was followed by Arthur Goldberg and Abe Fortas, each of whom filled what became known as the "Jewish seat". After Fortas resigned in 1969, he was replaced by Protestant Harry Blackmun. No Jewish justices were nominated thereafter until Ronald Reagan nominated Douglas H. Ginsburg in 1987, to fill the vacancy created by the retirement of Lewis F. Powell; however, this nomination was withdrawn, and the court remained without any Jewish justices until 1993, when Ruth Bader Ginsburg (unrelated to Douglas Ginsburg) was appointed to replace Byron White. Ginsburg was followed in relatively quick succession by the appointment of Stephen Breyer, also Jewish, in 1994 to replace Blackmun. In 2010, the confirmation of President Barack Obama's nomination of Elena Kagan to the court created the possibility that three Jewish justices would serve simultaneously. Prior to this confirmation, conservative political commentator Pat Buchanan stated that, "If Kagan is confirmed, Jews, who represent less than 2 percent of the U.S. population, will have 33 percent of the Supreme Court seats". At the time of his remarks, 6.4 percent of justices in the history of the court had been Jewish. Justice Ginsburg died in 2020, leaving only two Jews on the Supreme Court: Breyer and Kagan. Breyer announced his retirement in 2022, which left Kagan as the only Jew on the Court.

Jewish justices
Name	Appointed from	Birth	Death	Year appointed	Left office	Appointed by	Reason for departure
Louis Brandeis	Kentucky	1856	1941	1916	1939	Wilson	retirement
Benjamin N. Cardozo	New York	1870	1938	1932	1938	Hoover	death
Felix Frankfurter	New York	1882	1965	1939	1962	F. Roosevelt	retirement
Arthur Goldberg	Illinois	1908	1990	1962	1965	Kennedy	resigned to become UN Ambassador
Abe Fortas	Tennessee	1910	1982	1965	1969	L. B. Johnson	resignation
Ruth Bader Ginsburg	New York	1933	2020	1993	2020	Clinton	death
Stephen Breyer	California	1938	living	1994	2022	Clinton	retirement
Elena Kagan	New York	1960	living	2010	incumbent	Obama	—

Graphical timeline of Jewish justices:

=== The shift to a Catholic majority, and non-Protestant court ===
With Breyer's appointment in 1994, there were two Catholic justices, Antonin Scalia and Anthony Kennedy, and two Jewish justices, Stephen Breyer and Ruth Bader Ginsburg. Clarence Thomas, who had been raised as a Catholic but had attended an Episcopal church after his marriage, returned to Catholicism later in the 1990s. For the first time in the history of the court, Protestants were no longer an absolute majority.

The first Catholic plurality on the court occurred in 2005, when Chief Justice Rehnquist was succeeded in office by Chief Justice John Roberts, who became the fourth sitting Catholic justice. On January 31, 2006, Samuel Alito became the fifth sitting Catholic justice, and on August 6, 2009, Sonia Sotomayor became the sixth. By contrast, there have only been two Catholic U.S. Presidents, John F. Kennedy (unrelated to Justice Kennedy) and Joe Biden. There has never been a Jewish U.S. President.

At the beginning of 2010, Justice John Paul Stevens was the sole remaining Protestant on the court. In April 2010, Justice Stevens announced his retirement, effective as of the court's 2010 summer recess. Upon Justice Stevens' retirement, which formally began on June 28, 2010, the court lacked a Protestant member, marking the first time in its history that it was exclusively composed of Jewish and Catholic justices. Although in January 2017, after seven years with no Protestant justices serving or nominated, President Donald Trump nominated Neil Gorsuch to the court, as noted above it is unclear whether Gorsuch considers himself a Catholic or an Episcopalian. Following the retirement of Justice Kennedy, the Catholic majority on the court was extended by the appointment of Brett Kavanaugh; the appointment of Amy Coney Barrett increased this majority to six Catholic members of the court, or seven if Gorsuch is classified as a Catholic.

This development led to some comment. Law school professor Jeffrey Rosen wrote that "it's a fascinating truth that we've allowed religion to drop out of consideration on the Supreme Court, and right now, we have a Supreme Court that religiously at least, by no means looks like America".

=== Unrepresented religions ===
A number of sizable religious groups, each less than two percent of the total U.S. population, have had no members appointed as justices. These include Orthodox Christians, Mormons, Pentecostals, Muslims, Hindus, Buddhists, Sikhs, and members of Native American religions. George Sutherland has been described as a "lapsed Mormon" because he was raised in the LDS Church, his parents having immigrated to the United States during Sutherland's infancy to join that church. Sutherland's parents soon left the LDS Church and moved to Montana. Sutherland himself also disaffiliated with the faith, but remained in Utah and graduated from Brigham Young Academy in 1881, the only non-Mormon in his class. In 1975, Attorney General Edward H. Levi had listed Dallin H. Oaks, a Mormon who had clerked for Earl Warren and was then president of Brigham Young University, as a potential nominee for Gerald Ford. Ford "crossed Oaks's name off the list early on, noting in the margin that a member of the LDS Church might bring a 'confirmation fight'".

No professing atheist has ever been appointed to the court, although some justices have declined to engage in religious activity, or affiliate with a denomination. As an adult, Benjamin Cardozo no longer practiced his faith and identified himself as an agnostic, though he remained proud of his Jewish heritage.

== Age ==
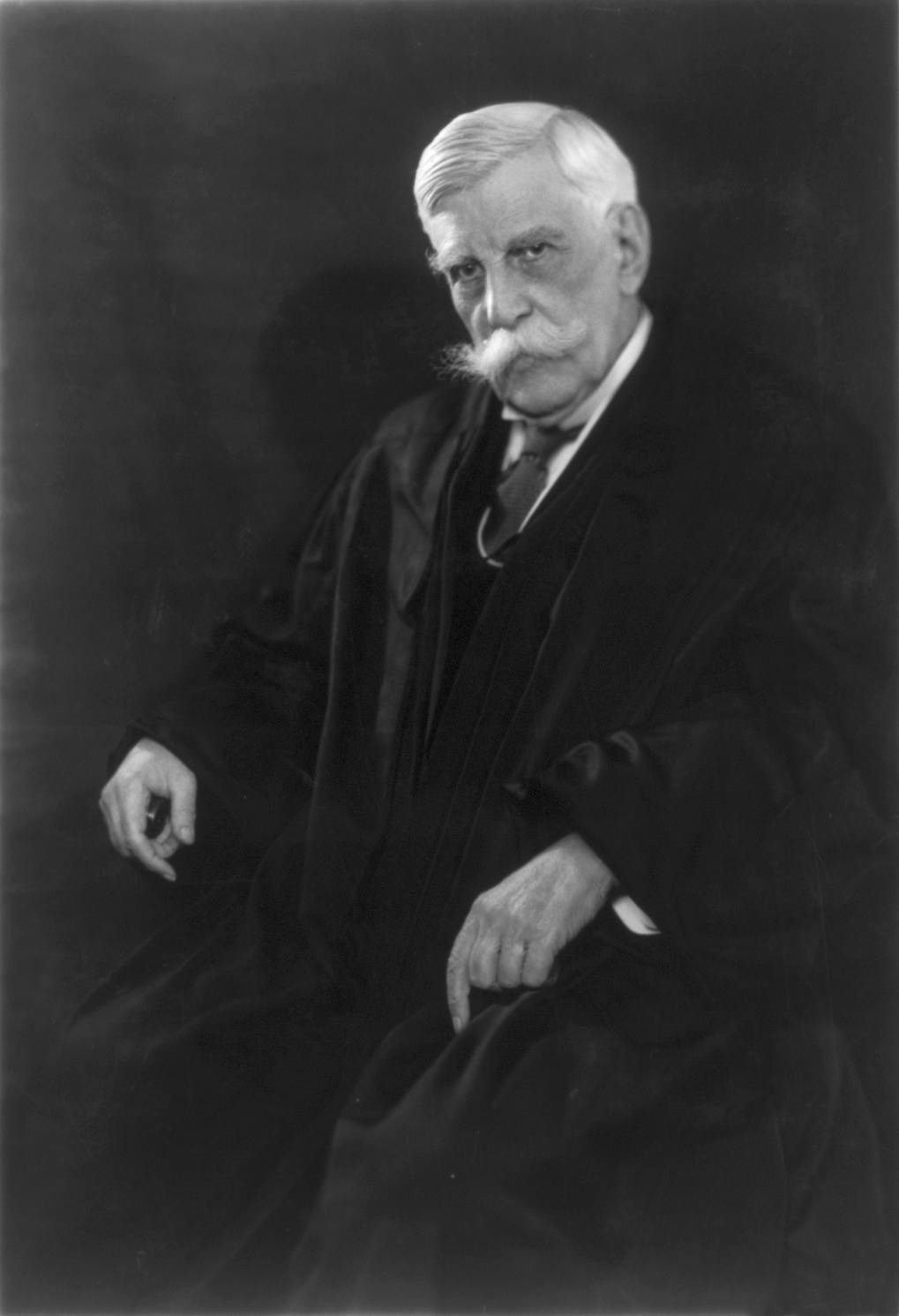
Oliver Wendell Holmes Jr., the oldest justice in history, served on the court until he was 90.

Unlike the offices of President, U.S. Representative, and U.S. Senator, there is no minimum age for Supreme Court justices set forth in the United States Constitution. There are also no term limits, which may lead to Justices spending a very lengthy amount of time on the Court. Appointees who are younger tend to spend more time on the Court.

The youngest justice ever appointed was Joseph Story, 32 at the time of his appointment in 1812; the oldest was Charles Evans Hughes, who was 67 at the time of his appointment as Chief Justice in 1930. (Hughes had previously been appointed to the court as an associate justice in 1910, at the age of 48, but had resigned in 1916 to run for president). Story went on to serve for 33 years, while Hughes served 11 years after his second appointment. The oldest justice at the time of his initial appointment was Horace Lurton, 65 at the time of his appointment in 1909. Lurton died after only four years on the court. The oldest sitting justice to be elevated to Chief Justice was Hughes' successor, Harlan Fiske Stone, who was 68 at the time of his elevation in 1941. Stone died in 1946, only five years after his elevation. The oldest nominee to the court was South Carolina senator William Smith, nominated in 1837, then aged around 75 (it is known that he was born in 1762, but not the exact date). The Senate confirmed Smith's nomination by a vote of 23–18, but Smith declined to serve. Smith died three years later.

Of the justices sitting as of October 21, 2026, Amy Coney Barrett is the youngest, at 54 years, 266 days old, while Clarence Thomas is the oldest at 78 years, 120 days. The oldest person to have served on the court was Oliver Wendell Holmes Jr., who stepped down two months shy of his 91st birthday. John Paul Stevens, second only to Holmes, left the court in June 2010, two months after turning 90.

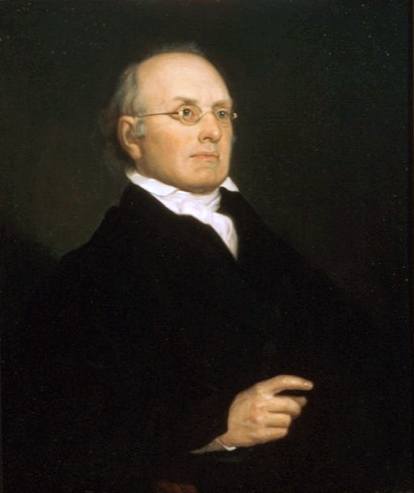
Joseph Story was only 32 when he became a justice of the court.

The average age of the court as a whole fluctuates over time with the departure of older justices and the appointment of younger people to fill their seats. As of 2022, the youngest sitting Justice at the time of appointment is Clarence Thomas, who was 43 years old at the time of his confirmation in 1991. Following the appointment of Ketanji Brown Jackson in 2022, the average age of the court is 66 years, 4 months and 3 days as of October 21, 2026.

As of 2022, the average age of retirement for Supreme Court judges was 81.

The longest period of time in which one group of justices has served together occurred from August 3, 1994, when Stephen Breyer was appointed to replace the retired Harry Blackmun, to September 3, 2005, the death of Rehnquist, totaling 11 years and 31 days. From 1789 until 1970, justices served an average of 14.9 years. Those who have stepped down since 1970 have served an average of 25.6 years. The retirement age had jumped from an average of 68 pre-1970 to 79 for justices retiring post-1970. Between 1789 and 1970 there was a vacancy on the court once every 1.91 years. In the next 34 years since the two appointments in 1971, there was a vacancy on average only once every 3.75 years. The typical one-term president has had one appointment opportunity instead of two.

Commentators have noted that advances in medical knowledge "have enormously increased the life expectancy of a mature person of an age likely to be considered for appointment to the Supreme Court". Combined with the reduction in responsibilities carried out by modern justices as compared to the early justices, this results in much longer potential terms of service. This has led to proposals such as imposing a mandatory retirement age for Supreme Court justices, or predetermined term limits.

== Educational background ==
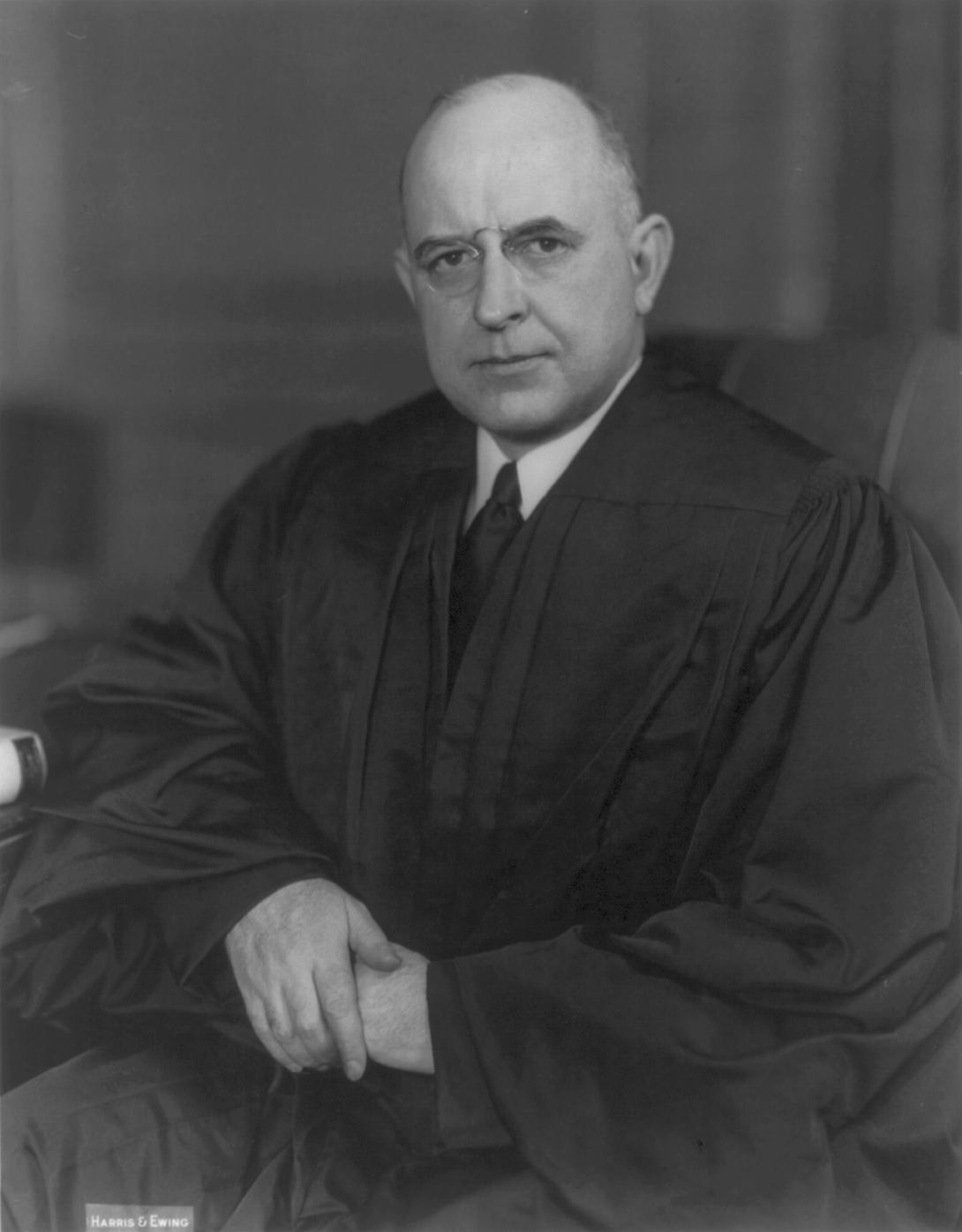
Stanley Forman Reed was the last sitting justice to have not graduated from law school.

Although the Constitution imposes no educational background requirements for federal judges, the work of the court involves complex questions of law—ranging from constitutional law to administrative law to admiralty law—and consequently, a legal education has become a de facto prerequisite to appointment on the Supreme Court. Every person who has been nominated to the court has been an attorney.

Before the advent of modern law schools in the United States, justices, like most attorneys of the time, completed their legal studies by "reading law" (studying under and acting as an apprentice to more experienced attorneys) rather than attending a formal program. The first justice to be appointed who had attended an actual law school was Levi Woodbury, appointed to the court in 1846. Woodbury had attended Tapping Reeve Law School in Litchfield, Connecticut, prior to his admission to the bar in 1812. However, Woodbury did not receive a law degree. Woodbury's successor on the court, Benjamin Robbins Curtis, who graduated from Harvard Law School in 1832, and was appointed to the court in 1851, was the first justice to bear such a credential.

Associate justices James F. Byrnes, whose short tenure lasted from June 1941 to October 1942, and Robert H. Jackson, who served from July 1941 to October 1954, were the last two justices to be appointed without having graduated from law school; Stanley Forman Reed, who served on the court from 1938 to 1957, was the last sitting justice from such a background. In total, of the 115 justices appointed to the court, 49 have graduated from law school, an additional 18 attended some law school but did not graduate, and 47 received their legal education without any law school attendance. Two justices, Sherman Minton and Lewis F. Powell Jr., earned a Master of Laws degree. Of those who attended law school, a substantial proportion attended one of a handful of specific institutions, including Harvard Law School, Yale Law School, and Columbia Law School.

In 1970, G. Harrold Carswell, was nominated as an associate justice of the U.S. Supreme Court – to occupy the seat vacated by Abe Fortas. During the debate of the nomination, Nebraska Republican Roman Hruska intoned in a TV interview, "Even if he [Carswell] were mediocre, there are a lot of mediocre judges and people and lawyers. They are entitled to a little representation, aren't they? We can't have all Brandeises and Frankfurters and Cardozos."

The table below shows the college and law school from which each of the currently sitting justices graduated:

Academic history of the current court
Name	Appt. by	College	Law school
John Roberts (Chief Justice)	G. W. Bush	Harvard	Harvard
Clarence Thomas	G. H. W. Bush	Holy Cross	Yale
Samuel Alito	G. W. Bush	Princeton	Yale
Sonia Sotomayor	Obama	Princeton	Yale
Elena Kagan	Obama	Princeton	Harvard
Neil Gorsuch	Trump	Columbia	Harvard
Brett Kavanaugh	Trump	Yale	Yale
Amy Coney Barrett	Trump	Rhodes	Notre Dame
Ketanji Brown Jackson	Biden	Harvard	Harvard

All Supreme Court justices appointed in the 21st century except Amy Coney Barrett have attended Ivy League universities.

== Professional background ==
Not only have all justices been attorneys, nearly two-thirds had previously been judges. As of 2022, eight of the nine sitting justices previously served as judges of the United States courts of appeals, while Justice Elena Kagan served as Solicitor General, the attorney responsible for representing the federal government in cases before the court. Few justices have a background as criminal defense lawyers, and Thurgood Marshall is reportedly the last justice to have had a client in a death penalty case.

Historically, justices have come from some tradition of public service; only George Shiras Jr. had no such experience. Relatively few justices have been appointed from among members of Congress. Six were members of the United States Senate at the time of their appointment, while one was a sitting member of the House of Representatives. Six more had previously served in the Senate. Three have been sitting governors. Only one, William Howard Taft, had been President of the United States. The last justice to have held elected office was Sandra Day O'Connor, who was elected twice to the Arizona State Senate after being appointed there by the governor. A 2018 article noted that as of that writing, five justices were former law clerks to other justices, the highest number of people with that credential serving at a given time.

Predominantly, recent justices have had experience in the Executive branch. The last Member of Congress to be nominated was Sherman Minton. The last nominee to have any Legislative branch experience was Sandra Day O'Connor.

== Military service ==
As of 2022, 42 justices have been military veterans. Numerous justices were appointed who had served in the American Revolutionary War, the American Civil War (including three who had served in the Confederate States Army), World War I and World War II. However, no justice has been appointed who has served in any subsequent war. The last justice to have served in the military during a declared war was John Paul Stevens, who was in naval intelligence in the Pacific Theater during World War II.

Three justices achieved the rank of general during their military service, with Thomas Johnson and James Wilson both serving as brigadier generals in American Revolutionary War militias, Johnson in the Maryland Militia, and Wilson in the Pennsylvania Militia. William Burnham Woods was a brigadier general and breveted a major general during the American Civil War, in the Union army's 76th Ohio Infantry.

Most recently, Stephen Breyer spent eight years in the United States Army Reserve, including during the Vietnam War era. He spent six months on active duty in the Army Strategic Intelligence in 1957, before the United States became militarily involved in Vietnam. He reached the rank of corporal in the reserve, and was honorably discharged in 1965, but was never deployed in the war zone.

In December 1969, while a sophomore at Princeton, Samuel Alito received a low lottery number of 32 in the Selective Service drawing, increasing his chances of getting drafted into the war. He became a member of the school's Army ROTC program. Alito was commissioned a second lieutenant in the United States Army Reserve in 1972, but did not begin his military duties until after graduating from law school in 1975, after the war in Vietnam had ended. He served on active duty from September to December while attending the Signal Officer Basic Course at Fort Gordon, Georgia. Alito was promoted to first lieutenant and captain, and completed his service obligation as a member of the inactive reserve before being honorably discharged in 1980.

== Financial means ==
The financial position of the typical Supreme Court Justice has been described as "upper-middle to high social status: reared in nonrural but not necessarily urban environment, member of a civic-minded, politically active, economically comfortable family". Charles A. Beard, in his An Economic Interpretation of the Constitution of the United States, profiled those among the justices who were also drafters of the Constitution.

James Wilson, Beard notes, "developed a lucrative practice at Carlisle" before becoming "one of the directors of the Bank of North America on its incorporation in 1781". A member of the Georgia Land Company, Wilson "held shares to the amount of at least one million acres". John Blair was "one of the most respectable men in Virginia, both on account of his Family as well as fortune". Another source notes that Blair "was a member of a prominent Virginia family. His father served on the Virginia Council and was for a time acting Royal governor. His granduncle, James Blair, was founder and first president of the College of William and Mary." John Rutledge was elected Governor of South Carolina at a time when the Constitution of that state set, as a qualification for the office, ownership of "a settled plantation or freehold ... of the value of at least ten thousand pounds currency, clear of debt". Oliver Ellsworth "rose rapidly to wealth and power in the bar of his native state" with "earnings... unrivalled in his own day and unexampled in the history of the colony", developing "a fortune which for the times and the country was quite uncommonly large". Bushrod Washington was the nephew of George Washington, who was at the time of the younger Washington's appointment the immediate past President of the United States and one of the wealthiest men in the country.

"About three-fifths of those named to the Supreme Court personally knew the President who nominated them". There have been exceptions to the typical portrait of justices growing up middle class or wealthy. For example, the family of Sherman Minton went through a period of impoverishment during his childhood, resulting from the disability of his father due to a heat stroke.

In 2008, seven of the nine sitting justices were millionaires, and the remaining two were close to that level of wealth. Historian Howard Zinn, in his 1980 book A People's History of the United States, argues that the justices cannot be neutral in matters between rich and poor, as they are almost always from the upper class. Chief Justice Roberts is the son of an executive with Bethlehem Steel; Justice Stevens was born into a wealthy Chicago family; and Justices Kennedy and Breyer both had fathers who were successful attorneys. Justices Alito and Scalia both had educated (and education-minded) parents: Scalia's father was a highly educated college professor and Alito's father was a high school teacher before becoming "a long-time employee of the New Jersey state legislature". Only Justices Thomas and Sotomayor have been regarded as coming from a lower-class background. One authority states that "Thomas grew up in poverty. The Pin Point community he lived in lacked a sewage system and paved roads. Its inhabitants dwelled in destitution and earned but a few cents each day performing manual labor". The depth of Thomas's poverty has been disputed by suggestions of "ample evidence to suggest that Thomas enjoyed, by and large, a middle-class upbringing".

=== Financial disclosures ===
Beginning in 1979, the Ethics in Government Act of 1978 required federal officials, including the justices, to file annual disclosures of their income and assets. These disclosures provide a snapshot into the wealth of the justices, reported within broad ranges, from year to year since 1979. In the first such set of disclosures, only two justices were revealed to be millionaires: Potter Stewart and Lewis F. Powell, with Chief Justice Warren Burger coming in third with about $600,000 in holdings. The least wealthy Justice was Thurgood Marshall.

The 1982 report disclosed that newly appointed Justice Sandra Day O'Connor was a millionaire, and the second-wealthiest Justice on the court (after Powell). The remaining justices listed assets in the range of tens of thousands to a few hundred-thousand, with the exception of Thurgood Marshall, who "reported no assets or investment income of more than $100". The 1985 report had the justices in relatively the same positions, while the 1992 report had O'Connor as the wealthiest member of the court, with Stevens being the only other millionaire, most other justices reporting assets averaging around a half million dollars, and the two newest justices, Clarence Thomas and David Souter, reporting assets of at least $65,000. In 2011, however, it was revealed that Thomas had misstated his income going back to at least 1989.

The 2007 report was the first to reflect the holdings of John Roberts and Samuel Alito. Disclosures for that year indicated that Clarence Thomas and Anthony Kennedy were the only justices who were clearly not millionaires, although Thomas was reported to have signed a book deal worth over one million dollars. Other justices have reported holdings within the following ranges:

Personal wealth of selected recent justices
Justice	Lowest range	Highest range
John Roberts	$2,400,000	$6,200,000
John Paul Stevens	$1,100,000	$3,500,000
Anthony Kennedy	$365,000	$765,000
David Souter	?	?
Clarence Thomas	$150,000	$410,000
Ruth Bader Ginsburg	$5,000,000	$25,000,000
Stephen Breyer	$4,900,000	$16,800,000
Samuel Alito	$770,000	$2,000,000
Neil Gorsuch	$3,200,000	$7,300,000

The financial disclosures indicate that many of the justices have substantial stock holdings. This, in turn, has affected the business of the court, as these holdings have led justices to recuse themselves from cases, occasionally with substantial impact. For example, in 2008, the recusal of John Roberts in one case, and Samuel Alito in another, resulted in each ending in a 4–4 split, which does not create a binding precedent. The court was unable to decide another case in 2008 because four of the nine justices had conflicts, three arising from stock ownership in affected companies.

== See also ==
- Ideological leanings of United States Supreme Court justices
- List of U.S. Supreme Court justices who also served in the U.S. Congress
- List of law schools attended by United States Supreme Court justices
- List of justices of the Supreme Court of the United States
