= Richard Nixon Supreme Court candidates =

President Richard Nixon entered office in 1969 with Chief Justice Earl Warren having announced his retirement from the Supreme Court of the United States the previous year. Nixon appointed Warren E. Burger to replace Earl Warren, and during his time in office appointed three other members of the Supreme Court: Associate Justices Harry Blackmun, Lewis F. Powell, and William Rehnquist. Nixon also nominated Clement Haynsworth and G. Harrold Carswell for the vacancy that was ultimately filled by Blackmun, but the nominations were rejected by the United States Senate. Nixon's failed Supreme Court nominations were the first since Herbert Hoover's nomination of John J. Parker was rejected by the Senate.

== Politics ==
While Nixon was a candidate for president, the sitting Chief Justice, Earl Warren, had long since become a lightning rod for controversy among conservatives: signs declaring "Impeach Earl Warren" could be seen around the country throughout the 1960s. The unsuccessful impeachment drive was a major focus of the John Birch Society.

=== Warren E. Burger nomination ===
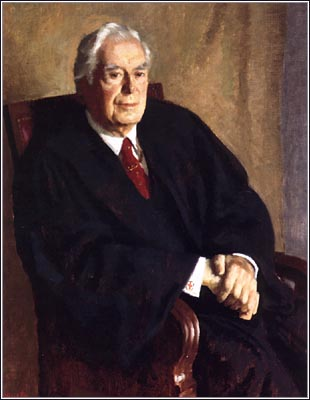
Painting of Burger

In 1968, then-Chief Justice Earl Warren announced his retirement after 15 years on the Court, effective on the confirmation of his successor. President Lyndon B. Johnson nominated sitting Associate Justice Abe Fortas to be elevated to Chief Justice and nominated Homer Thornberry to take Fortas' Associate Justice seat, but a Senate filibuster blocked his confirmation. With Johnson's term as President about to expire before another nominee could be considered, Warren remained in office for another Supreme Court term.

In his presidential campaign, Nixon had pledged to appoint a strict constructionist as Chief Justice. Many speculated that President Richard Nixon would elevate sitting Justice Potter Stewart to the post, some going so far as to call him the frontrunner. Stewart, though flattered by the suggestion, did not want again to appear before and expose his family to the Senate confirmation process. Also, he did not relish the prospect of taking on the administrative responsibilities delegated to the Chief Justice. Accordingly, he met privately with the president to ask for his name to be removed from consideration. Nixon also offered the position to former New York Governor Thomas E. Dewey, who declined.

Instead, in 1969, Nixon nominated Warren E. Burger to the Chief Justice position. Burger had first caught Nixon's eye when the magazine U.S. News & World Report had reprinted a 1967 speech that Burger had given at Ripon College, in which he compared the United States judicial system to those of Norway, Sweden, and Denmark:

I assume that no one will take issue with me when I say that these North European countries are as enlightened as the United States in the value they place on the individual and on human dignity. [Those countries] do not consider it necessary to use a device like our Fifth Amendment, under which an accused person may not be required to testify. They go swiftly, efficiently and directly to the question of whether the accused is guilty. No nation on earth goes to such lengths or takes such pains to provide safeguards as we do, once an accused person is called before the bar of justice and until his case is completed.

Through speeches like this, Burger became known as a critic of Chief Justice Warren and an advocate of a literal, strict-constructionist reading of the U.S. Constitution. Nixon's agreement with these views, being expressed by a readily confirmable, sitting federal appellate judge, led to the appointment.

The Senate confirmed Burger to succeed Warren by a vote of 74—3 on June 9, 1969. Senators Eugene McCarthy (DFL-MN), Gaylord Nelson (D-WI) and Stephen Young (D-OH) voted against the nomination. Senator J. William Fulbright (D-AR) simply voted "present." In total, 22 senators did not vote on the nomination, with Minority Whip Hugh Scott (R-PA) noting that of the senators absent, Marlow Cook (R-KY), Hiram Fong (R-HI), Barry Goldwater (R-AZ), Jacob Javits (R-NY), George Murphy (R-CA), Charles Percy (R-IL) and Winston Prouty (R-VT) would have all voted to pass the nomination. Burger was sworn in as the new Chief Justice on June 23, 1969.

=== Harry Blackmun nomination ===
In 1969, Abe Fortas resigned from the Court due to conflict of interest charges, creating an opening for Nixon's second nomination to the Court.

Nixon asked Lewis F. Powell Jr. to accept a nomination to the Court at that time, but Powell declined his nomination offer at the time. On August 21, 1969, Nixon nominated Clement Haynsworth, then a judge on the Fourth Circuit Court of Appeals. Haynsworth was opposed by Democrats (possibly in retaliation for the Republicans' rejection of Fortas as Chief Justice), Rockefeller Republicans, and the NAACP. He was alleged to have made court decisions favoring segregation and being reflexively anti-labor. Also, he was accused of ruling in cases where he had a financial interest, although this was never proven. His nomination was supported by the Washington Post, generally considered to be the "liberal" newspaper in Washington, D.C. Haynsworth was later termed a "moderate" who was "close in outlook to John Paul Stevens."

Haynsworth was defeated by a 55 to 45 vote on November 21, 1969. Nineteen Democrats – of whom only Mike Gravel of Alaska represented a state outside the South – and 26 Republicans voted for Haynsworth while 38 Democrats and seventeen Republicans voted against the nomination. Haynsworth was the first Supreme Court nominee since John J. Parker (1930) to be defeated by the Senate.

On January 19, 1970, Nixon nominated G. Harrold Carswell to the seat. Carswell was praised by Southern Senators including Richard B. Russell, Jr., but was criticized by others for the high reversal rate (58%) of his decisions as a District Court Judge. Civil-rights advocates also questioned his civil rights record; in 1948, Carswell had voiced support for racial segregation while running for a seat in the Georgia state legislature (in his hometown, Irwinton, Georgia; Carswell did not win the election and moved to Florida where he started his career as a private attorney).

In defense against charges that Carswell was "mediocre", U.S. Senator Roman Hruska (R-NE) stated, "Even if he is mediocre, there are a lot of mediocre judges and people and lawyers. They are entitled to a little representation, aren't they, and a little chance?" That remark is believed to have backfired and damaged Carswell's cause.

On April 8, 1970, the United States Senate refused to confirm Carswell's nomination to serve on the Supreme Court. The vote was 51 to 45, with seventeen Democrats – of whom only Alan Bible of Nevada represented a state outside the South – and twenty-eight Republicans voting for Carswell. Thirteen Republicans, all but five from the Northeast, (Note: The non-Northeastern Republicans were Hiram Fong of Hawaii, Mark O. Hatfield and Robert W. Packwood of Oregon, Charles H. Percy of Illinois and Marlow W. Cook of Kentucky) and thirty-eight Democrats voted against him. Nixon accused Democrats of having an anti-Southern bias as a result.

On April 15, 1970, Nixon nominated Minnesotan Harry Blackmun to fill the Fortas vacancy. Blackmun was confirmed by the Senate by a vote of 94—0 on May 12, 1970. Senators Birch Bayh (D-IN), Al Gore, Sr. (D-TN), Richard Russell, Jr. (D-GA), Barry Goldwater (R-AZ), Karl E. Mundt (R-SD), and John Tower (R-TX) did not vote. Majority Whip Ted Kennedy (D-MA) and Minority Whip Robert P. Griffin (R-MI) made public note on the Senate floor that, out of the six senators not in attendance for the vote, all of them would have voted to confirm Blackmun.

=== Lewis Powell and William Rehnquist nominations ===
On August 28, 1971, Justice Hugo Black admitted himself to the National Naval Medical Center in Bethesda, Maryland. Black subsequently retired from the Court on September 17, thereafter suffering a stroke and dying eight days later. At the same time, Justice John Marshall Harlan II was suffering from deteriorating health: Harlan retired from the Supreme Court on September 23, 1971 and died on December 29, 1971.

Nixon initially intended to nominate Virginia Congressman Richard Harding Poff, but before Nixon could formally nominate him, Poff withdrew. John Dean wrote that Poff actually made that decision based on concerns that he would thus be forced to reveal to his then-12-year-old son Thomas that he had been adopted. Poff's concern was that the child would be negatively affected by that kind of information if revealed before he was old enough to understand.

In mid-October, Nixon's White House released a list of six potential candidates for the two seats, to which Time Magazine responded with a scathing editorial, stating that Nixon had an "opportunity to redress the embarrassment of his two unsuccessful Supreme Court nominations," but that the names released "demonstrated his inability or unwillingness to nominate renowned jurists to the highest tribunal in the land." The list included: West Virginia Senator Robert Byrd, Arkansas attorney Hershel Friday, California appeals court judge Mildred Lillie, Fifth Circuit judge Paul Roney, Fifth Circuit judge Charles Clark, and District of Columbia judge Sylvia Bacon. Although Byrd's name was on the list, the White House had previously indicated that he was not a serious candidate for the seat.

Nixon thereafter announced his intention to nominate Hershel Friday to fill Black's seat, and Mildred Lillie to fill Harlan's seat; Lillie would have been the first female nominee to the Supreme Court. Nixon relented after the American Bar Association found both candidates to be unqualified. Nixon then approached Lewis F. Powell Jr., who had declined the nomination in 1969. Powell remained unsure, but Nixon and his Attorney General, John N. Mitchell, persuaded him that joining the Court was his duty to his nation. Powell and Assistant Attorney General William H. Rehnquist were both nominated on October 21, 1971.

The Senate confirmed Powell by a vote of 89–1 on December 6, 1971. Fred R. Harris (D-OK) was the only senator to oppose the nomination. Senators Wallace F. Bennett (R-UT), Peter H. Dominick (R-CO), David H. Gambrell (D-GA), Hubert Humphrey (DFL-MN), Daniel Inouye (D-HI), Jack Miller (R-IA), Frank Moss (D-UT), Karl E. Mundt (R-SD), Charles Percy (R-IL) and Robert Stafford (R-VT) did not vote. Majority Whip Robert Byrd (D-WV) announced that, out of the absent Democratic senators, Senators Gambrell, Humphrey, Inouye and Moss would have voted to confirm Powell. Minority Whip Robert P. Griffin (R-MI) announced that, out of the absent Republican senators, Senators Bennett, Dominick, Percy and Miller would have voted to confirm Powell.

The Senate confirmation of Rehnquist, a law clerk for the late Justice Robert H. Jackson, was much more contentious. The loudest concerns were voiced by Senators Birch Bayh (D-IN) and Philip Hart (D-MI), who brought up that Rehnquist's nomination was opposed by a record number of unions and organizations, including the AFL–CIO, the United Auto Workers, and the NAACP. The Senate put the concerns to a vote on December 10, 1971, and Rehnquist's nomination passed by a vote of 68–26. Of the 26 senators voting to kill the nomination, nearly all were Democratic; only Clifford P. Case (R-NJ), Edward Brooke (R-MA) (the lone African-American senator at the time) and Jacob Javits (R-NY) jumped party lines in the vote. Senate Majority Leader Mike Mansfield (D-MT), after having previously voted "nay," withdrew his vote as a goodwill gesture to Senator Charles Percy, who could not attend the vote; he would have voted "yea" and counteracted Mansfield's vote. In addition to Percy, Clinton P. Anderson (D-NM), Wallace F. Bennett (R-UT), Karl E. Mundt (R-SD) and Margaret Chase Smith (R-ME) did not vote. Minority Whip Robert P. Griffin (R-MI) announced that Senator Smith would have voted to confirm Rehnquist.

With both votes confirmed, Powell and Rehnquist were sworn in on January 7, 1972.

== Names mentioned ==
Following is a list of individuals who were mentioned in various news accounts and books as having been considered by Nixon for a Supreme Court appointment:

=== United States Supreme Court (elevation to chief justice) ===
- Potter Stewart (1915–1985)

=== United States courts of appeals ===

- Court of Appeals for the Second Circuit
  - Henry Friendly (1903–1986)
  - Walter Mansfield (1911–1987)
  - William H. Mulligan (1918–1996)
- Court of Appeals for the Fourth Circuit
  - Clement Haynsworth (1912–1989) (nominated but rejected by the Senate)
- Court of Appeals for the Fifth Circuit
  - David W. Dyer (1910–1998) (Note: Dyer would later be transferred to the newly created Eleventh Circuit in 1981, although he had assumed senior status in 1976 when Alabama, Georgia and Florida were still part of the Fifth Circuit.)
  - G. Harrold Carswell (1919–1992) (nominated but rejected by the Senate)
  - Charles Clark (1925–2011)
  - Paul Roney (1921–2006)
- Court of Appeals for the Eighth Circuit
  - Harry Blackmun (1908–1999) (nominated and confirmed)
- Court of Appeals for the Ninth Circuit
  - Shirley M. Hufstedler (1925–2016) (Hufstedler later served as Secretary of Health, Education and Welfare and Secretary of Education in Carter's cabinet)
- Court of Appeals for the D.C. Circuit
  - Warren E. Burger (1907–1995) (nominated and confirmed as chief justice)

=== United States district court judges ===
- Edward Thaxter Gignoux (1916–1988) – United States District Court for the District of Maine
- Frank Minis Johnson (1918–1999) – United States District Court for the Middle District of Alabama
- Cornelia Groefsema Kennedy (1923–2014) – United States District Court for the Eastern District of Michigan (Kennedy was elevated to the 6th Circuit by Carter)
- Harold R. Tyler Jr. (1922–2005) – United States District Court for the Southern District of New York

=== Other judges ===
- Sylvia Bacon (1931–2023) – District of Columbia Superior Court judge
- Robert Braucher (1916–1981) – Justice of the Supreme Judicial Court of Massachusetts
- Charles D. Breitel (1908–1991) – Justice of the New York Court of Appeals
- Harry D. Goldman (1903–1995) – New York appellate judge
- Mildred Lillie (1915–2002) – California appellate judge
- Robert Hugh McWilliams Jr. (1916–2013) – Justice of the Supreme Court of Colorado
- Paul Reardon (1909–1989) – Justice of the Supreme Judicial Court of Massachusetts
- Susie Marshall Sharp (1907–1996) – Justice of the Supreme Court of North Carolina

=== United States senators ===
- Howard Baker (1925–2014) — Tennessee
- Robert Byrd (1917–2010) — West Virginia

=== United States representatives ===
- Martha W. Griffiths (1912–2003) – Michigan
- Margaret M. Heckler (1931–2018) – Massachusetts
- Wilbur Mills (1909–1992) – Arkansas
- Richard H. Poff (1923–2011) – Virginia

=== Executive branch officials ===
- Spiro Agnew (1918–1996) – Vice President of the United States
- William H. Brown (born 1928) – chairman of the Equal Employment Opportunity Commission
- Robert Bork (1927–2012) – Solicitor General (nominated by Ronald Reagan in 1987, but rejected)
- William Rehnquist (1924-2005) – Assistant U.S. Attorney General (nominated and confirmed)
- Caspar Weinberger (1917–2006) – director of the Bureau of the Budget

=== Law professors ===
- Alexander M. Bickel (1924–1974) – professor of law, Yale Law School
- Philip B. Kurland (1921–1996) – professor of law, University of Chicago Law School
- Soia Mentschikoff (1915–1984) – professor of law, University of Chicago Law School
- Dorothy Wright Nelson (born 1928) – professor of law, University of Southern California Law School
- Ellen Peters (1930–2024) – professor of law, Yale Law School
- Charles Alan Wright (1927–2000) – professor of law, University of Texas Law School

=== Other backgrounds ===
- Constance E. Cook (1919–2009) – New York State Assemblywoman
- Thomas E. Dewey (1902–1971) – former governor of New York and Republican presidential nominee
- Herschel Friday (1922–1994) – private attorney in Little Rock, Arkansas
- Jason L. Honigman (1904–1990) – private attorney in Detroit, Michigan
- Jewel Lafontant (1922–1997) – private attorney in Chicago, Illinois
- Lewis F. Powell Jr. (1907–1998) – private attorney in Richmond, Virginia (nominated and confirmed)
- William Pullman, private attorney in Philadelphia, Pennsylvania (Note: Dean later notes that "Bill Pullman from Philadelphia" was suggested by Attorney General John Mitchell because Pullman was a black Republican, but was quickly dismissed by Nixon because such an appointment would put two blacks on the court.)
- Charles S. Rhyne (1912–2003) – private attorney in the District of Columbia
- William French Smith (1917–1990) – private attorney in Los Angeles, California
- Arlen Specter (1930–2012) – District Attorney of Philadelphia
- Col. Arthur P. Ireland, Judge Advocate (retired), US Army

== See also ==
- United States federal judge
- Judicial appointment history for United States federal courts
