= J. Edward Lumbard =

American judge (1901–1999)

Joseph Edward Lumbard Jr.

Senior Judge of the United States Court of Appeals for the Second Circuit
- In office July 20, 1971 – June 3, 1999

Chief Judge of the United States Court of Appeals for the Second Circuit
- In office 1959–1971
- Preceded by: Charles Edward Clark
- Succeeded by: Henry Friendly

Judge of the United States Court of Appeals for the Second Circuit
- In office July 12, 1955 – July 20, 1971
- Appointed by: Dwight D. Eisenhower
- Preceded by: John Marshall Harlan II
- Succeeded by: William Hughes Mulligan

Personal details
- Born: Joseph Edward Lumbard Jr. August 18, 1901 New York City, New York, U.S.
- Died: June 3, 1999 (aged 97) Fairfield, Connecticut, U.S.
- Party: Republican
- Education: Harvard University (AB, LLB)

Joseph Edward Lumbard Jr. (August 18, 1901 – June 3, 1999) was a United States circuit judge of the United States Court of Appeals for the Second Circuit.

== Early life and career ==
Born on August 18, 1901, in Harlem, New York City, New York, Lumbard attended DeWitt Clinton High School in The Bronx. He received an Artium Baccalaureus degree in 1922 from Harvard University and, after attending the Fordham University School of Law, received a Bachelor of Laws from Harvard Law School. In 1920, while an undergraduate at Harvard University, he was expelled by its "Secret Court" of 1920 for associating with a group of homosexuals, including his roommate. He was readmitted a year later. He was an Assistant United States Attorney for the Southern District of New York from 1925 to 1927 and again from 1931 to 1933, serving as Chief of the Criminal Division from 1931 to 1933. He served as a special assistant attorney general for the State of New York from 1928 to 1929, in 1930, in 1936 and in 1942. He also served as President of the New York Young Republican Club from 1929 to 1930.

He was in private practice in New York City from 1929 to 1931 and again from 1933 to 1953. In 1933, he became a founding partner in the law firm of Donovan, Leisure, Newton & Lumbard. He served as an assistant campaign manager for Thomas E. Dewey's unsuccessful campaign for president in 1944. He was a Justice of the New York Supreme Court in 1947. He was the United States Attorney for the Southern District of New York from 1953 to 1955.

== Federal judicial service ==
Lumbard was nominated by President Dwight D. Eisenhower on May 13, 1955, to a seat on the United States Court of Appeals for the Second Circuit vacated by Judge John Marshall Harlan. He was confirmed by the United States Senate on July 11, 1955, and received his commission on the next day. He served as Chief Judge from 1959 to 1971. He was a member of the Judicial Conference of the United States from 1960 to 1971. He assumed senior status on July 20, 1971. His service terminated on June 3, 1999, due to his death in Fairfield, Connecticut.

=== Modern Settings v. Prudential ===
One landmark decision penned by Lumbard was Modern Settings v. Prudential (1991), which dealt with a dispute between an investor and a broker over alleged unauthorized trading.

The customer agreement between the parties provided "Reports of the execution of orders and statements of my account shall be conclusive if not objected to within five days and ten days, respectively, after transmittal to me (Modern Settings) by mail or otherwise."

Lumbard held that such a contract clause is presumptively enforceable. It is reasonable to require that a customer memorialize his objections so courts will not become a forum for endless swearing contests between brokers and customers.

On the other hand, he allowed for the possibility of the invalidity of such a clause in some cases. "There will be instances where a disparity in sophistication between a brokerage firm and its customer will warrant a flexible application of such written notice clauses.... Similarly, we do not foreclose the possibility that a broker may be estopped from raising a defense based on the written notice clause if the broker's own assurances of deceptive acts forestall the customer's filing of their required written complaint."

== Other service ==
He declined a request from President Nixon to be the special prosecutor in the infamous Watergate scandal, a job that was later taken up by Archibald Cox. In 1959, he was appointed to the Harvard Board of Overseers and served for ten years. From 1964 to 1968, He was chairman of the American Bar Association's Committee to Develop Minimum Standards for Criminal Justice. In 1968, he was awarded the A.B.A.'s gold medal for his contributions to justice administration.

== See also ==
- List of United States federal judges by longevity of service

Legal offices
Preceded by John Marshall Harlan II	Judge of the United States Court of Appeals for the Second Circuit; 1955–1971	Succeeded by William Hughes Mulligan
Preceded by Charles Edward Clark	Chief Judge of the United States Court of Appeals for the Second Circuit; 1959–1971	Succeeded by Henry Friendly
