= Friday-Graham Rail Spur =

The Friday-Graham Rail Spur is a branch rail line connecting the West Memphis Port to the Union Pacific Railroad near the city of West Memphis, Arkansas, United States. The railroad company serves the port directly via the spur.

Starting in late 1991, the city rebuilt an abandoned Union Pacific branch that had served a place known as Tennark. The completed line was dedicated on May 19, 1994, twelve years after the port opened, and was named after Little Rock lawyer Hershel Friday, counsel for Union Pacific, and George Graham, former UP Southern Region general manager and consultant for the city.
