= Richard J. Cardamone =

American judge (1925 – 2015)

Senior Judge of the United States Court of Appeals for the Second Circuit
- In office November 13, 1993 – October 16, 2015

Judge of the United States Court of Appeals for the Second Circuit
- In office October 29, 1981 – November 13, 1993
- Appointed by: Ronald Reagan
- Preceded by: William Hughes Mulligan
- Succeeded by: José A. Cabranes

Personal details
- Born: Richard Joseph Cardamone; October 10, 1925 Utica, New York, U.S.
- Died: October 16, 2015 (aged 90) Clinton, New York, U.S.
- Education: Harvard University (BA); Syracuse University College of Law (LLB)

Richard Joseph Cardamone (October 10, 1925 – October 16, 2015) was a United States circuit judge of the United States Court of Appeals for the Second Circuit.

== Early life and career ==
Born in Utica, New York in 1925, Cardamone was in the United States Navy during World War II, from 1943 to 1946, and then received a Bachelor of Arts degree from Harvard University in 1948 and a Bachelor of Laws from Syracuse University College of Law in 1952. He then entered private practice in Utica, until 1962.

== Judicial service ==
In 1962 Cardamone began his judicial career by gaining election to the New York State Supreme Court, serving as a Justice from 1963 to 1981. On October 1, 1981, Cardamone was nominated by President Ronald Reagan to a seat on the United States Court of Appeals for the Second Circuit vacated by Judge William Hughes Mulligan. He was confirmed by the United States Senate on October 29, 1981, and received his commission the same day. Cardamone assumed senior status on November 13, 1993. Cardamone died on October 16, 2015.

=== Reported Decisions ===
Cardamone began his opinion in Demoret v. Zegarelli, 451 F.3d 140 (2d Cir. 2006) by noting a defendant's connection to a classic American short story:

The case before us on this appeal has as one of the named defendants the Village of Sleepy Hollow (Village), a small municipality located on the banks of the Hudson River in Westchester County, New York. The very name Sleepy Hollow evokes shades of the Headless Horseman, Ichabod Crane, and Katrina Van Tassel-all fictional figures made famous by Washington Irving in The Legend of Sleepy Hollow (Wildside Press 2004) (1917). According to the legend, the Headless Horseman haunts this tranquil village. Its ghost is reportedly responsible for numerous frightful encounters, including one in which the specter scared the schoolmaster, Ichabod Crane, out of town. In this case we do not deal with a headless horseman, but with discord of another kind-the alleged discriminatory treatment faced by plaintiffs, two female employees of the Village.

— Demoret v. Zegarelli, 451 F.3d 140, 144 (2d Cir. 2006)

Cardamone also wrote the appellate decision affirming the District Court decision by Judge Thomas P. Griesa that invalidated the U.S. Army Corps of Engineers' permit for Westway, a proposed highway on the West Side of Manhattan.

Legal offices
Preceded by William Hughes Mulligan	Judge of the United States Court of Appeals for the Second Circuit; 1981–1993	Succeeded by José A. Cabranes
