= Sylvia Bacon =

American judge (1931–2023)

Associate Judge of the Superior Court of the District of Columbia
- In office 1970–1991
- Appointed by: Richard Nixon
- Succeeded by: Reggie Walton

Personal details
- Born: July 9, 1931 Watertown, South Dakota, U.S.
- Died: April 29, 2023 (aged 91) Washington, D.C., U.S.
- Party: Republican
- Education: Vassar College (Bachelor of Arts); London School of Economics (Graduate certificate); Harvard University (Bachelor of Laws); Georgetown University (Master of Laws)

Sylvia Adelaide Bacon (July 9, 1931 – April 29, 2023) was an American judge of the Superior Court of the District of Columbia who was considered by both Richard Nixon and Ronald Reagan as a potential nominee to the Supreme Court of the United States at a time when no women had yet been appointed to the Court.

== Early life and education ==
Born in Watertown, South Dakota, Bacon graduated Watertown High School in 1949 and received a Bachelor of Arts in economics from Vassar College in 1952, a Graduate Certificate in economics from the London School of Economics through a Rotary Fellowship in 1953, a Bachelor of Laws from Harvard Law School in 1956 and a Master of Laws from the Georgetown University Law Center in 1959. While at Vassar, she was an officer in the National Student Association. From 1956 to 1957, Bacon was a law clerk to Judge Burnita Shelton Matthews of the United States District Court for the District of Columbia.

== Career ==
Bacon worked in various positions within the United States Department of Justice from 1956 to 1970, and during this time, she "helped draft the District of Columbia's controversial no-knock crime bill", and "served under Ramsey Clark and helped draft legislation for court reform in the District of Columbia." She was appointed to the Superior Court of the District of Columbia in 1970, serving until 1991.

=== Possible Supreme Court nomination ===
When Hugo Black and John Marshall Harlan II retired and died close together in the fall of 1971, Bacon was on President Nixon's original list of six possible replacements. After Mildred Lillie, one of Nixon's two initial choices, was rejected by the American Bar Association as "Not Qualified" she briefly came into serious consideration. Most advisers to Nixon thought Bacon was a little too young at only forty, but Nixon disagreed with this thesis, and it is known the President thought very well of the recently appointed judge. However, Nixon's advisers thought the ABA would almost certainly rate Bacon as "Not Qualified", especially as she had been a judge for only one year. Bacon was thus rejected.

Bacon was again tipped by the press as a possible nominee when Ronald Reagan made his first appointment in 1981 after promising to appoint the first woman Justice. Bacon made the Justice Department's initial list but failed to make the final list for the seat, which went to Sandra Day O'Connor.

=== Later career ===
In 1986, after "complaints" by "prosecutors and defense lawyers" about her appearing to be "confused and disoriented", Bacon was treated for alcohol abuse, as documented by Elsa Walsh in The Washington Post. In 1987, the highest appellate court in the District of Columbia reversed Bacon's ruling against Georgetown University LGBTQ undergraduate and law students in Gay Rights Coalition v. Georgetown University, in which Bacon had found that Georgetown's religious origin protected it from complying with the District of Columbia Human Rights Act, which bans discrimination on the basis of sexual orientation.

As of June 2010, Bacon was a "distinguished lecturer" on the faculty of the Catholic University of America, Columbus School of Law.

== Death ==
Bacon died on April 29, 2023, at the age of 91.
