= Herschel Friday =

American lawyer

Personal details
- Born: February 10, 1922 Lockesburg, Arkansas, U.S.
- Died: March 1, 1994 (aged 72) near Little Rock, Arkansas, U.S.
- Party: Democratic
- Education: University of Arkansas, Little; Rock (BA); University of Arkansas, Fayetteville (LLB)

Herschel Hugar Friday (February 10, 1922 – March 1, 1994) was an Arkansas bond lawyer. He was best known for having been considered by President Richard Nixon for an appointment as Associate Justice of the United States Supreme Court in 1971. Also, he and his law firm represented the Little Rock School District during the 1957 Central High School Crisis, and defended various school districts in Arkansas against desegregation lawsuits throughout the 1960s.

During the summer of 1971, both John Marshall Harlan II and Hugo Black announced their intention to retire from the Supreme Court. Nixon strongly considered nominating Friday and California Court of Appeals judge Mildred Lillie to the open seats. Also under consideration by Nixon were: Robert C. Byrd, Sylvia Bacon, Charles Clark and Paul Hitch Roney.

The American Bar Association's Committee on the Federal Judiciary, which since 1952 has provided its analysis and a recommendation on each nominees' professional qualifications to sit on the Supreme Court, voted 11–1 to give Lillie an "unqualified" rating, and, with eight votes necessary for a "qualified" rating, voted 6–6 on Friday, thus ending up as "not opposed" to his nomination. These were the first instances in which negative recommendations were issued by the ABA since it began participating in the Supreme Court nomination and confirmation process. Nixon also learned that the prospects of Senate confirmation were not good for either Lillie or Friday. In light of these developments, the president nominated Lewis Powell and William H. Rehnquist instead. Friday was informed of the change in plan only hours before the Powell and Rehnquist nominations were announced live on national television; reporters and friends were waiting for news at his house with him.

Friday continued with his Arkansas law firm, Friday, Eldredge & Clark, LLP. He became recognized as one of the most influential lobbyists in the area, and he wielded his influence on behalf of the horse-racing interest Oaklawn Park. In 1988, he was particularly successful in getting Governor Bill Clinton to sign a tax package that was beneficial to horse racing. Friday would later be a benefactor of Clinton as Governor and, later, President of the United States.

Friday died on March 1, 1994, when he failed to maintain control of his aircraft, while maneuvering to land at Bobwhite Hill Ranch, Arkansas. The aircraft impacted the ground and was destroyed. Factors related to the accident were: darkness and possible spatial disorientation. He was survived by his wife, Beth.

== See also ==
- Friday-Graham Rail Spur
