= William Hughes Mulligan =

American judge (1918–1996)

William Mulligan

Judge of the United States Court of Appeals for the Second Circuit
- In office May 27, 1971 – March 31, 1981
- Appointed by: Richard Nixon
- Preceded by: J. Edward Lumbard
- Succeeded by: Richard J. Cardamone

Personal details
- Born: William Hughes Mulligan; March 5, 1918 New York City, New York, U.S.
- Died: May 13, 1996 (aged 78) Bronxville, New York, U.S.
- Party: Republican
- Education: Fordham University (AB, JD)

William Hughes Mulligan (March 5, 1918 – May 13, 1996) was a United States circuit judge of the United States Court of Appeals for the Second Circuit.

== Education and career ==
Born on March 5, 1918, in New York City, New York, Mulligan received an Artium Baccalaureus degree in 1939 from Fordham University and a Juris Doctor in 1942 from Fordham University School of Law. He served in the United States Army as a special agent for the Counterintelligence Corps from 1942 to 1946. He served on the faculty of Fordham University School of Law in a number of capacities from 1946 to 1971, specifically as a lecturer from 1946 to 1952, as an associate professor from 1953 to 1954, as assistant dean and professor of law from 1954 to 1956, as dean from 1956 to 1971 and as the Wilkinson Professor of Law from 1961 to 1971.

== Federal judicial service ==
Mulligan was nominated by President Richard Nixon on April 26, 1971, to a seat on the United States Court of Appeals for the Second Circuit vacated by Judge J. Edward Lumbard. He was confirmed by the United States Senate on May 20, 1971, and received his commission on May 27, 1971. Soon after his confirmation, Mulligan appeared on the short list for the Supreme Court seats formerly occupied by Hugo Black and John Marshall Harlan II. The administration's opinion was that Mulligan's lack of experience as an appellate judge stood against appointment to the Black or Harlan seats, but he would be a likely candidate for the seats then held by William O. Douglas or William J. Brennan Jr. when they became open. However, when the Douglas seat did become open in 1975, there exists no evidence for Gerald Ford ever considering Mulligan as his replacement.

He served as a board member of the Federal Judicial Center from 1979 to 1981. His service terminated on March 31, 1981, due to his resignation. In resigning, he stated that the salary for federal appellate judges was too low to provide for his family. He once stated that while he could possibly live on a judge's salary, he could not afford to die on it.

== Post judicial service and death ==
After his resignation from the federal bench, he engaged in the private practice of law with the law firm of Skadden, Arps, Slate, Meagher & Flom in New York City from 1981 to 1991. He retired in 1991 after suffering a stroke. He died in Bronxville, New York on May 13, 1996.

== Other service and publication ==
In addition to his legal career, Mulligan was a successful public speaker delivering acclaimed humorous and serious remarks to a variety of organizations from bar associations to Irish-American civic groups. A collection of Mulligan's after-dinner speeches was edited and posthumously published with an introduction by Mulligan's son, William Hughes Mulligan, Jr., under the title Mulligan's Law: The Wit and Wisdom of William Hughes Mulligan (Fordham University Press 1997).

== Honor ==
A summer intramural moot court competition at Fordham Law, for rising second-year students, is named for Mulligan. Students who do well receive invitations to join the Fordham Moot Court Board.

== Sources ==
Legal offices
Preceded by J. Edward Lumbard	Judge of the United States Court of Appeals for the Second Circuit; 1971–1981	Succeeded by Richard J. Cardamone
