= Mildred Lillie =

American judge (1915–2002)

Judge of the California Court of Appeal for the Second District
- In office 1958–2002

Personal details
- Born: Mildred Loree Kluckhohn; January 25, 1915 Ida Grove, Iowa, U.S.
- Died: October 27, 2002 (aged 87) Los Angeles, California, U.S.
- Party: Democratic
- Education: University of California, Berkeley (BA, JD)

Mildred Loree Lillie (January 25, 1915 – October 27, 2002) was an American jurist. She served as a judge for 55 years in the state of California with a career that spanned from 1947 until her death in 2002. In 1958, she became the second woman to serve on the Court of Appeal, a role in which she served for a record 44 years. In 1971, she was considered by President Richard Nixon for nomination as the first woman on the Supreme Court of the United States; however, an "unqualified" rating from the American Bar Association derailed that bid.

== Early life and education ==
Mildred Loree Kluckhohn was born in Ida Grove, Iowa, but moved with her mother to California's San Joaquin Valley as a child following her parents' failed marriage. She worked at a local cannery during the Great Depression and later as both a cook and a floor detective at Sears to earn her tuition to law school.

Lillie obtained her a Bachelor of Arts degree and Juris Doctor from the University of California, Berkeley.

== Career ==
After graduating from law school, she was a deputy city attorney for Alameda, California. After a few years in private practice, she served as an Assistant United States Attorney from 1942 to 1946. In 1947, Republican governor Earl Warren appointed her to the Los Angeles Municipal Court. For a time, she served in the Domestic Relations Division where one of her cases was the custody hearing for Pia Lindström between actress Ingrid Bergman and her ex-husband Petter Lindström. Warren appointed her to the Los Angeles County Superior Court in 1949 at the age of 32, the youngest person ever named to the Superior Court. In 1958, Republican governor Goodwin Knight appointed Lillie, a Democrat, to the Second District Court of Appeal.

In 1971, President Richard Nixon had two seats on the Supreme Court to fill with the retirements of John Marshall Harlan and Hugo Black. Nixon floated Lillie and Arkansas bond lawyer Herschel Friday as potential nominees for the open seats. Nixon also proposed Senator Robert C. Byrd, Judges Sylvia Bacon, Charles Clark and Paul Hitch Roney for the seat. Although Nixon had said that he didn't think that women should be in any government job and that women were "erratic" and "emotional", he saw political gain in nominating a woman to the court. The Attorney General thought Lillie might be a good choice in that she was a Democrat, but a conservative. In his report to the president, he noted that California Governor Pat Brown turned her down for a seat on the state supreme court because she was too conservative.

Lillie's candidacy for the seat ran into trouble when professor Laurence Tribe of Harvard Law School submitted a memorandum that criticized Lillie's qualifications with regard to judicial opinions that were overturned by the California Supreme Court. In a 2009 interview at the Miller Center for Public Affairs Tribe repeated his criticism saying that she was "both right wing and stupid" and that she had written seven opinions that were reversed by the California Supreme Court. Assistant Attorney General William H. Rehnquist, who became the eventual nominee and, later Chief Justice, defended Lillie in a memo. He wrote that of 1,160 opinions written by Lillie, only 69 were reviewed by the higher courts. He noted that 38 of her opinions were reversed, which was consistent with reversal rates in California. In a final blow to her hopes of nomination, the American Bar Association voted 11–1 that she was unqualified to serve on the court. Nixon also learned that the Senate might confirm neither Lillie nor Friday. In response, he nominated Lewis Powell and Rehnquist to the court.

In his book The Rehnquist Choice: The Untold Story of the Nixon Appointment that Redefined the Supreme Court, former White House Counsel John Dean noted that he had compared the qualifications of Lillie to Justice Sandra Day O'Connor and found Lillie to be at least as qualified if not more so. Dean also said that the greatest opposition to Lillie came from Chief Justice Warren E. Burger who was opposed to the idea of a woman on the court. Dean indicated that Burger threatened to resign over the nomination.

Lillie continued to serve on the Appeals Court until her death in 2002. At the time of her death, she was on the ballot for judicial retention. Mildred Lillie died on October 27, 2002, at the age of 87. She was reportedly suffering from cancer.

== Personal life ==
She married Cameron Lillie in 1947. Cameron Lillie died in 1959. She married her second husband, A. V. Falcone in 1966. Falcone died in 1996. She had no children of her own, but two stepchildren from her marriage to Falcone. Her stepson Dewey Falcone was a judge on the Los Angeles County Superior Court from 1993 until 2013.
