= Joseph Woods =

Joseph Woods may refer to:

- Joseph Woods (architect) (1776–1864), English Quaker architect, botanist and geologist
- Joseph Woods (engineer) (1816-1849)
- Joseph Woods (Province of Canada politician)
- Joseph Andrew Woods (1870–1925), politician in Northern Ireland
- Joseph A. Woods Jr. (1925–2013), American lawyer from Alabama
- Joseph Woods (poet) (born 1966), Irish poet

== See also ==
- Joe Woods (disambiguation)
- Joseph Wood (disambiguation)
