= Joseph Wood =

Joseph Wood may refer to:

- Joseph Wood (congressman) (1712–1791), American planter and Continental Congressman for Georgia
- Joseph Wood (painter) (c. 1778–1830), American painter
- Joseph Wood (Wisconsin politician) (1809–1890), American pioneer and Wisconsin state legislator
- Joseph Wood (schoolmaster) (1841–1923), English headmaster of Harrow and other schools
- Joseph D. Wood (1867–1959), mayor of Norfolk, Virginia
- Joseph Garnett Wood (1900–1959), Australian professor of botany
- Joseph K. Wood, American Republican political leader
- Joseph M. Wood, head coach of the University of Virginia college football program, 1914
- Joseph R. Wood (1915–2000), American composer
- Joseph Rudolph Wood (1958–2014), American murderer whose prolonged execution has created some controversy

== See also ==
- Joe Wood (disambiguation)
- Joseph Woods (disambiguation)
