= Senator Woods =

Senator Woods may refer to:

- Aaron Woods (politician) (1950–2025), Oregon State Senate
- Harriett Woods (1927–2007), Missouri State Senate
- Jane Woods (1946–2022), Virginia State Senate
- John M. Woods (1839–1927), Massachusetts State Senate
- John Woods (Pennsylvania politician) (1761–1816), Pennsylvania State Senate
- Jon Woods (born 1977), Arkansas State Senate
- Joseph Andrew Woods (1870–1925), Northern Irish Senate
- Laura J. Woods (born 1961), Colorado State Senate
- Matt Woods (politician) (born 1982), Alabama State Senate
- Pat Woods (politician) (born 1948/49), New Mexico State Senate
- Samuel V. Woods (1856–?), West Virginia State Senate
- Tom Woods (Oklahoma politician) (born 1994/95), Oklahoma State Senate
