= Joe Wood =

Joe Wood may refer to:

- Smoky Joe Wood (1889–1985), American baseball player
- Joe T. Wood (1922–2019), American politician
- Joe Wood (infielder) (1919–1985), American baseball player
- Joe Wood (1944 pitcher) (1916–2002), American baseball player
- Joe Wood (footballer) (1904–1972), Australian footballer for North Melbourne
- Joe Wood (musician) (fl. c. 1980), singer among band T.S.O.L.'s second complement of musicians

== See also ==
- Joseph Wood (disambiguation)
