= Joe Woods =

Joe Woods may refer to:

- Joe Wood (footballer) (1904–1972), or Joe Woods, Australian rules footballer
- Joe Woods (American football) (born 1970), American football coach

== See also ==
- Joseph Woods (disambiguation)
