= John Doar =

American lawyer (1921–2014)

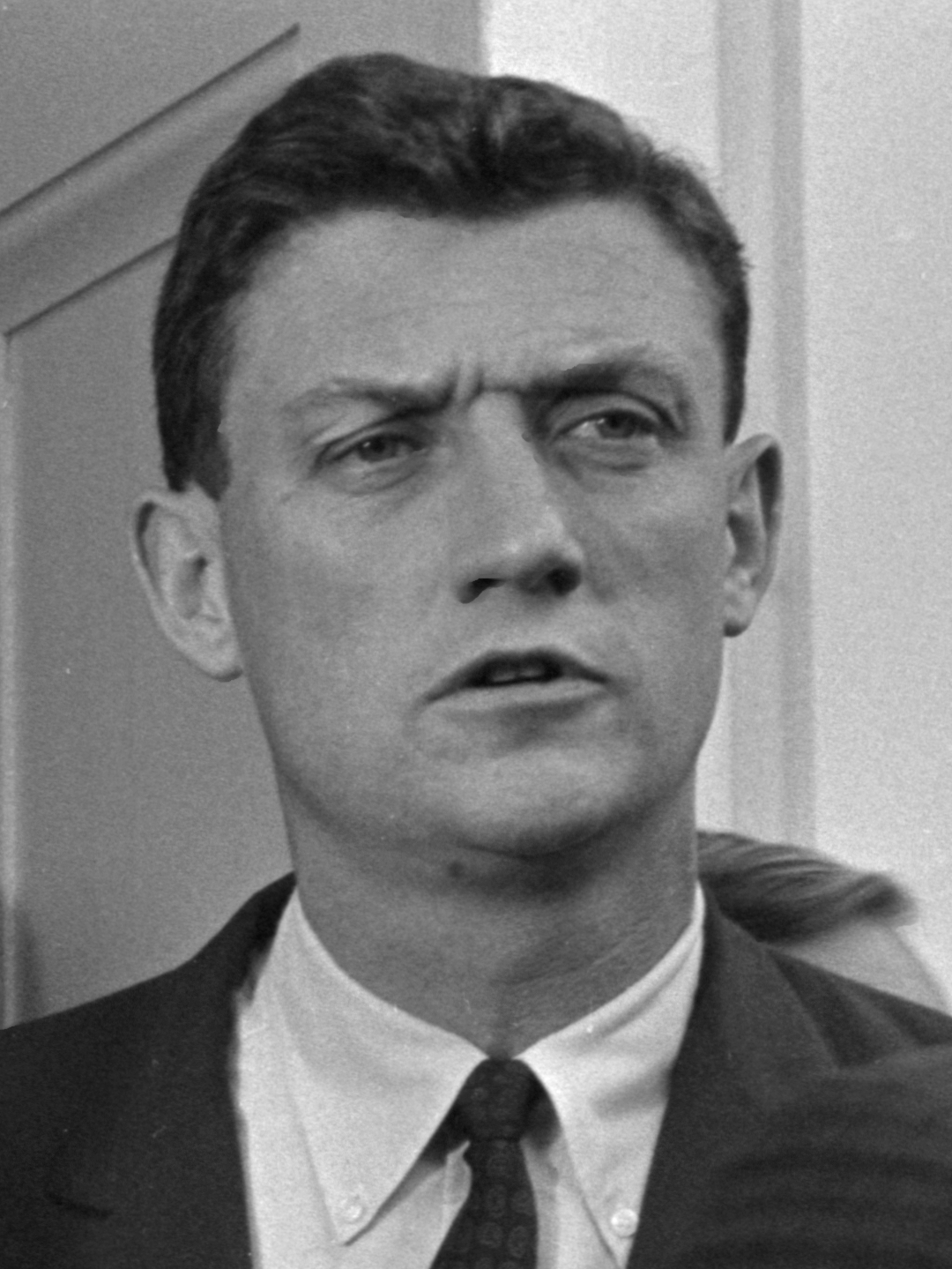
- Doar in 1962
- Born: John Michael Doar; December 3, 1921; Minneapolis, Minnesota, U.S.
- Died: November 11, 2014 (aged 92); New York City, U.S.
- Education: Princeton University (BA); University of California, Berkeley (LLB)
- Occupation: Lawyer
- Political party: Republican
- Awards: President's Award for Distinguished Federal Civilian Service (1964)

John Michael Doar (December 3, 1921 – November 11, 2014) was an American lawyer and senior counsel with the law firm Doar Rieck Kaley & Mack in New York City.

During the administrations of presidents John F. Kennedy and Lyndon B. Johnson, he served first as Deputy Assistant Attorney General for Civil Rights from 1961 to 1965, and then as head of the division from 1965 until 1967. He led the government's response to events such as the admission and protection of James Meredith, the first black student admitted to the University of Mississippi, as well as the evolving response to the civil rights movement promoting integration and voter registration in the South. Additionally, in 1973–74, he served as the lead special counsel for the U.S. House Judiciary Committee's impeachment inquiry staff during the impeachment process against Richard Nixon.

== Early life and education ==
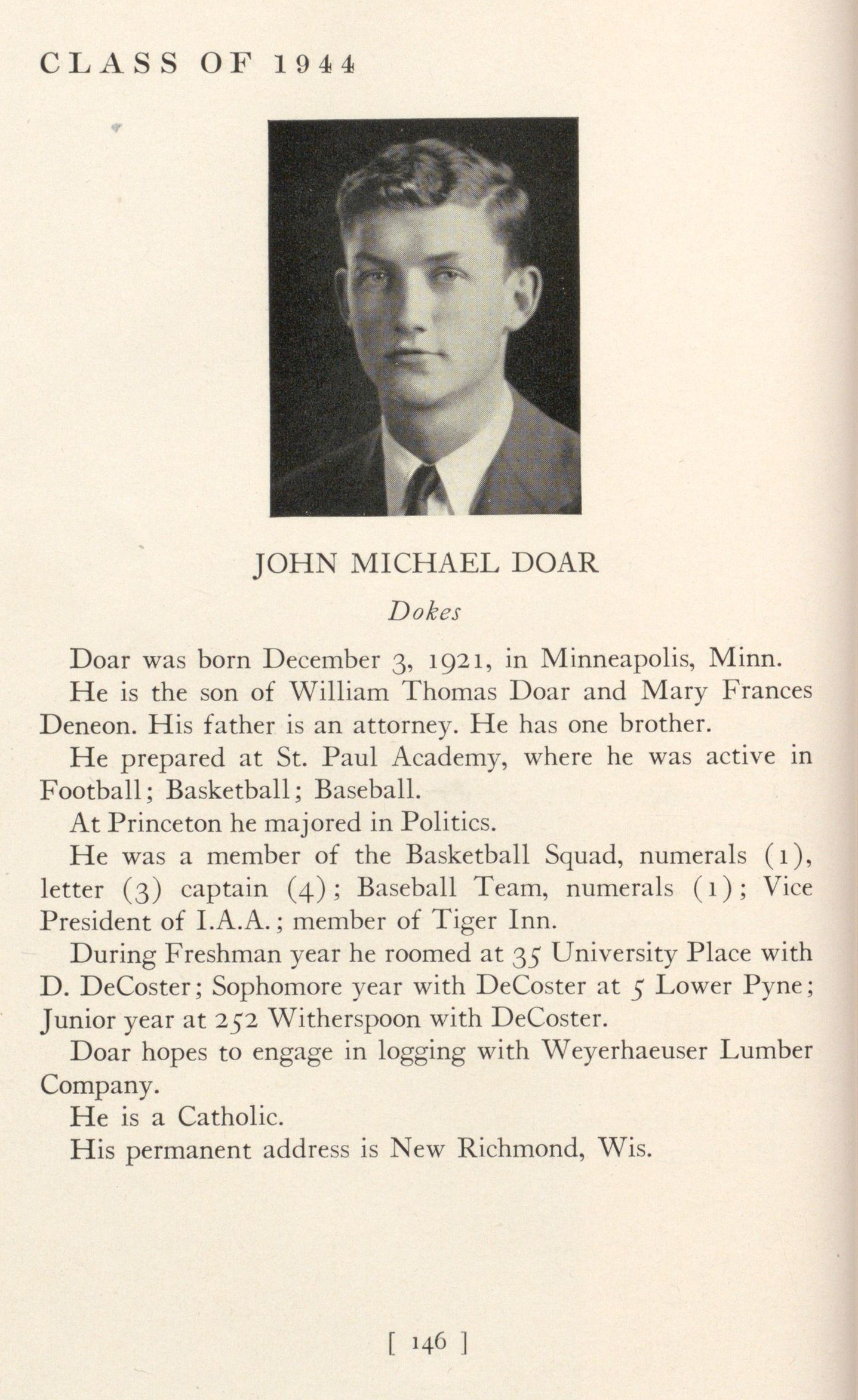
Doar in the Princeton University yearbook, 1944

John Michael Doar was born in Minneapolis, Minnesota, the son of William Thomas Doar (1882-1952) and Mary Frances ("May") Doar (née Deneen) (1885-1982).

John Doar graduated from St. Paul Academy and Summit School in Saint Paul, Minnesota in 1940. He served as a military pilot in the United States Army Air Forces during World War II. Upon completion of his senior thesis, "An Analysis of Farmer Cooperatives, 1918–1946", he graduated in 1944 with a bachelor's degree (an A.B. in political science) from the School of Public and International Affairs (now the Princeton School of Public and International Affairs) at Princeton University. He then received a baccalaureate of law (LL.B.) degree from the University of California, Berkeley, School of Law.

From 1950 through 1960, John Doar worked in his family's law firm in New Richmond, Wisconsin.

== Civil rights career ==
External videos
- “Eyes on the Prize; Interview with John Doar” conducted in 1985 for the Eyes on the Prize documentary in which he describes the integration of the University of Mississippi and his role in investigating murders of civil rights activists and other forms of intimidation in the South.

A Republican, Doar served as Deputy Assistant and then Assistant Attorney General for Civil Rights in the U.S. Dept. of Justice, from 1960 to 1967, during which time he was involved in several of the most significant events of the American civil rights movement. In 1961 he operated in Montgomery, Alabama, along with his assistant, John Seigenthaler, to protect the Freedom Riders.

In 1962, he confronted Ross Barnett over Barnett's attempts to prevent James Meredith from entering the segregated University of Mississippi. He also prosecuted Collie Wilkins for federal civil rights violations in the murder of Viola Liuzzo, gaining conviction by an all-white jury in Alabama. In 1963, he calmed an angry mob after the assassination of civil rights leader Medgar Evers, murdered outside his home.

After Andrew Goodman, James Chaney and Michael Schwerner, young civil rights workers, were murdered in Mississippi, Doar prosecuted the federal case against their alleged murderers, charging them with civil rights violations. He also acted as the federal chief counsel during the Theron Lynd litigation, a circuit clerk and voter registrar in Forrest County, Mississippi accused of discrimination.

He had earlier contributed to drafting the Civil Rights Act of 1964, which Lyndon Johnson signed to try to secure constitutional rights for all citizens. In March 1965, Doar was the first to arrive in Montgomery, Alabama, during the third of the Selma to Montgomery marches. He walked into Montgomery half a block ahead of the march in his capacity as Assistant Attorney General.

Doar left the government in 1967. He went into private practice and worked for Bedford Stuyvesant Development Corporation. From late 1968 to 1969 he was president of the New York City Board of Education. During his tenure he opposed the entry of girls to all-boy high schools.

== Nixon impeachment inquiry ==
Doar was hired in December 1973 to be the lead special counsel for the House Judiciary Committee's impeachment inquiry staff during the impeachment process against Richard Nixon. He supervised a team which in due course grew to 100 persons, including lawyers, investigators, clerks and stenographers. To minimize leaks he established strict rules of conduct that included this directive: "The staff of the impeachment inquiry shall not discuss with anyone outside the staff either the substance or procedure of their work or that of the committee."

== Later career ==
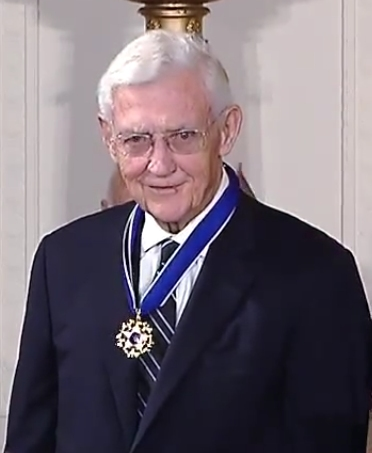
Doar in 2012, upon receiving the Presidential Medal of Freedom

He then started a law firm in New York City: Doar, Rieck, Kaley, & Mack.

== Death ==
John Michael Doar, 92, died of congestive heart failure on November 11, 2014. He was predeceased by his wife, Anne Murray (née Leffingwell) Doar (who had passed away in February, 2012). He was survived by his brother, William Thomas “Tom” Doar, Jr. (who passed away in June, 2016).

He was also survived by his children, Gael, Michael, Robert, and Burke.

== Gallery ==
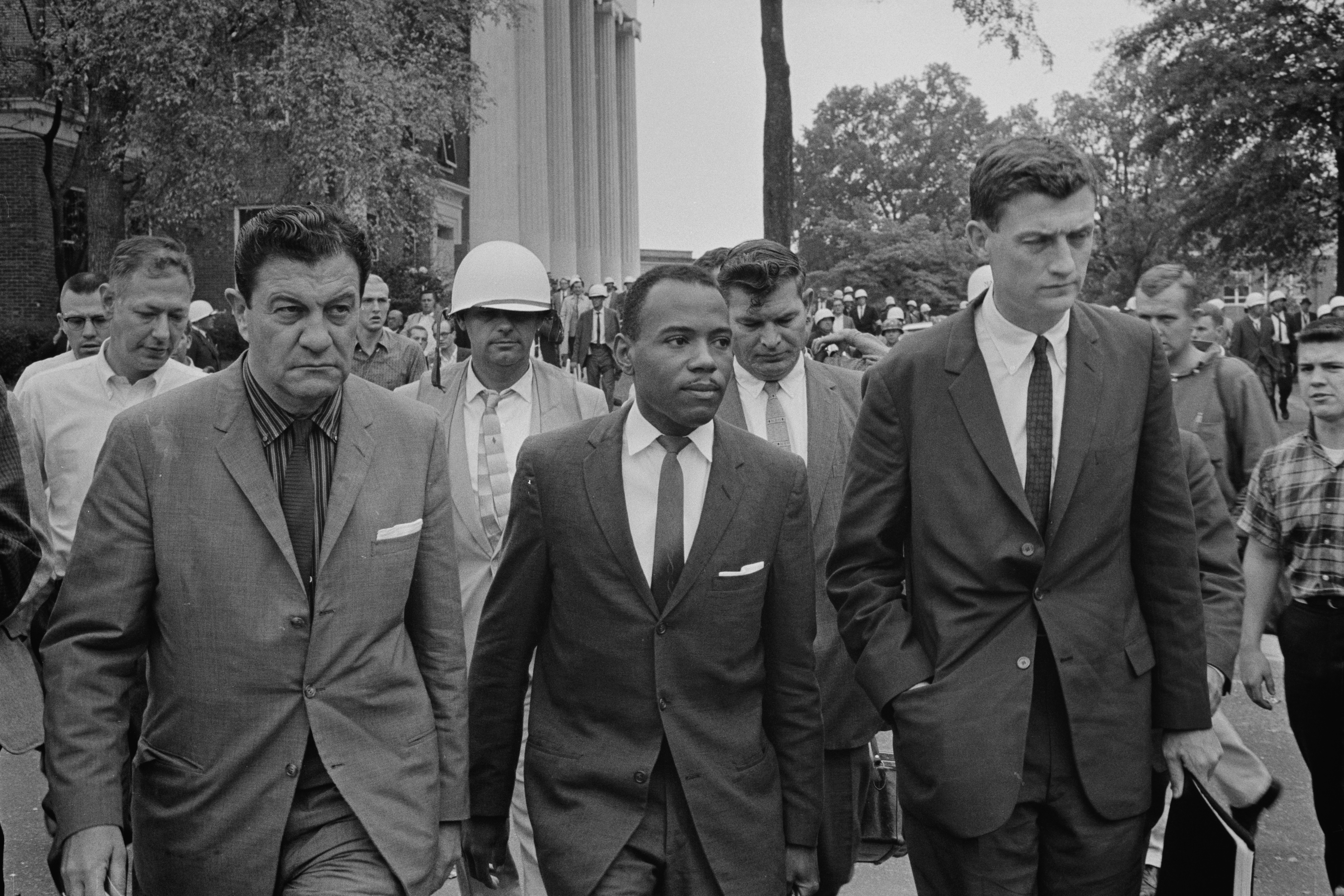
Doar (right) and U.S. marshals escorting James Meredith to class at the University of Mississippi

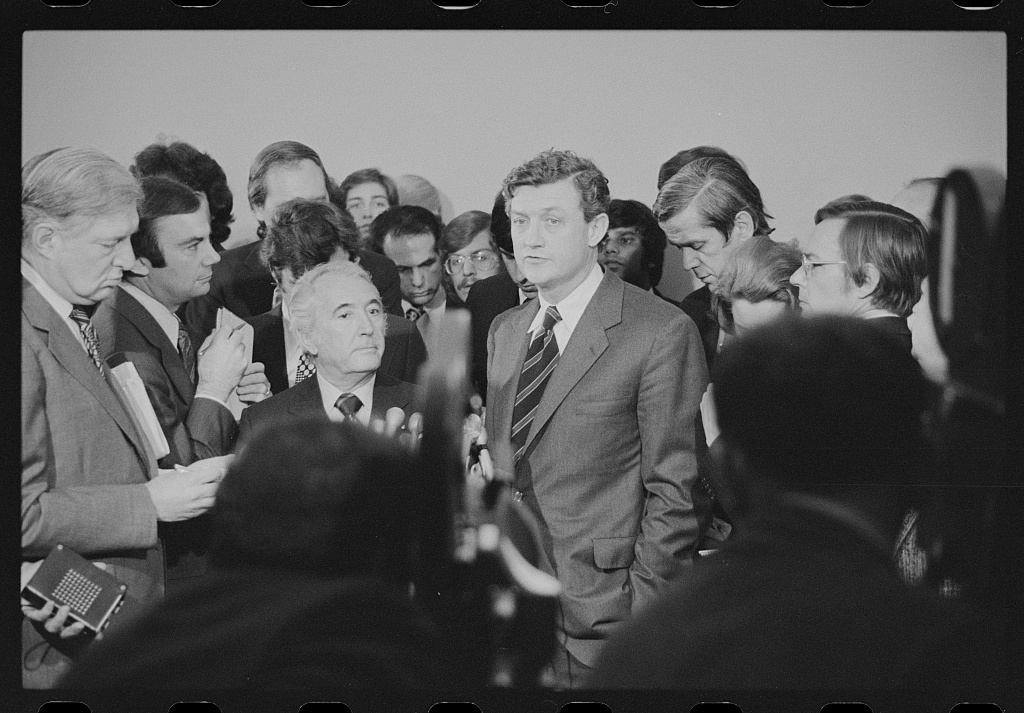
Doar (center-right) and Judiciary Committee Chairman Peter Rodino speaking with reporters during the Nixon impeachment inquiry

== Representation in film and television ==
- The 1988 film Mississippi Burning drew from the murders of the three civil rights workers.
- Episode from the Discovery Channel series, "US Marshals: Mission in Mississippi" (1997). Interview with Doar about his role in Justice Department effort to enroll James Meredith at University of Mississippi in 1962. Doar and Chief US Marshal James McShane were given the job of enrolling Meredith by Attorney General Robert Kennedy.
- In the 2014 film Selma, he is portrayed by Alessandro Nivola.

== Legacy and honors ==
- Doar was awarded the Presidential Medal of Freedom in 2012.
- In 2017, Doar's hometown of New Richmond dedicated the John Doar History Trail, celebrating his life with a series of panels placed along a path around the mill pond.
