= Impeachment process against Richard Nixon =

1973–1974 US charging of president

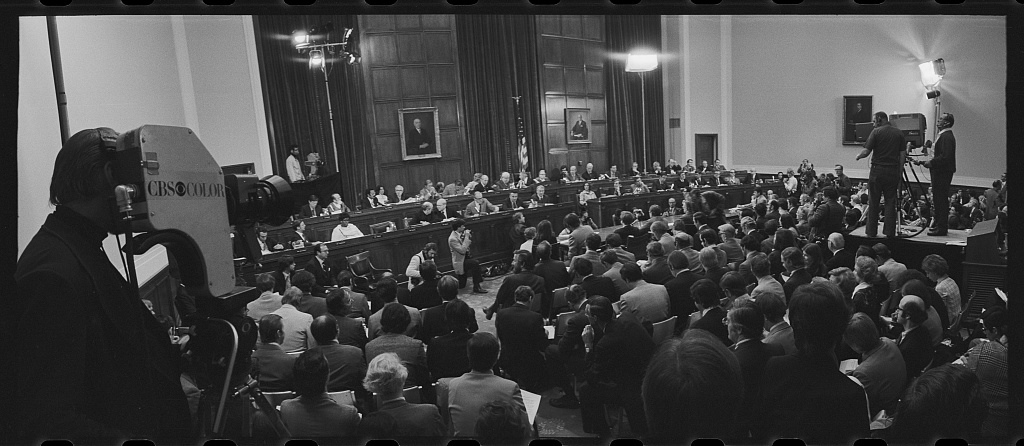
- First day of the House Judiciary Committee's formal impeachment hearings against President Nixon, May 9, 1974
- Accused: Richard Nixon, President of the United States
- Proponents: United States House Committee on the Judiciary
- Date: October 30, 1973 to August 20, 1974 (9 months and 3 weeks)
- Outcome: Resolution containing three articles of impeachment adopted July 30, 1974; the impeachment proceedings ended on August 20, 1974, without an impeachment vote, after President Nixon resigned from office.
- Charges: Adopted: obstruction of justice, abuse of power, contempt of Congress; Rejected: usurping congressional war powers, tax fraud

The impeachment process against President Richard Nixon was initiated by the United States House of Representatives on October 30, 1973, during the course of the Watergate scandal, when multiple resolutions calling for the impeachment of Nixon were introduced immediately following the series of high-level resignations and firings widely called the "Saturday Night Massacre". The House Committee on the Judiciary soon began an official investigation of the president's role in Watergate, and, in May 1974, commenced formal hearings on whether sufficient grounds existed to impeach Nixon of high crimes and misdemeanors under Article II, Section 4, of the United States Constitution. This investigation was undertaken one year after the United States Senate established the Select Committee on Presidential Campaign Activities to investigate the break-in at the Democratic National Committee headquarters at the Watergate office complex during the 1972 presidential election, and the Republican Nixon administration's attempted cover-up of its involvement; during those hearings the scope of the scandal became apparent and the existence of the Nixon White House tapes was revealed.

Following an April 1974 subpoena from the Judiciary Committee, edited transcripts of 42 taped White House conversations relevant to the Watergate cover-up were finally made public by Nixon. However, the committee pressed for the audio tapes themselves, and subsequently issued subpoenas for additional tapes, all of which Nixon had refused. That same month, Nixon also refused to comply with a subpoena from special prosecutor Leon Jaworski for 64 Watergate-related tapes. Ultimately, on July 24, 1974, the United States Supreme Court issued a unanimous decision against Nixon, which ordered him to comply. On May 9, 1974, formal hearings in the impeachment inquiry of Nixon began, culminating on July 27–30, 1974, when members of the Democratic-led Judiciary Committee eventually approved three articles of impeachment. These articles charged Nixon with: (1) obstruction of justice in attempting to impede the investigation of the Watergate break-in, protect those responsible, and conceal the existence of other illegal activities; (2) abuse of power by using the office of the presidency on multiple occasions, dating back to the first year of his administration (1969), to unlawfully use federal agencies, such as the Internal Revenue Service and the Federal Bureau of Investigation, as well as establishing a covert White House special investigative unit, to violate the constitutional rights of citizens and interfere with lawful investigations; and (3) contempt of Congress by refusing to comply with congressional subpoenas. These articles were reported to the House of Representatives for final action, with 7 of the committee's 17 Republicans joining all 21 of its Democrats in voting in favor of one or more of the articles. Two other articles were debated in committee but were rejected. Based on the strength of the evidence presented and the bipartisan support for the articles in committee, House leaders of both political parties concluded that Nixon's impeachment by the full House was a certainty if it reached the House floor for a final vote, and that his conviction in a Senate trial was a distinct possibility.

On August 5, 1974, Nixon released a transcript of one of the additional conversations to the public, known as the "smoking gun" tape, which made clear his complicity in the Watergate cover-up. This disclosure destroyed Nixon politically. His most loyal defenders in Congress announced they would vote to impeach and convict Nixon for obstructing justice. Republican congressional leaders met with Nixon and told him that his impeachment and removal were all but certain. Thereupon, Nixon gave up the struggle to remain in office, and resigned on August 9, 1974. Vice President Gerald Ford succeeded to the presidency in accordance with Section I of the Twenty-fifth Amendment. Although arrangements for a final House vote on the articles of impeachment and for a Senate trial were being made at the time, further formal action was rendered unnecessary by his resignation, so the House brought the impeachment process against him to an official close two weeks later.

Nixon was the first U.S. president to be the subject of an official impeachment inquiry in the House of Representatives since Andrew Johnson in 1868. (Note: Andrew Johnson was the only U.S. president prior to Richard Nixon to be the subject of a formal House of Representatives impeachment inquiry; however, five previous presidents—John Tyler, Andrew Johnson, Grover Cleveland, Herbert Hoover and Harry S. Truman—had proposed articles of impeachment filed against them in the House.) Two of Nixon's successors have undergone similar proceedings, (Note: The two U.S. presidents since Nixon who have been the subject of a formal House impeachment inquiry are: Bill Clinton, in 1998 (trial in 1999), and Donald Trump, in 2019 (trial in 2020), and again in 2021.) and both, like Johnson, were impeached but then acquitted at the consequent Senate trial. Thus, while Nixon himself was not impeached, the impeachment process against him is so far the only one that has brought about a president's departure from office (he resigned).

== Background ==
The Watergate scandal began with the June 17, 1972, break-in at the Democratic National Committee headquarters at the Watergate Office Building in Washington, D.C., and the Nixon administration's attempted cover-up of its involvement. In January 1973, the same month in which Richard Nixon began his second term, the burglars each went on trial separately before U.S. District Judge John Sirica; all pleaded or were found guilty. That February, the United States Senate voted to create a special investigative committee to look into the scandal. The resultant Senate Watergate hearings, led by Sam Ervin, commenced in May 1973. Broadcast "gavel-to-gavel" nationwide by PBS and (alternately) by the three U.S. commercial networks—ABC, CBS and NBC, the hearings aroused and held great public interest through that summer. Senators heard testimony that the president had approved plans to cover up administration involvement with the Watergate break-in, and learned of the existence of a voice-activated taping system in the Oval Office.

Separately, on May 25, 1973, Attorney General Elliot Richardson appointed Archibald Cox as special prosecutor for the federal investigation into possible Nixon administration ties to the Watergate burglary. When the existence of tape recorded White House conversations became known in July of that year, both Cox and the Senate Watergate Committee asked Judge Sirica to issue a subpoena for several "relevant and important" recordings and documents. The president, who denied prior knowledge of the Watergate burglary or participating in its cover-up, which he claimed to have been unaware of until earlier in 1973, refused to comply with the subpoenas, citing executive privilege and national security concerns. During an address to the nation on Watergate the following month, Nixon justified his refusal:

This principle of confidentiality of presidential conversations is at stake in the question of these tapes. I must and I shall oppose any efforts to destroy this principle, which is so vital to the conduct of this great office.

Nixon's adamant refusal to comply with the subpoenas for the tapes sparked a constitutional crisis between the White House and Congress and the special prosecutor. On August 9, the Senate committee filed suit in federal district court to force President Nixon to make the subpoenaed tapes available. Hoping to avoid making a ruling, the Court asked the parties to negotiate an out of court solution; their effort to find an acceptable compromise failed however, largely due to Nixon's intransigence. Nevertheless, Nixon soon began contemplating ways to accommodate Cox, the Senate Watergate committee, and Sirica after two polls showed that public opinion was solidly against him: 61 percent of those responding to a Gallup Poll said the president should release the subpoenaed tapes to the court; 54 percent of those responding to a Harris Poll said Congress would be justified in beginning impeachment proceedings against the president if he refused to obey a court order directing him to turn over the tapes.

In a 5–2 ruling on October 12, the appellate court upheld Sirica's subpoena. Weakened by the decision, the president, together with Chief of Staff Alexander Haig and Press Secretary Ron Ziegler, moved forward with a proposed compromise: the White House would prepare transcripts of the tapes, Senator John C. Stennis, a Democrat, and chairman of the Senate Armed Services Committee, would be asked to listen to the tapes himself and make a comparison between the transcripts and the tapes. His authenticated version would be submitted to the court. The White House also wanted to empower Stennis to paraphrase language that in its original form would, in his judgment, be embarrassing to the President, and wanted an assurance from Cox that no other tapes would be subpoenaed by his office. The administration's explanation was that Stennis would be sensitive to matters of national security contained within. However, as Stennis was hard-of-hearing and on heavy doses of medication since being mugged and shot earlier in the year, it is believed that the president did not want the tapes entered into the public record verbatim, because they contained recordings of him and others using coarse language and racial slurs, and making possibly incriminating statements. When the plan was presented to him, Cox categorically rejected it.

Afterward, on October 20, after being directed by the White House to make no further attempts to obtain tapes, notes or memoranda of presidential conversations, Cox held a news conference to state that he would continue pressing in court for the tapes, even if it meant asking that Nixon be held in contempt if the White House refused to turn them over. Nixon thereupon ordered that Cox be fired, precipitating the immediate departures of Attorney General Richardson and Deputy Attorney General William Ruckelshaus in what became known as the "Saturday Night Massacre."

== Early calls for impeachment ==
During the opening months of the 93rd Congress, multiple resolutions calling for a presidential impeachment inquiry were introduced in the House and referred to its Judiciary Committee. The committee began an examination of the charges under its general investigative authority. In February 1973, the House approved a resolution providing additional investigative authority that did not specifically mention impeachment.

The first resolution to directly call for President Nixon's impeachment was introduced on July 31, 1973, by Robert Drinan. (Note: Prior to the Watergate break-in, in May 1972, during the 92nd Congress, three Vietnam War-related impeachment resolutions were introduced in the House against President Nixon: a general resolution without specific charges, introduced by William Ryan, plus two identical four-count resolutions from John Conyers. These were referred to the House Judiciary Committee; no further action on the resolutions is recorded.) His resolution, which did not contain specific charges, was made in response to Nixon's clandestine authorization of the bombing of Cambodia, as well as his actions relative to the growing Watergate scandal. The resolution was effectively ignored by leaders of both parties. House Majority Leader Tip O'Neill later said,

Morally, Drinan had a good case. But politically, he damn near blew it. For if Drinan's resolution had come up for a vote at the time he filed it, it would have been overwhelmingly defeated—by something like 400 to 20. After that, with most of the members already on record as having voted once against impeachment, it would have been extremely difficult to get them to change their minds later on.

By September 1973, there was a sense that Nixon had regained some political strength, the American public had become burned out by the Watergate hearings, and Congress was not willing to undertake impeachment absent some major revelation from the White House tapes or some egregious new presidential action against the investigation. There was, nonetheless, a public appetite for information about impeachment, piqued by the legal maneuvering over the tapes. Accordingly, the Judiciary Committee prepared a 718-page book on the topic. Published in October 1973, it traces the origin of the impeachment power, cites all the instances in which that power had previously been used by Congress and gives a detailed description of Andrew Johnson's 1868 Senate impeachment trial.

== Preparation for impeachment inquiry ==
=== Push for investigation ===
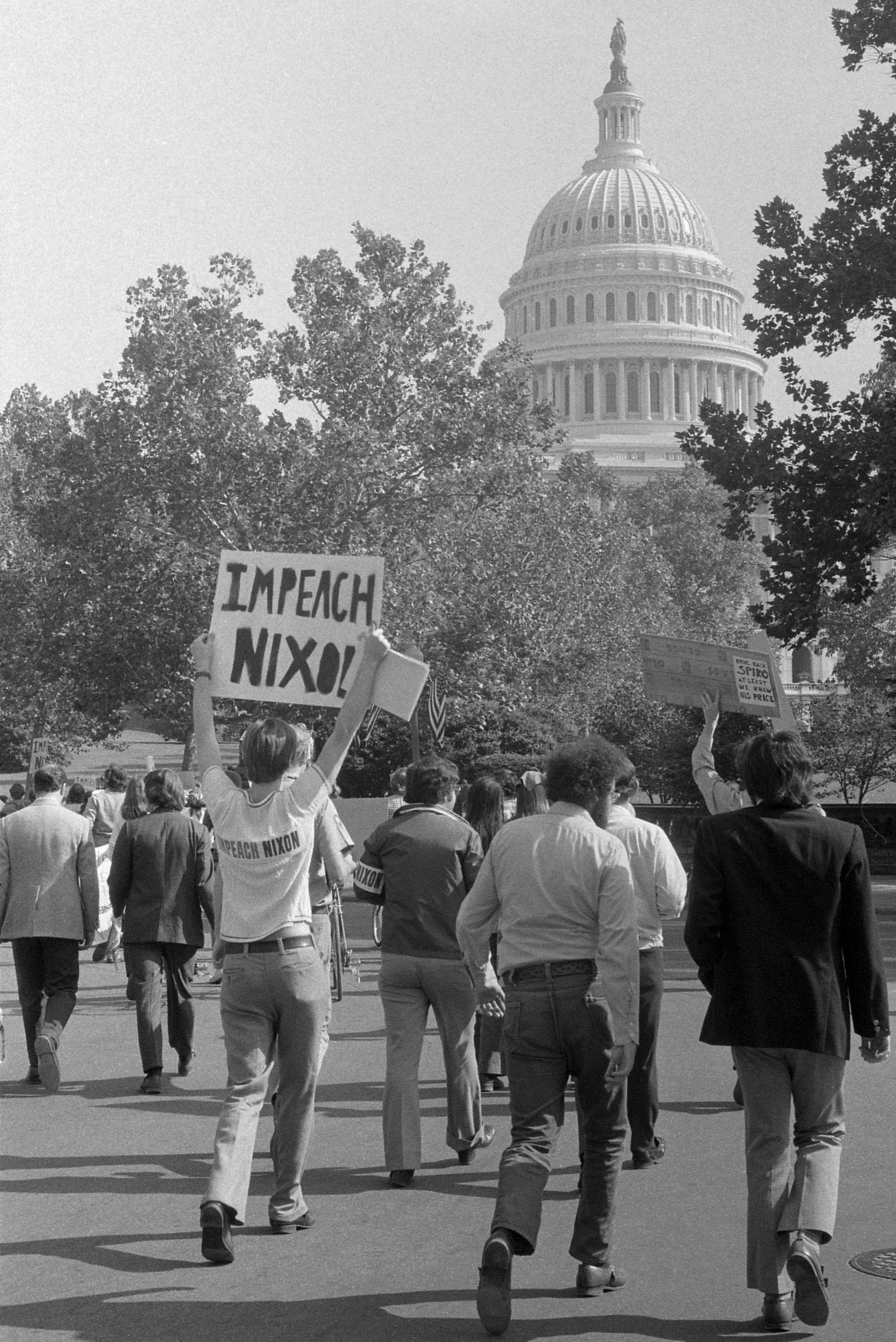
Demonstrators in Washington, D.C., demanding that Congress impeach President Nixon, following the "Saturday Night Massacre"

The October 20 "Saturday Night Massacre" rapidly became a public relations disaster for Nixon. Shortly after the White House announced the firing and the resignations, NBC News anchor John Chancellor interrupted the network's prime time programming with a dire message: "The country tonight is in the midst of what may be the most serious constitutional crisis in its history." The next day, The New York Times declared: "The nation is in the hands of a president overcome with dictatorial misconceptions of his constitutional authority." The White House and congressional offices were deluged with a record shattering 450,000 telegrams, most demanding Nixon's impeachment; hundreds of demonstrators gathered outside the White House, loudly demanding the same.

Nixon's firing of Archibald Cox triggered an uproar in Congress as well. Beginning on October 23, outraged House Democrats introduced 22 separate impeachment-related resolutions, variously calling for impeachment or an impeachment investigation or, at least, a new special prosecutor. Additionally, Nixon was the subject of several resolutions that either sought to censure him or that called for him to resign. Speaker of the House Carl Albert referred the various resolutions to the Judiciary Committee.

Further, Nixon's actions were widely criticized by Republican congressional leaders, who demanded "full and complete disclosure" to investigators of all subpoenaed Watergate materials as well as the appointment of a new special prosecutor. That same day, Nixon agreed to turn the subpoenaed tapes over to Judge Sirica. (Note: On November 21, 1973, special White House counsel for Watergate matters Fred Buzhardt informed Judge John Sirica that one of the tapes contained an 18½-minute erased gap. The White House also reported that two other tapes were missing.) The president also reversed course on his decision to abolish the office of the special prosecutor, which he had done when he fired Cox. One week later, Leon Jaworski was appointed to the post by the acting attorney general, Robert Bork.

Speaker Albert, who at the time was first in the presidential line of succession, following the resignation of Vice President Spiro Agnew on October 10, cautioned the committee against taking impulsive or ill-considered action on impeachment; he also called on Congress to take swift action on the nomination of Gerald Ford to fill the vice presidential vacancy. (Note: President Nixon nominated House Minority Leader Gerald Ford to succeed Vice President Spiro Agnew on October 12, 1973, under terms of the Twenty-fifth Amendment, Section 2. The Senate voted 92 to 3 to confirm Ford's nomination on November 27, 1973, and the House voted to confirm him on December 6, 1973, by a vote of 387 to 35.) During the vacancy, Albert came under increasing pressure from various liberal House Democrats, such as Bella Abzug, to do the opposite. By using his political power to delay Ford's confirmation as vice president and expedite Nixon's impeachment and removal from office, Albert would become acting president and the Democratic Party would assume control of the executive branch without having to win an election. He rejected that course of action, however, though he did develop a 19-page contingency plan for a presidential transition, just in case. Likewise, the Judiciary Committee Chairman Peter W. Rodino refused to be pressured, telling the committee that the Ford nomination would not be held "hostage" until the impeachment inquiry was completed.

=== Start of Judiciary Committee investigation ===
The Judiciary Committee voted on October 30, to begin consideration of possible impeachment of President Nixon by a 21–17 party-line vote, with all the committee's Democrats voting yes and all Republicans voting no, and took up the matter in earnest that December, upon completing the Ford confirmation hearings. The committee was led by Rodino, who, until assuming its chairmanship in January 1973, had kept a low profile in Congress. Now front and center in the political limelight, he told a reporter: "If fate had been looking for one of the powerhouses of Congress, it wouldn't have picked me." Those wishing to expedite the impeachment were critical of the slowness of running the process through the Judiciary Committee and of Rodino's leadership abilities. But Albert, who thought Rodino and his committee had done a fair and thorough job during the Ford hearings, was content to let the committee handle the process.

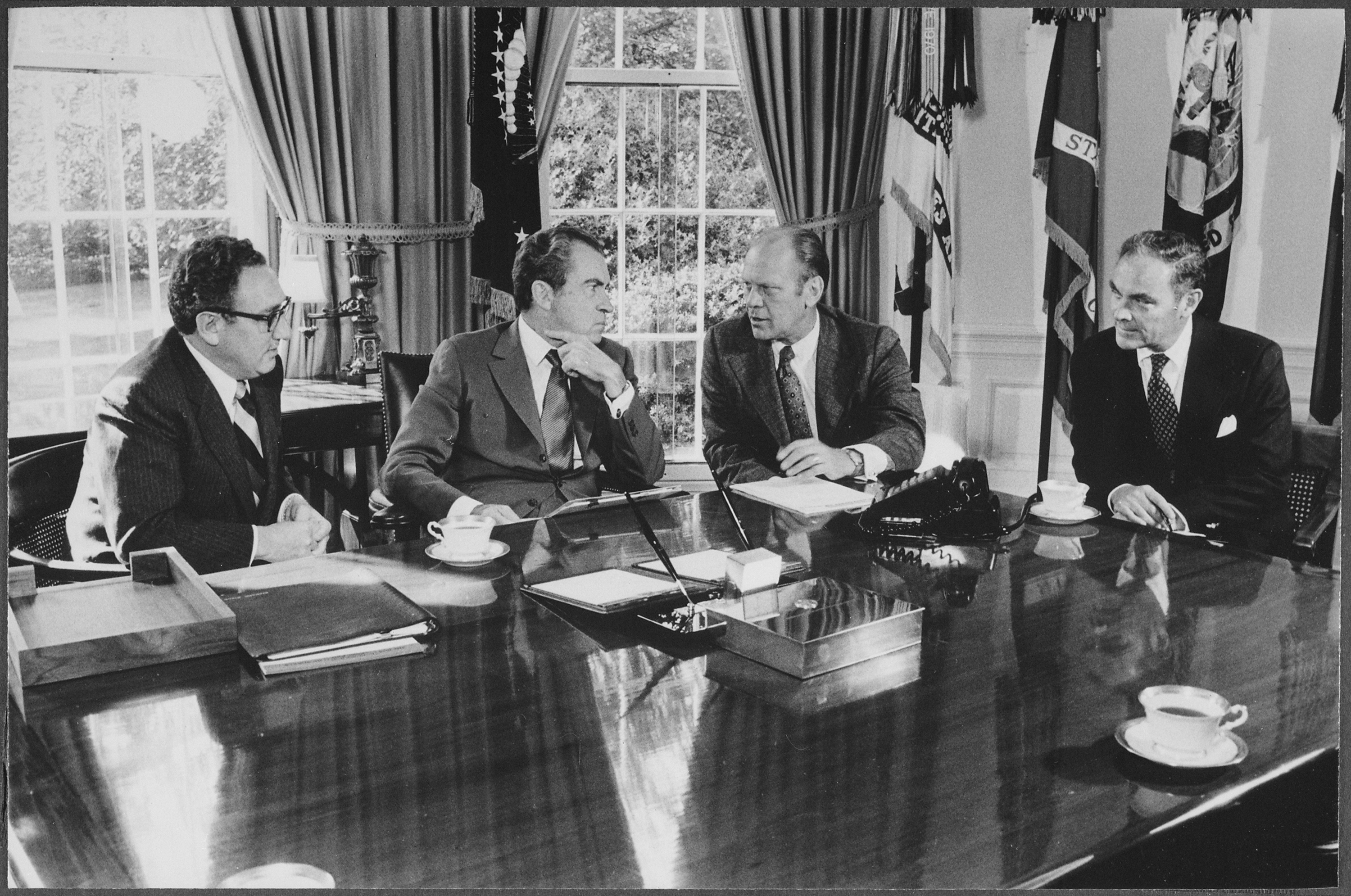
Secretary of State Kissinger, President Nixon, vice-presidential nominee Ford, and White House Chief of Staff Haig in the Oval Office, October 1973

On November 4, 1973, Senator Edward Brooke became the first congressional Republican to publicly urge President Nixon to resign. That same week, several newspapers, including The Atlanta Journal, The Denver Post, The Detroit News, and The New York Times, published editorials also urging him to resign. Time magazine, in its first editorial in 50 years of publication, did so as well, declaring that the president "[had] irredeemably lost his moral authority" to govern effectively, and that Nixon "and the nation [had] passed a tragic point of no return." Later in November, the ACLU, which two months earlier had become the first national organization to publicly call for the president's impeachment and removal, released a 56‐page handbook detailing "17 things citizens could do to bring about the impeachment of President Nixon."

With momentum on impeachment quickly building in Congress, Nixon held a live one-hour televised press conference on November 17 to defend himself. In addition to Watergate-related matters, the president addressed a variety of topics, including the nation's energy crisis and his personal finances. In response to a question concerning allegations of fraud on his tax returns, he stated categorically: "People have got to know whether or not their president is a crook. Well, I am not a crook."

Over the next two months, as the impeachment investigations began, there was speculation in Washington that Nixon might resign. Despite several attempts to do so, Nixon had not been able to put Watergate behind him, and the momentum of events was against him. In the climate of anxiety and skepticism engendered by the Watergate scandal, the president's health and morale, as well as the motives behind his words and actions became the subject of much speculation. Rumors persisted that he was in poor mental and physical shape, and the White House became ultra-sensitive to any assessment of the president's public behavior that might cast doubt on his ability to govern.

==== Assembling of investigation staff ====
Meanwhile, to ensure a "fair and principled inquiry" by keeping the impeachment process out of the hands of overzealous liberals, (Note: Seven liberal Democrats were identified by The New York Times as "impeachment zealots", "Nixon antagonists" eager to find grounds upon which to impeach the president: Jack Brooks, Robert Kastenmeier, Don Edwards, John Conyers, Jerome Waldie, Robert Drinan and Charles Rangel.) Rodino, with the support of the committee's ranking minority member Edward Hutchinson, decided to hire an independent lead special counsel for the inquiry whom the committee would oversee. John Doar, formerly a civil rights attorney in the Kennedy and Johnson administrations, was hired for the position in December 1973. A registered Republican, he shared with Rodino a view that the Senate hearings had gone overboard with leaked revelations and witnesses compelled to testify under immunity grants; they were determined to do things in a more thorough and objective process. He also shared Rodino's view that the process would be as even-handed as possible, and was given the freedom to hire his own inquiry staff, separate from that handling regular Committee business. (Note: The decision to bypass the existing committee structure and the members' staff, notes historian Stanley Kutler, "resulted in unnecessary rivalries and eventually colored the relationship between Doar and the congressmen.")

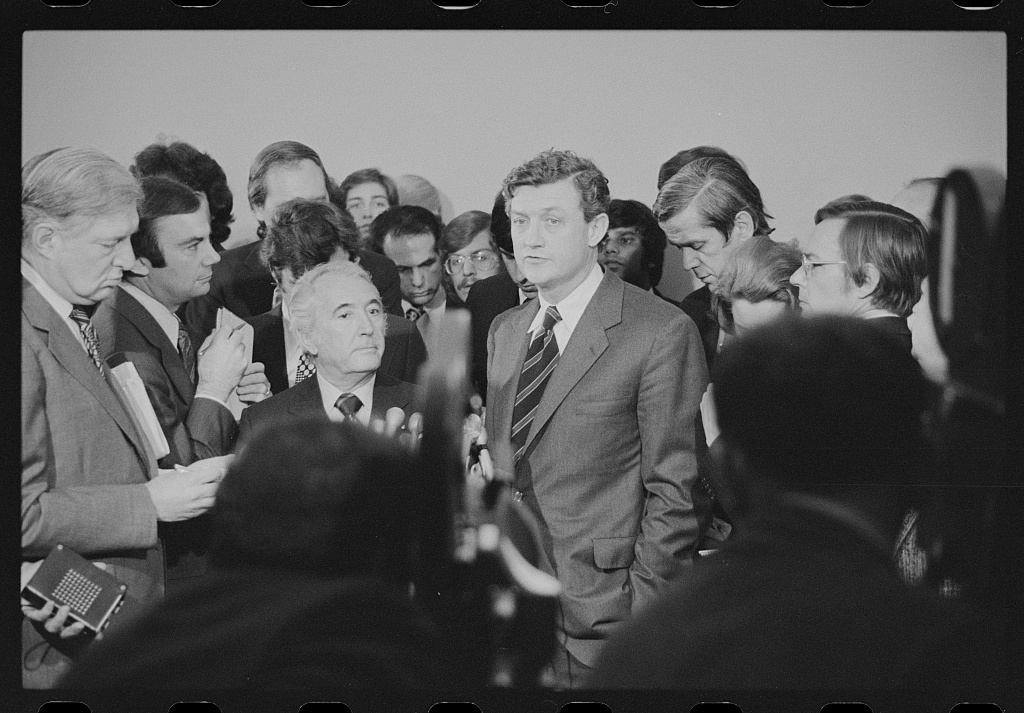
Judiciary Committee Chairman Rodino (center-left) and Special Counsel Doar speaking with reporters, January 24, 1974

While assembling his team, Doar began meticulously reviewing the Watergate grand jury testimony, Senate Watergate committee files and the earlier-released taped White House conversations. He supervised a staff which in due course grew to 100 people, including some 43 attorneys, of whom four were black and two were women. Nearly early all were recent (1968 or after) law school graduates. Among them was Bill Weld, who would go on to become the governor of Massachusetts. He worked on researching case law regarding what constituted grounds for presidential impeachment, and whether impoundment of appropriated funds was an impeachable offense. Another staff member was Hillary Rodham, not yet married to Bill Clinton, who would go on to become first lady of the United States, U.S. Senator, and U.S. Secretary of State. She helped research procedures of impeachment, and like Weld, the historical grounds and standards for impeachment. She also worked on a task force led by Evan A. Davis, that gathered and organized the facts pertaining to the Watergate break-in and cover-up by: reading through earlier Senate Watergate Committee testimony; examining the various documents and tape recordings released by Nixon in April 1974; and interviewing witnesses.

Albert E. Jenner Jr., who had previously served as assistant counsel to the Warren Commission investigating the assassination of President Kennedy, was named in January 1974 as senior counsel on the inquiry staff for the Republican minority on the Judiciary Committee, and Sam Garrison, who previously had been staff counsel and legislative liaison to Vice President Agnew, was named deputy counsel. Additionally, Nixon shuffled his legal team, and in January 1974, James D. St. Clair, a Boston lawyer, supplanted Charles Wright as the president's lead attorney. At its height his legal team employed 15 lawyers. St. Clair's defense was centered around the notion that while Nixon had made a number of statements that looked bad, he had committed no crimes. He also stated on numerous occasions during the proceedings, in explanation of his role: "I don't represent Mr. Nixon personally. I represent him in his capacity as president."

As the Judiciary Committee prepared to begin a formal impeachment inquiry, the president tried once more to contain the situation. At the conclusion of his 1974 State of the Union Address on January 30, Nixon asked for an expeditious resolution to any impeachment proceedings against him, so the government could function fully effectively again. He told Congress directly that "one year of Watergate is enough" and asserted that he had no "intention whatever" of resigning.

== Inquiry staff investigation ==
On February 6, 1974, the House Judiciary Committee was authorized to launch a formal impeachment inquiry against the president. The House approved the resolution 410–4. Voting against authorizing the inquiry were Republicans Benjamin B. Blackburn, Earl Landgrebe, Carlos Moorhead and Dave Treen. The vote, which was not a test of impeachment sentiment, validated the investigation begun by the committee the previous October. During the debate over this measure, Chairman Rodino said: "Whatever the result, whatever we learn or conclude, let us now proceed with such care and decency and thoroughness and honor that the vast majority of the American people, and their children after them, will say: "This was the right course. There was no other way."" House Minority Leader John Jacob Rhodes said Rodino's vow to conduct the inquiry fairly and within a short amount of time was "good with me."

The first task Doar assigned to the attorneys on the inquiry staff was to examine the constitutional and legal questions related to impeachment and to ascertain what constituted "high crimes and misdemeanors" – one of the grounds stated in Article II, Section 4 of the Constitution for impeachment of a federal official. This was a necessary first step as it had been over a century since the only prior American presidential impeachment, that of Andrew Johnson in 1868, and Judiciary Committee members desired guidance on the history, standards, and process of impeachment. Moreover, it had been nearly 40 years since the committee had even initiated an impeachment inquiry, not since 1936 against U.S. District Judge Halsted Ritter. Impeachment staff Senior Associate Special Counsel Joseph A. Woods Jr. supervised the staff's constitutional and legal research.

As a result of an in-depth study of how the constitutional language about impeachment came to be adopted during the 1787 Constitutional Convention and of the long history of British impeachment cases, the staff produced a guide for the Judiciary Committee, a 64-page report, entitled "Constitutional Grounds for Presidential Impeachment." A key determination made in the report was that there did not need to be a criminal act on the part of the president to justify impeachment. It stated: "The Framers did not write a fixed standard. Instead they adopted from English history a standard sufficiently general and flexible to meet future circumstances and events, the nature and character of which they could not foresee." It further concluded that impeachable offenses could fall into three categories: "exceeding the powers of the office in derogation of those of another branch of government," "behaving in a manner grossly incompatible with the proper functions and purpose of the office," and "employing the power of the office for an improper purpose or personal gain."

The document became a focal point of the Judiciary Committee's impeachment inquiry. (Note: The 1974 Constitutional Grounds for Presidential Impeachment has subsequently been used as a guidebook during two House presidential impeachment inquiries: against Bill Clinton in 1998 and against Donald Trump in 2019.) The White House was quick to reject the report's central conclusion, asserting that only criminal offenses of "a very serious nature" are grounds for impeaching the president. When the committee's anti-impeachment Republicans ordered a separate report prepared, one more in line with the White House view, Albert Jenner, who disagreed with that position, delayed completing the request. The assignment was carried out by Sam Garrison. Following this event there would be ongoing tension between the two men, which would color their respective relationships with members of the committee.

Overseeing the factual investigations were senior associate special counsels Richard Cates and Bernard Nussbaum. Under their guidance, inquiry staff members, working in teams, endeavored to collect and assemble factual information and evidence relevant to the various allegations made against Nixon. Major investigations were conducted into: his complicity in covering up the Watergate burglary; his creation of the covert White House special investigative unit and that unit's subsequent illegal activities; and his personal finances since entering office, to determine whether he had committed tax fraud. Among the dozens of other matters considered by the investigators were allegations that International Telephone and Telegraph and American Milk Producers benefited politically from contributions to Nixon's 1968 presidential campaign, and charges that the Nixon administration had interfered with the investigation by the Securities and Exchange Commission of Robert Vesco, who had donated $200,000 in 1972 to the Committee to Re-Elect the President. The case was put together on more than 500,000 five-by-seven-inch note cards that were cross-indexed against each other. Mastering this filing system became a requirement of anyone working on the inquiry.

A constant worry among impeachment inquiry staff leaders was that developments from their research, discussions and preliminary conclusions would leak to the press. To minimize leaks, Doar established strict rules of conduct that included this directive: "The staff of the impeachment inquiry shall not discuss with anyone outside the staff either the substance or procedure of their work or that of the committee." Security guards patrolled the halls of the House Annex-1 building in which a myriad of lawyers, investigators, clerks, and stenographers worked in rooms with closed blinds. Doar in particular had the attorneys on the inquiry working on isolated areas so that only a few of the senior counsels knew the big picture. In a March 9, 1974, story Bill Kovach wrote in The New York Times that staff members worked "under security conditions that suggest a classified defense project." Opinions differ, however, as to how successful these efforts were at preventing leaks. Later, in 2005, Doar said of Rodino:

He was able to impose discipline on the staff. He insisted that there be no leaks to the press. There were no leaks to the press. He insisted that it be bipartisan, it not be partisan. There was no partisanship on the staff. In fact, it was remarkably non-partisan. And that is the result of good leadership. And although Congressman Rodino was a quiet man, he had the knack of leading, of managing, and he did it very well, in my opinion.

On March 1, 1974, the federal district court grand jury that had been impaneled in July 1972 to investigate the Watergate break-in handed up indictments against seven Nixon advisers and aides, including H. R. Haldeman, John Ehrlichman, and John N. Mitchell. As Watergate Special Prosecutor Leon Jaworski advised the grand jury that in his opinion the Constitution prohibited the indictment of an incumbent president, thus making the House Judiciary Committee the constitutionally appropriate body under the Constitution for examining evidence relating to the president's role in the Watergate conspiracy, jurors recommended that the material supporting the criminal case against him be turned over to the committee. The grand jury, it was disclosed later, had named Nixon as an unindicted co-conspirator in a sealed addendum to the other indictments.

The documentation consisted of a 55-page index that enumerated testimony, tapes, and other items of evidence, but omitted legal analysis and offered no conclusions regarding whether there were impeachable actions in Nixon's behaviors. The grand jury action, an unprecedented move that enabled Jaworski to get around the legal restrictions preventing him from handing the evidence directly to Congress, was challenged in federal court, but permitted to proceed under seal. (Note: Leon Jaworski's report remained sealed until October 11, 2018, when a federal judge ordered its release with limited redactions.) Known collectively as the "Road Map," the evidence furnished the Judiciary Committee with "the sum total of the evidence that we had assembled up to that point," Jaworski later said.

Buffeted by allegations that, since taking office, Nixon had greatly underpaid what he owed the IRS in taxes, the president had agreed in December 1973 to publicly release his returns covering the years 1969 through 1972. He also asked Congress' Joint Committee on Taxation to examine his personal finances. The committee's report, issued April 3, 1974, found several problems with Nixon's returns, and said he owed $476,431 including interest for unpaid taxes over four years. Doar was quick to state that an examination of whether fraud was involved in the preparation of the tax returns and the claiming of certain large deductions was clearly within the scope of the impeachment inquiry.

From the beginning, Rodino and Doar understood that their ability to build a case against Nixon was dependent upon the president's willingness to comply with their requests for material. Though the documentation received from the grand jury contained actionable information, they both concluded more information was needed. Their case was still circumstantial, consisting mostly of broad practices of abuse on the part of the administration, and lacked direct evidence proving that the president had knowledge of or was a participant in the Watergate conspiracy; for this, they needed the tapes, and to receive them they would need Nixon's cooperation.

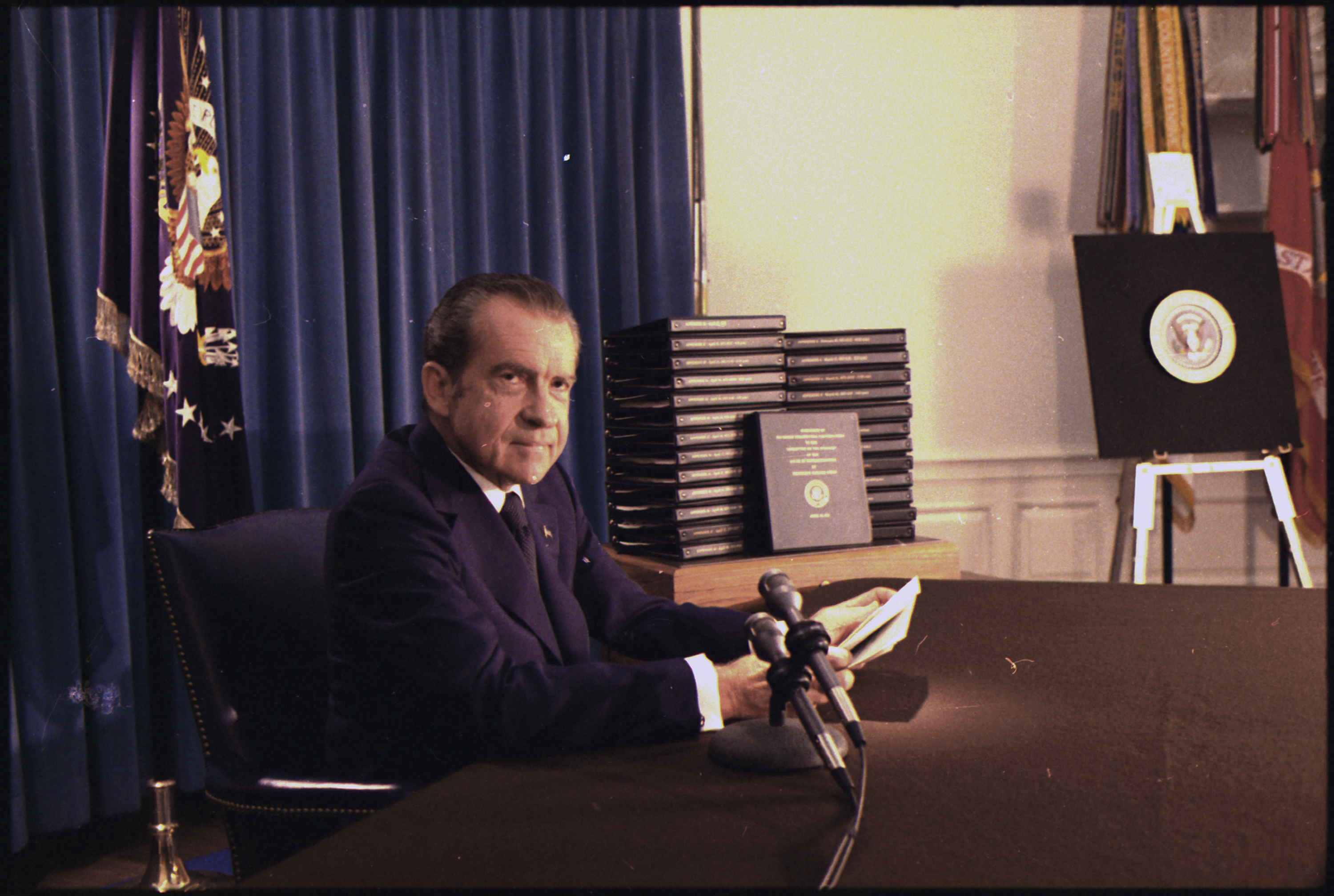
President Nixon just prior to announcing his intention to release edited transcripts of the subpoenaed White House tapes, April 29, 1974

On April 11, 1974, by a 33–3 vote, the Judiciary Committee subpoenaed 42 White House tapes of pertinent conversations. A week later, Jaworski obtained a subpoena from Judge Sirica ordering Nixon to release 64 additional recordings in connection with his case. Nixon initially wanted to refuse both requests completely, but James St. Clair, along with Dean Burch, the counselor to the president, and others, advised him that such a stance would be untenable politically. Consequently, Nixon agreed that transcripts of the tapes requested by the Judiciary Committee, with certain passages edited or removed, would be released, but that Jaworski's request for tapes and other documents would be denied. Jaworski could be stonewalled for months, the president reasoned, whereas the committee could not. Nixon announced this decision to a national television audience on April 29. Upon inspecting the transcripts, Nixon, shocked by several profanity-laced discussions among his inner circle, ordered that every use of profanity be replaced by "EXPLETIVE DELETED."

The next day, April 30, some 1,250 pages of transcripts, edited by the president and his aides to remove portions deemed "not relevant" to the Watergate investigation, were made public. Of the transcripts released, Nixon said: "They include all the relevant portions of all of the subpoenaed conversations that were recorded—that is, all portions that relate to the question of what I knew about Watergate or the cover-up and what I did about it." He further claimed that, notwithstanding some ambiguous passages, the transcripts as a whole would "tell it all" and vindicate his narrative of his actions. One week later, St. Clair announced that Nixon would not be providing any more tapes to either the Judiciary Committee or the special prosecutor.

The released transcripts quickly dominated the news and even the popular culture landscape. A few newspapers printed the transcripts in full, and two quickly produced paperback books containing them, resulting in sales of more than a million copies. Also, the phrase "expletive deleted" became a widely used catchphrase. More broadly, their release marked a turning point in support for the president, with the crudity of what was revealed, and of what was masked by the repeated phrase expletive deleted, beginning an erosion of support among Republicans.

There were six special House elections in 1974 to fill vacant seats. Held between February and June, they provided the first broad test of public sentiment regarding the scandal-plagued Nixon administration. Democrats won five of the elections, each in a district previously represented by a Republican. One Democratic gain was Michigan's 5th district, which Gerald Ford had long held before becoming vice president. Another was Michigan's 8th district, which had not elected a Democrat to Congress in more than 40 years. The message for the president and the Republican Party in general was ominous, and according to The Almanac of American Politics, this streak of Democratic victories "helped convince Republicans that Nixon needed to resign."

== Judiciary Committee hearings ==
The House Judiciary Committee on May 9, 1974, began formal hearings on the impeachment of President Nixon. The initial 20 minutes of that day's proceedings were broadcast on the major U.S. television networks, after which the committee met for 10 weeks in closed sessions to receive evidence, including the confidential report from the Watergate grand jury, and to hear witnesses out of the public eye. During an interview several days later with columnist James J. Kilpatrick, President Nixon stated unequivocally that he would not resign. Doing so, he said, "knowing that I am not guilty of any offense under the Constitution that is called an impeachable offense," would set a bad precedent for future presidents.

=== Receiving evidence ===
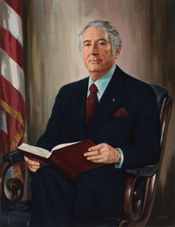
Peter Rodino, chairman of the House Judiciary Committee

During the first phase of the hearings, May 9 – June 21, the committee's impeachment inquiry staff reported their accumulated evidence on the various charges against the president. First, detailed evidence was presented showing how President Nixon had obstructed justice and abused presidential power during the investigation of the Watergate break-in. The staff then turned the committee's attention to evidence that the money given to the Nixon presidential campaign by International Telephone and Telegraph and American Milk Producers contravened campaign finance laws. Afterwards, the committee heard evidence concerning various other acts of alleged wrongdoing on Nixon's part, including, the unconstitutional impoundment of federal funds appropriated for domestic programs (about $18 billion in fiscal year 1973), violations of the Constitution's Domestic Emoluments Clause (Article II, Clause 7) and tax fraud.

In considering whether any one of the various allegations made against the president constituted an impeachable offense, the committee focused foremost on Article II, Section 4 of the Constitution, which specifies the grounds on which a president can be impeached: "treason, bribery, and other high Crimes and Misdemeanors." During the course of the hearings there was fervent debate about the nature of an impeachable offense under Article II, whether only criminally indictable offenses qualified as "high crimes and misdemeanors" or whether the definition was broader. Republicans on the committee maintained that a president could "be impeached only for committing a serious felony," while Democrats asserted that a president could "be impeached for severe violations of public trust that are not inherently criminal."

As the committee began examining the accumulated evidence it concluded that Nixon's edited transcripts did not comply with the terms of the earlier April subpoena. Two subpoenas were then issued on May 15 for the tape recordings of 11 conversations believed to concern the Watergate case, and diaries of Nixon's White House meetings during an eight‐month period in 1972 and 1973. Nixon, filled with indignation by "the continued succession of demands for additional presidential conversations," refused to comply, stating in a letter to Chairman Rodino that "he had already submitted all material pertinent to his role in the Watergate case." Nixon further declared that he would likewise reject any future subpoenas. This refusal later became the basis for the committee's third article of impeachment.

On May 30 the committee responded in a stern letter, again informing the president that it was not within his power to decide what evidence should be presented. Issued by a vote of 28–10, the letter also warned the president that his continued refusal might lead committee members to draw "adverse inferences" concerning the substance of the materials (that is, whether they contained incriminating evidence), and that the noncompliance itself might constitute grounds for impeachment. Eight Republicans joined the committee Democrats in approving the letter. The committee then approved a third subpoena for Watergate-related material, asking the White House for tapes of 45 conversations and for material from certain White House files related to the break-in and cover-up; only Republican Edward Hutchinson voted against issuing the subpoena. At the close of the first phase of the hearings, the committee, on June 24, issued four more subpoenas for additional White House tapes and materials related to a variety of issues of concern.

Next, on June 27, the president's counsel, James St. Clair, opened President Nixon's impeachment defense before the House Judiciary Committee. In Nixon's defense St. Clair argued that the president could be impeached only on solid proof of "great offenses committed against the government," not simply "maladministration." During this phase of the hearings, Republican committee members and St. Clair were permitted to name witnesses they wanted to hear from and devise subpoenas they wanted issued, but any such requests had to be approved by the full committee, meaning the majority had an ability to block said requests if they wanted. After a long and contentious debate, the committee agreed to hear five such witnesses in closed session: John Dean (former White House counsel), Frederick LaRue (a former White House and Nixon re-election campaign aide), Herbert W. Kalmbach (Nixon's former personal lawyer), Alexander Butterfield (former Nixon deputy assistant), and Assistant U.S. Attorney General Henry E. Petersen.

All through the hearings, President Nixon attempted to preserve his support in the House by wooing senior figures there, including some conservative Democrats, by inviting them to White House functions or evening cruises on the presidential yacht USS Sequoia. At the same time, statements from White House officials grew increasingly more scathing, the overall impeachment inquiry was derided as a "partisan witch hunt" and the committee's proceedings derided as "a kangaroo court."

Additionally, finding himself increasingly paralyzed on the domestic front by Watergate, Nixon purposefully showcased his foreign affairs acumen by traveling to the Middle East, to Brussels for a NATO summit, and to the Soviet Union in June 1974. In Egypt he met with President Anwar Sadat, and was cheered by millions as a result of Secretary of State Henry Kissinger's shuttle diplomacy earlier that year. Then, in the Soviet Union, he and General Secretary Leonid Brezhnev signed the Threshold Test Ban Treaty. The White House worked to portray these visits, and the president himself, as vital to peace and prosperity in that part of the world. Unknown to the public at the time, Nixon was suffering a potentially fatal case of phlebitis. White House doctors reportedly tried to persuade Nixon to forego the trip, but he insisted; there was reportedly speculation among the president's security detail that he was deliberately courting death by insisting on going, believing that dramatic end preferable to suffering further Watergate troubles and possible impeachment.

=== Releasing evidence to public ===
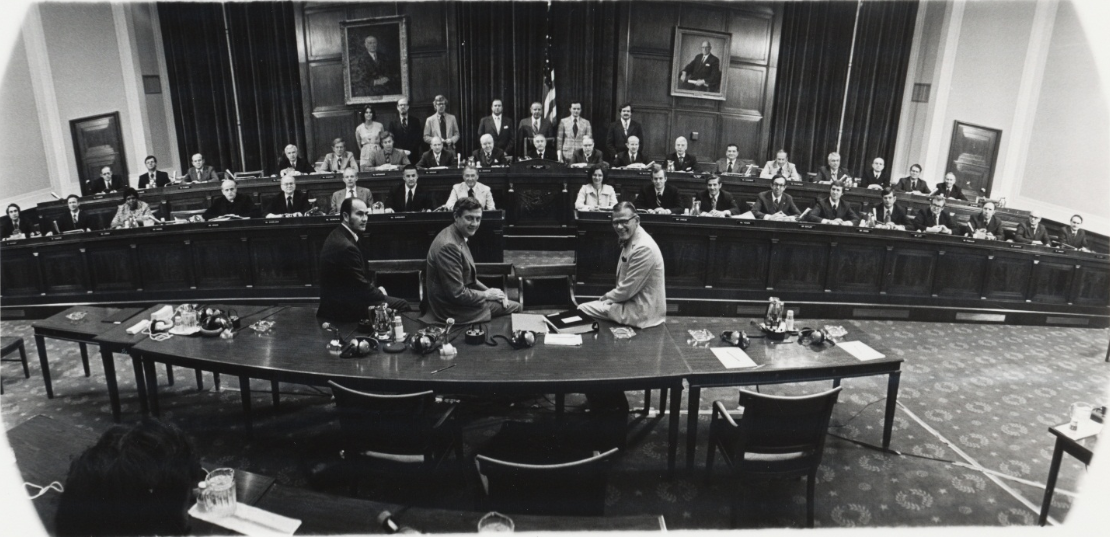
Members and staff of the House Judiciary Committee in 1974

On July 9, the Judiciary Committee released its own version of eight of the White House tapes of which Nixon had previously issued his own transcript. The committee transcripts benefited from superior playback equipment, which restored some of the potentially damaging statements that Nixon staffers had removed or heard differently. This was followed three days later by the committee's release of its accumulated evidence, which ran to 4,133 pages in all—3,891 pages assembled by the impeachment inquiry staff, as well as a 242-page rebuttal by James St. Clair, but contained neither commentary nor conclusions from the committee. Afterward St. Clair acknowledged for the first time publicly that a committee vote in favor of impeachment was likely, but White House Press Secretary Ron Ziegler said the president remained confident that the full House would not impeach.

Ten days after arguing the case of United States v. Nixon before the U.S. Supreme Court, July 18, 1974, St. Clair presented his final argument against impeaching the president to the Judiciary Committee. A vote to impeach could be justified only by "clear and convincing" evidence, he told the committee, "because anything less than that, in my view, is going to result in recrimination, bitterness and divisiveness among the people." He then attempted to refute the charges related to Nixon's involvement in the Watergate cover-up, and also outlined the president's position on the various other issues brought before the committee by the inquiry staff. In closing St. Clair said, "in light of the complete absence of any conclusive evidence demonstrating Presidential wrongdoings sufficient to justify the grave action of impeachment, the committee must conclude that a recommendation of impeachment is not justified."

For his part, Doar, who had heretofore maintained a neutral stance on impeachment, painted a picture for the committee of a president who by his actions had attempted to subvert the Constitution. Speaking about the rule of law and presidential obligations and about the evidence, he made the case for articles of impeachment against on charges of: obstruction of justice, abuse of power for political purposes, defying Judiciary Committee subpoenas, and tax evasion. "Reasonable men acting reasonably," he said, "would find the president guilty" of misusing the power of his office. Afterward, Albert Jenner, the impeachment inquiry committee's chief minority counsel, said he "agreed with every word" Doar had spoken. Infuriated, committee Republicans sidelined Jenner on July 22, in favor of assistant minority counsel Sam Garrison.

A Harris Poll was released in mid-July which showed that 53 percent of Americans supported Nixon's impeachment by the House. That same poll showed that 47 percent thought he should be convicted in a Senate trial and removed from office, and 34 percent thought he should be acquitted (19 percent were undecided). A Gallup Poll, released July 25, revealed that Nixon's overall job approval rating had slipped to a new low point of 24 percent, down considerably from its pre-Watergate hearings peak of 67 percent at the end of January 1973 (immediately after announcing the Paris Peace Accords).

=== United States v. Nixon ruling ===
In a much-anticipated landmark ruling on July 24, 1974, the U.S. Supreme Court ordered President Nixon to release all White House tapes, not just selected transcripts, pertinent to the Watergate investigation. The unanimous ruling in United States v. Nixon found that the president of the United States does not possess an absolute, unqualified executive privilege to withhold information. Writing for the court, Chief Justice Warren Burger stated:

We conclude that when the ground for asserting privilege as to subpoenaed materials sought for use in a criminal trial is based only on the generalized interest in confidentiality, it cannot prevail over the fundamental demands of due process of law in the fair administration of criminal justice. The generalized assertion of privilege must yield to the demonstrated, specific need for evidence in a pending criminal trial.

A short while after the decision was made public, Nixon issued a statement saying that, while "disappointed in the result, I respect and accept the court's decision, and I have instructed Mr. St. Clair to take whatever measures are necessary to comply with that decision in all respects." The president was at the Western White House in California at the time, where he remained through July 28.

=== Debating accumulated evidence ===
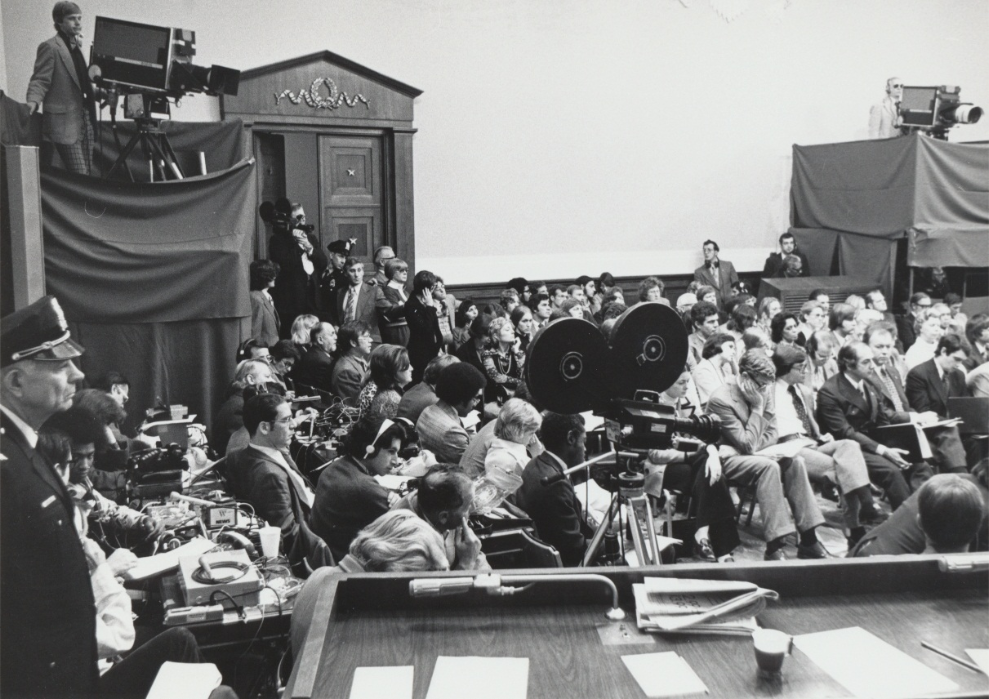
The Judiciary Committee's impeachment hearings received intense press attention. Portions were broadcast live on television.

Ready to consider a resolution to impeach President Nixon, the Judiciary Committee resumed public hearings on July 24; the process of debating, amending and rewriting the proposal (known as "markup") continued through July 30. As agreed to by the committee, two days of general debate were held (July 24–25), and then each article of impeachment in the proposed resolution was considered separately. The final four-day debate on the articles had an estimated television audience of 35–40 million people, according to Nielsen ratings, with the average U.S. household watching 1.9 days of the debates, for an average of 3 hours 49 minutes.

Chairman Rodino set the tone for the proceedings in his opening remarks, saying: "We have deliberated. We have been patient. We have been fair. Now the American people, the House of Representatives and the Constitution and the whole history of our republic demand that we make up our minds." Then, the second ranking Democrat on the committee, Harold Donohue, set the framework, introducing the proposed resolution of impeachment, which included two draft articles. The first accused Nixon of having obstructed justice by participating in the Watergate cover-up. The second listed a number of alleged abuses of presidential authority.

Next, one by one, committee members spoke. Democrat Jack Brooks, who had been enthusiastically working toward Nixon's impeachment and conviction, expressed his hope that Republicans could not, any more than Democrats, "tolerate the flouting of our laws by a president who is constitutionally charged with seeing to faithful execution of the laws." He also urged the committee not to waver in its pursuit of the president's impeachment. "This is not a pleasant duty, but it is our constitutional duty," he said. "Its performance may mean ignoring personal and political relationships of long standing. But we as well as the president are on trial for how faithfully we fulfill our constitutional responsibility."

Earlier in July, Brooks had drafted and distributed to all members of the committee a strongly-worded set of impeachment articles. Though strident and partisan, they provided the impetus for other Democrats to begin framing articles of their own. Further, the Brooks articles heavily influenced the set of articles presented to the committee on July 24. Because of the part he played in the president's downfall, Nixon later called Brooks his "executioner."

Walter Flowers, a Southern Democrat from Alabama, a state which supported Nixon in 1972, had been leaning against impeachment, but after a long struggle, he indicated on July 25 that he would vote for impeachment. The congressman said: "I felt that if we didn't impeach, we'd just ingrain and stamp in our highest office a standard of conduct that's just unacceptable." Charles Rangel had a somber yet positive take that day on the proceedings. Viewing them as confirmation of the Constitution's soundness, he declared: "Some say this is a sad day in America's history. I think it could perhaps be one of our brightest days. It could be really a test of the strength of our Constitution, because what I think it means to most Americans is that when this or any other president violates his sacred oath of office, the people are not left helpless."

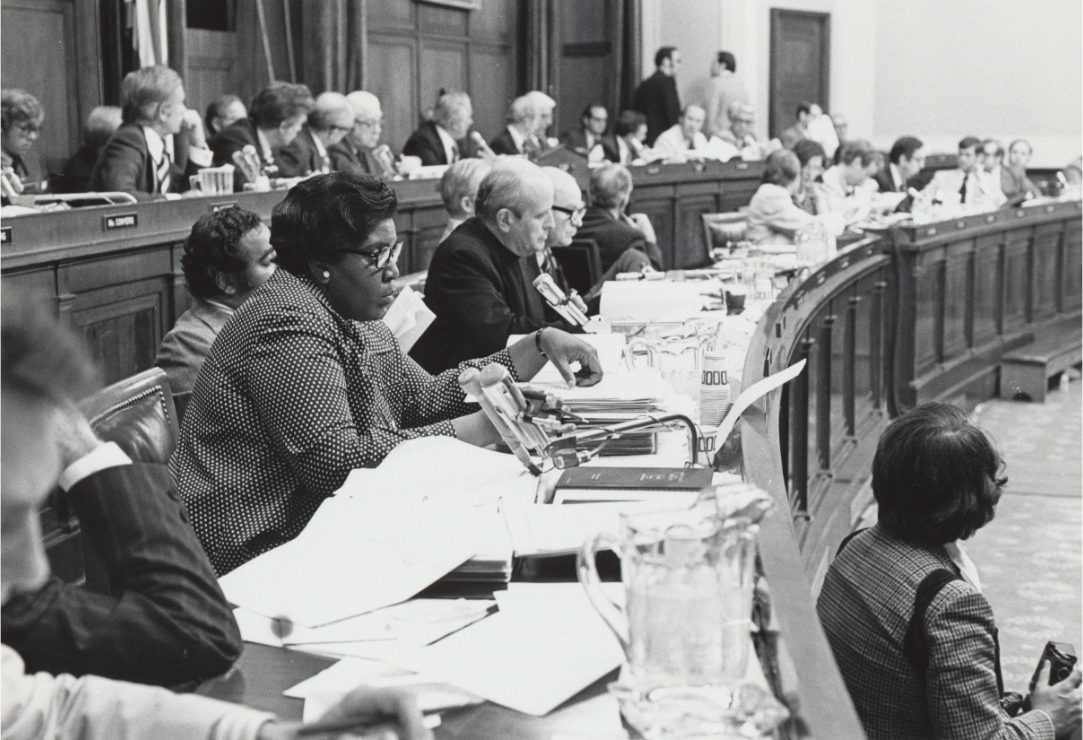
Representative Barbara Jordan (left) became nationally known for her eloquence during the Judiciary Committee's impeachment hearings.

On July 25, 1974, Democrat Barbara Jordan delivered a robust speech extolling the U.S. Constitution and its checks and balances. With a booming voice she declared: "I am not going to sit here and be an idle spectator to the diminution, the subversion, the destruction of the Constitution." Her denunciation of President Nixon's abuses of power stirred the nation and earned her national recognition and praise for her rhetoric, genuineness, and insight.

The first visible crack in the ranks of Republican committee members opened July 23 when Lawrence Hogan announced that he would vote for impeachment, charging that Nixon had "lied repeatedly" to Congress and to the American people. He had frequently defended the president before the committee during the hearings, "but after reading the transcripts," he said, describing how he decided to support impeachment, "it was sobering: the number of untruths, the deception, and the immoral attitudes. At that point, I began tilting against the president, and my conviction grew steadily." Reflecting nearly 20 years later, Nixon described Hogan's defection as "a very bad blow."

Two days later, Republican Hamilton Fish indicated his willingness to support certain articles of impeachment. "At the very least," Fish explained, the president "is bound not to violate the law, not to order others to violate the law, and not to participate in the concealment of evidence respecting violations of the law of which he is made aware." William Cohen also announced his decision to vote in favor of impeachment, saying: "I have been faced with the terrible responsibility of assessing the conduct of a president that I voted for, believed to be the best man to lead this country. But a president who in the process by act or acquiescence allowed the rule of law and the Constitution to slip under the boots of indifference and arrogance and abuse." Similarly, M. Caldwell Butler also announced his decision to vote in favor of impeachment, saying: "For years we Republicans have campaigned against corruption and misconduct. ... but Watergate is our shame."

As the public hearings resumed, a coalition composed of Moderate Republicans Fish, Butler, Cohen, and Tom Railsback, plus Southern Democrats Walter Flowers, James Mann and Ray Thornton, began crafting articles of impeachment on abuse of power and obstruction of justice. Their work ensured that the wording of the committee's final set of articles would have solid bipartisan support.

Other Republicans on the committee, however, looked at the evidence but concluded that it did not meet their standards for impeachment. Wiley Mayne, for one, contended that the case against Nixon was circumstantial, nothing but "a series of inferences piled upon other inferences." Even so, he was critical of the administration's moral tone when he spoke on July 25, saying he certainly deplored "the sorry example which was set by the chief executive ... in his personal as well as his official conduct."

Nixon's Republican defenders had, from the start of the impeachment hearings, construed the evidence as narrowly as possible, demanded ironclad proof and offered innocuous interpretations of information damaging to the president. Continuing that strategy during the televised debate, Charles W. Sandman Jr. asserted on July 24 that those advocating impeachment had failed to provide decisive evidence that the president had committed an impeachable offense. During his opening speech he said, "If somebody, for the first time in seven months, gives me something that is direct, I will vote to impeach." The next day, Charles E. Wiggins, perhaps President Nixon's strongest defender during the House proceedings, eloquently sought to reinforce the message that there was no specific evidence directly linking Nixon to any criminal act, declaring, "Simple theories, of course, are inadequate." He then added, "That is not evidence. A supposition, however persuasive, is not evidence. A bare possibility that something might have happened is not evidence."

By contrast, committee Democrats and pro-impeachment Republicans pointed to specific presidential acts and conversations they considered solid evidence. In doing so, they frequently turned to transcripts of taped presidential conversations to read back Nixon's own words. Among them was Democrat Elizabeth Holtzman, who recited quote after quote to frame her argument.

At the close of the marathon two-day general debate, Rodino said publicly for the first time that he would recommend the adoption of the articles of impeachment. By then it was clear that a sizable bipartisan majority of Judiciary Committee members were prepared to support the resolution formally proposing the impeachment of President Nixon—all 21 Democrats plus six Republicans according to The New York Times. As the committee pressed ahead the next day to consider its proposed articles of impeachment, Deputy White House Press Secretary Gerald Lee Warren noted that Nixon was "virtually resigned to the likelihood" that the committee would recommend impeachment with a bipartisan majority. But nonetheless, he added: "Our belief is that the House will not vote out a bill of impeachment."

=== Debating articles of impeachment ===
==== Obstruction of justice ====
At the outset of the committee's proceedings on July 26, Paul Sarbanes offered a substitute for Harold Donohue's first article of impeachment. Formulated through negotiations between liberal Democrats, led by Jack Brooks, and the Southern Democrat – Moderate Republican coalition group, it passed, following two days of impassioned debate, by a 27–11 margin; with six Republicans voting in favor along with all 21 Democrats. The article alleged that the president had worked with subordinates to "delay, impede, and obstruct the investigation" into the Watergate break-in; to cover up, conceal and protect those responsible; and to conceal the existence and scope of other unlawful covert activities."

As debate on the article commenced, Republican opponents of impeachment complained that the article was unfair because it did not contain "specificity" regarding the details of the obstruction of justice charge, the dates, names and events on which it was based. One after another, they challenged those who would impeach to come up with more details in purposeful conversations to be linked together as part of a concerted plan by Nixon to obstruct justice. Use of the term became a focal point: as the New York Times reported, "For two days the 38 members of the House Judiciary Committee have argued and quibbled and sometimes shouted about the meaning of the word 'specificity.'" The question in part revolved around how much of the Constitution's requirements for due process and legal notice applied to an impeachment proceeding, as well as around evolving standards regarding the level of detail in criminal indictments in general.

Charles Sandman was one of those most vocal in demanding the specifics for each alleged obstructing act. He led the Republican opposition against the nine subsections of the Sarbanes proposal one by one. His objective was to maneuver those favoring impeachment into divisive arguments over what particulars to include. The "specificity" argument by the Nixon defenders appeared effective, which initially led some proponents of the article to worry, but ultimately caused them to rally.

John Doar distributed a list of brief discussion points detailing the evidence against the president, which one Democrat after another used to enumerate Nixon's misdeeds when it was their turn at the microphones. Proponents of the article also persistently countered arguments about the lack of specific details of the alleged obstruction of justice by stating that the supporting facts should and would be included in the committee's final report rather than jammed into the article itself.

Ultimately the "specificity" tactic proved ineffective and was abandoned. In acknowledging the reality of the situation, Sandman lamented on July 28 that, "There is no way the outcome of this vote is going to be changed by debate." In the end, the solid bipartisan vote in favor of the first article, which transcended ideological alliances, put to rest the charge that the committee's proceedings were nothing more than a partisan vendetta against the president.

Article I vote, July 27, 1974
Adopted 27–11	■ Democrats: 21 yes, 0 no ■ Republicans: 6 yes, 11 no

==== Abuse of presidential power ====
On July 29, William Hungate offered a substitute for Donohue's second article of impeachment. Formulated through the same process as the first article substitute, it passed, following a spirited debate, by a 28–10 margin; with seven Republicans voting yes along with all 21 Democrats. The article stated that the president had "repeatedly engaged in conduct violating the constitutional rights of citizens" by "impairing the due and proper administration of justice and the conduct of lawful inquiries." Moreover, it asserted that the president had violated his constitutional oath of office and failed in his duty to take care that the nation's laws are faithfully executed by:

1. Attempting to use the Internal Revenue Service to initiate tax audits or obtain confidential tax data for political purposes;
2. Using a "national security" cover for a series of secret wiretaps against government officials, newsmen and the president's brother, Donald Nixon;
3. Establishing the White House special investigations unit, later dubbed the "plumbers," for "covert and unlawful activities" that included the 1971 burglary of the office of a psychiatrist in search of information to defame Daniel Ellsberg for his part in publication of the Pentagon Papers;
4. "Failing to act" on the knowledge that close subordinates had sought to impede justice in the Watergate case and related matters;
5. "Knowingly" misusing the power vested in his office to interfere with activities of the Federal Bureau of Investigation, the Central Intelligence Agency, the Department of Justice and the Watergate special prosecutor.

In support of the president's impeachment, George E. Danielson made a forceful argument for Article II, calling it "the most important article this committee may pass out." He went on to say that: "The offenses charged are uniquely presidential offenses. No one else can commit them. ... Only the president can violate the oath of the office of president. ... Only the president can harm the presidency." Also supporting Article II (after opposing Article I) was the committee's second ranking Republican, Robert McClory, whose view it was that the article "really gets at the crux" of the committee's responsibility for holding the president accountable for his actions while in office. Its inclusion in the impeachment resolution would, he said, "aid future Presidents to know this Congress and this House Judiciary Committee will hold them to an oath of office and an obligation to see that the laws are faithfully executed."

Though there was no doubt that the article would be approved, Nixon's stalwart Republican defenders continued to press the president's case. Edward Hutchinson accused the Democrats of building their case on cherry picked events from the Nixon presidency, asking rhetorically, "Is it really fair? Does it depict the whole truth to examine the entire record of this administration ... and to cull from that huge mass of official actions this relative handful of specific allegations and derive from them the proposition that the President's conduct has been repeatedly unlawful?" Charles Wiggins questioned whether abuses of power fell within the Constitutional definition of high crimes and misdemeanors. He warned that "Adoption of such an article would embed in our constitutional history for the first time ... the principle that a president may be impeached because of the view of Congress that he has abused his powers although he may have acted in violation of no law." He also attempt to narrow the scope and gut key allegations, but every amendment he proposed was easily defeated by the substantial bipartisan majority favoring the article.

Article II vote, July 29, 1974
Adopted 28–10	■ Democrats: 21 yes, 0 no ■ Republicans: 7 yes, 10 no

==== Contempt of Congress ====
On July 30, the final day of its impeachment debate, Article III, charging Nixon with contempt of Congress for his defiance of eight Judiciary Committee subpoenas, issued during April, May and June 1974, was introduced by Robert McClory, and was approved by a narrow 21–17 margin. The president's refusal to comply with federal court and congressional subpoenas had been included among the various charges of abuses of authority in the initial version of Article II, but was absent from the substitute. Proponents argued that Nixon's consistent "stonewalling" constituted an impeachable offence as it threatened to diminish the House's constitutional impeachment power. McClory argued that the claim of executive privilege "has no place in an impeachment inquiry." Opponents argued that the dispute over access to evidence should have been handled either through the courts or by seeking a House citation for contempt of Congress. Seven Republicans who had been part of the bipartisan coalition driving the first two articles returned to the party fold; one, Tom Railsback, warned that the Democratic majority appeared bent on "political overkill," by considering additional articles.

Article III vote, July 30, 1974
Adopted 21–17	■ Democrats: 19 yes, 2 no ■ Republicans: 2 yes, 15 no

==== Cambodia bombing / war powers ====
Next, John Conyers introduced an article charging that Nixon had intentionally concealed "the facts" from Congress and had submitted to Congress "false and misleading statements concerning the existence, scope and nature of American bombing operations in Cambodia" in disregard of Congress's constitutional power to declare war. Conyers, an outspoken Nixon critic (and number 13 on Nixon's Enemies List), argued that the president's desire to cover-up the facts of the bombing campaign was another example of the issue underlying "all of the acts [of presidential wrongdoing] that have been debated thus far." The article failed to gain widespread support, however, and was defeated 12–26. Nine Democrats, including Rodino, along with all 17 Republicans voted against it.

While no one challenged the veracity of the allegations contained in the article, it failed, Conyers later observed, because "condemning the Cambodian bombing would also have required us to indict previous administrations and to admit that the Congress has failed to fully meet its own constitutional obligations." Those opposed to including the article raised compelling arguments, pointing out that key congressional leaders of both political parties had been privy to the information and had neither said anything to the rest of Congress nor done anything about it, contending that the president's actions had been appropriate uses of his power as Commander-in-chief, and noting that this particular congressional-authority versus presidential-authority dispute had already been addressed by the War Powers Resolution (passed over Nixon's veto one year earlier). Another factor working against the proposal was the realization that putting the Cambodia article before the full House would interject the volatile issue of the role of the U.S. military in the Vietnam War into the impeachment debate.

Article IV vote, July 30, 1974
Rejected 12–26	■ Democrats: 12 yes, 9 no ■ Republicans: 0 yes, 17 no

==== Emoluments and tax fraud ====
Lastly, Edward Mezvinsky introduced an article charging that improvements made to Nixon's private homes at San Clemente, California, and Key Biscayne, Florida, at government expense constituted a violation of the Domestic Emoluments Clause, and also that his acknowledged underpayment of federal income taxes between 1969 and 1972 constituted willful tax evasion. Mezvinsky asserted that Nixon "took advantage of the Presidency to avoid paying proper taxes." Nixon's malfeasance since entering office was a "serious threat to our tax system," he said, because "we expect the law to be applied equally to every taxpayer." After a debate scheduled by the committee's leaders so as to reach the prime‐time television audience, the article was rejected, also by a 12–26 margin.

Those opposed to its inclusion as part of the impeachment resolution raised several objections. On the emoluments charge they pointed out that the property improvements made at the president's Florida and California residences had been made at the request of the U.S. Secret Service and contended that there was no direct evidence to show that the president knew that government money was being spent on the projects. On the taxes charge it was argued that there was insufficient evidence to prove an intent to defraud, and that the alleged crime was not an impeachable offense as it did not involve an abuse of presidential power.

Article V vote, July 30, 1974
Rejected 12–26	■ Democrats: 12 yes, 9 no ■ Republicans: 0 yes, 17 no

== Text of articles reported to the House ==
The Judiciary Committee agreed to three articles of impeachment against President Nixon. Together they were a sharp rebuke of his conduct in office, as each one concluded with the same declaration, that:

In all of this, Richard M. Nixon has acted in a manner contrary to his trust as President and subversive of constitutional government, to the great prejudice of the cause of law and justice and to the manifest injury of the people of the United States. Wherefore Richard M. Nixon, by such conduct, warrants impeachment and trial, and removal from office.

The committee finished its work on July 30, 1974, two years, one month and 13 days after the Watergate break-in. "By its diligence and the bipartisan magnitude of its vote," Time Magazine wrote a few days later, "the House Judiciary Committee has virtually assured a substantial, bipartisan vote for impeachment in the full House. That in turn is sure to have an impact on the Senate, as will public opinion."

=== Article I ===
Article I, charging Nixon with obstruction of justice, alleged in part that:

On June 17, 1972, and prior thereto, agents of the Committee for the Re-election of the President committed unlawful entry of the headquarters of the Democratic National Committee in Washington, District of Columbia, for the purpose of securing political intelligence. Subsequent thereto, Richard M. Nixon, using the powers of his high office, engaged personally and through his close subordinates and agents, in a course of conduct or plan designed to delay, impede, and obstruct the investigation of such illegal entry; to cover up, conceal and protect those responsible; and to conceal the existence and scope of other unlawful covert activities.

The article also specified nine ways by which the president was alleged to have carried out the plan to obstruct the investigation.

=== Article II ===
Article II, charging Nixon with abuse of power, alleged in part that:

Using the powers of the office of President of the United States, Richard M. Nixon, in violation of his constitutional oath faithfully to execute the office of President of the United States and, to the best of his ability, preserve, protect, and defend the Constitution of the United States, and in disregard of his constitutional duty to take care that the laws be faithfully executed, has repeatedly engaged in conduct violating the constitutional rights of citizens, impairing the due and proper administration of justice and the conduct of lawful inquiries, or contravening the laws governing agencies of the executive branch and the purposes of these agencies.

The article also cited five specific examples of alleged misconduct to substantiate this charge against the president.

=== Article III ===
Article III, charging Nixon with contempt of Congress alleged in part that:

In his conduct of the office of President of the United States, Richard M. Nixon, contrary to his oath faithfully to execute the office of President of the United States and, to the best of his ability, preserve, protect, and defend the Constitution of the United States, and in violation of his constitutional duty to take care that the laws be faithfully executed, has failed without lawful cause or excuse to produce papers and things as directed by duly authorized subpoenas issued by the Committee on the Judiciary of the House of Representatives on April 11, 1974, May 15, 1974, May 30, 1974, and June 24, 1974, and willfully disobeyed such subpoenas. The subpoenaed papers and things were deemed necessary by the Committee in order to resolve by direct evidence fundamental, factual questions relating to Presidential direction, knowledge or approval of actions demonstrated by other evidence to be substantial grounds for impeachment of the President. In refusing to produce these papers and things Richard M. Nixon, substituting his judgment as to what materials were necessary for the inquiry, interposed the powers of the Presidency against the lawful subpoenas of the House of Representatives, thereby assuming to himself functions and judgments necessary to the exercise of the sole power of impeachment vested by the Constitution in the House of Representatives.

== Nixon's support in Congress deteriorates ==
Despite "a triple whammy" of events in late July—the widely covered Judiciary Committee hearings, the Supreme Court's order to surrender the tapes, and six Republican defections—Nixon, according to White House Chief of Staff Alexander Haig, had not "changed one iota his sense of self‐confidence and sense of determination to see this thing through." He was closely studying the possible vote counts that impeachment in the House or trial in the Senate would get; Henry Kissinger later sympathetically described the president at this time as "a man awake in his own nightmare." Republican leaders in Congress were also estimating vote counts. During a July 29 meeting between House Minority Leader John Rhodes and Senate Minority Leader Hugh Scott, Rhodes estimated that impeachment in the House would get as many as 300 votes (well more than the 218 needed) and Scott surmised that there were 60 votes for conviction in the Senate (a little short of 67 necessary). Both felt that the situation was deteriorating for the president.

Public support for the president was also deteriorating. A Harris Poll completed August 3 found that two‐thirds (66%) of the American public "believe that President Nixon should be impeached over Watergate scandals and tried." The "pro‐impeachment" total had increased by 13 percentage points during the course of the Judiciary Committee's televised debate and votes on the articles of impeachment.

=== Arrangements for impeachment vote and trial ===
On August 2, the House Rules Committee announced that the Judiciary Committee's report on the three articles of impeachment would be completed by August 8, and that the House would begin debating them on August 19. The Washington Post reported on August 7 that the members of the Democratic and Republican leadership had agreed informally to cut in half the time for debating impeachment on the House floor. Thus the televised debate would have lasted for one week rather than two.

Soon after the Judiciary Committee approved the first article of impeachment, Senate Majority Leader Mike Mansfield and Senator Scott met to start planning for a likely impeachment trial. The 100 senators would have served as jurors, with Chief Justice Burger presiding; a group of House members would have served as prosecutors, with Nixon's lawyers defending. Following a delay to give the president time to prepare, the actual trial, according to Senator Jacob Javits, was unlikely to start before November and might run well into January 1975.

Francis R. Valeo, the secretary of the U.S. Senate, was put in charge of making the arrangements. It was decided that there would be television coverage of the trial, and technical preparations and discussions of specific ground rules for the press and the public were underway. Because Nixon might be forced to be in attendance during the Senate proceedings, Kissinger came up with plans to form a small group to manage the government in the president's place, to be composed of a few top Cabinet officers and congressional leaders as well as Chief of Staff Haig.

=== The "smoking gun" tape ===
Nixon Oval Office meeting with H.R. Haldeman (the "smoking gun" conversation), June 23, 1972

President Nixon complied with the Supreme Court order to deliver all subpoenaed tape recordings to Watergate investigators on July 30. White House secretaries prepared verbatim transcripts, and in accordance with Judge Sirica's order, copies went to St. Clair—who had not previously listened to any of the tapes, as Nixon had never granted him access. When transcripts were made public on August 5, a conversation on one, recorded June 23, 1972, only a few days after the break-in at the Democratic National Committee offices, proved that Nixon's assertion of having had no involvement in the cover-up was a lie. The tape, later known as the "smoking gun" tape, documented the initial stages of the Watergate cover-up. On it, Nixon and then-Chief of Staff H. R. Haldeman are heard formulating a plan to block investigations by having the CIA falsely claim to the FBI that national security was involved. This demonstrated both that Nixon had been told of the White House connection to the Watergate burglaries soon after they took place, and that he had approved plans to thwart the investigation. In a statement accompanying the release of the tape, Nixon accepted blame for misleading the country about when he had been told of White House involvement, saying he had a lapse of memory.

=== Political fallout ===
The following morning, August 6, Nixon attempted to rally his Cabinet's continued support. "In my opinion and in the opinion of my counsel, I have not committed any impeachable offense," he asserted. Therefore, he declared, "the constitutional process should be followed out to the end—wherever the end may be." In response, Vice President Ford, who had been crisscrossing the nation for months speaking in defense of the president, told Nixon that while he would continue to support Nixon's policies, he would no longer speak to the media or to the public on the subject of impeachment; Ford had issued a statement the previous evening saying he would "respectfully decline to discuss impeachment matters in public or in response to questions until the facts are more fully available."

Confronted with the incontrovertible fact that Nixon had played a leading role in the Watergate cover-up from its initial stages, the ranks of Nixon's defenders in Congress thinned rapidly. Various Senate Republicans expressed their "shock or outrage" and echoed the growing sentiment favoring the president's resignation. In a pointed statement, Robert P. Griffin, the assistant minority leader, urged the president to resign, saying: "I think we've arrived at a point where both the national interest and his own (Nixon's) interest would best be served by resigning." Nixon needed 34 votes to avoid conviction and removal. However, Bob Dole of Kansas speculated that "if the president had 40 votes (for acquittal in a Senate trial) a week ago, he had no more than 20 today." Additionally, John Tower of Texas said a tentative decision had been made "to send a delegation to the president to advise him of the strong sentiment among Republicans for retirement and to warn him that he will very likely be convicted in the Senate if he does not resign first." Barry Goldwater of Arizona agreed later that day to lead the delegation.

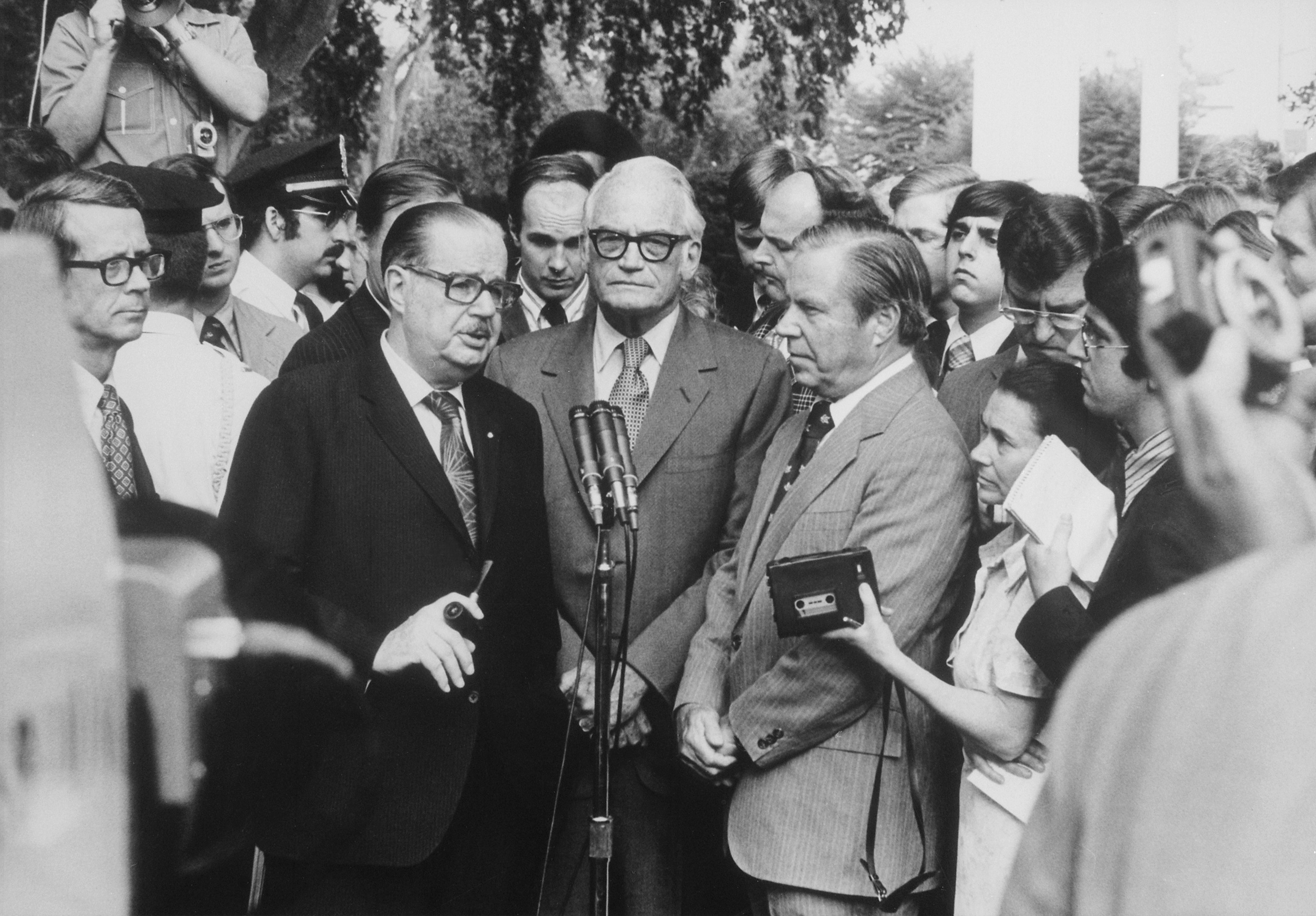
Senators Scott and Goldwater and Representative Rhodes hold an informal press conference following their August 7 meeting with the president

There was a continuous barrage of similar public declarations throughout the day by various House Republicans. Wiggins said that "the facts then known to me have now changed," and it was now clear to him that the president had a "plan of action" to cover up the break-in. For Wiggins, this was more than enough "to sustain at least one count against the president of conspiracy to obstruct justice." He urged Nixon to resign, saying that a protracted impeachment trial would not be in the nation's interest. While he announced he would vote to impeach Nixon for obstruction of justice, he would oppose the other two articles out of concern that they would set "unfortunate historical precedents." On August 2, Haig and St. Clair had invited Wiggins to review the transcripts prior to their release. Upon reading them, Wiggins concluded that they proved Nixon was involved in the cover-up. In Wiggins' view, this meant Nixon's cause in the House was "hopelessly lost," and probably lost in the Senate as well.

The decision of Nixon's staunchest defender on the Judiciary Committee to vote for impeachment was underlined in The New York Times headline of August 7, "Wiggins for Impeachment; Others in G.O.P. Join Him." The nine other Republicans on the Judiciary Committee who had voted against every article of impeachment gave indication that they would vote to impeach Nixon for obstruction of justice when the vote was taken in the full House. This included some of Nixon's previously staunch supporters. David W. Dennis of Indiana said that Nixon had "destroyed his credibility" with his defenders on the committee, while Del Latta of Ohio lamented that the tapes made it obvious that "we certainly weren't given the truth" by the White House. "Devastating—impeachable," Sandman told reporters, now having the "specificity" he had demanded during the hearings. Ranking member Hutchinson announced he would support impeachment "with a heavy heart." Minority Leader Rhodes said that while he admired Nixon's accomplishments, "cover-up of criminal activity and misuse of federal agencies can neither be condoned nor tolerated." For this reason, Rhodes said, "when the roll is called in the House of Representatives, I will vote 'aye' on impeachment."

Among the few Republicans on Capitol Hill who still defended the president following the "smoking gun" revelation was Senator Carl Curtis, who implored Congress not to panic. He warned that the United States would become like a "banana republic" if Nixon was ousted in favor of Vice President Ford, who in turn would then select someone to fill the vice presidential slot. He said "this would mean both Ford and the new Vice President would be men who hadn't been elected to their high office, but merely nominated by a president under procedures for filling the vice presidency when it is vacant." Congressman Earl Landgrebe did as well, declaring: "Don't confuse me with the facts. I've got a closed mind. I will not vote for impeachment. I'm going to stick with my president even if he and I have to be taken out of this building and shot."

During the late afternoon of August 7, Senators Goldwater and Scott and Congressman Rhodes met with Nixon in the Oval Office and told him his support in Congress had all but disappeared. Scott told reporters afterward that they did not pressure Nixon to resign, but simply told the president that "the situation is very gloomy on Capitol Hill." Rhodes told the president he would face certain impeachment when the articles came up for vote in the full House. By Majority Leader O'Neill's estimate, no more than 75 representatives were willing to vote against the obstruction-of-justice article. Goldwater and Scott told the president that not only were there enough votes in the Senate to convict him, but that no more than 15 or so senators were willing to vote for acquittal. Goldwater later wrote that as a result of the meeting, Nixon "knew beyond any doubt that one way or another his presidency was finished." That night, Nixon finalized his decision to leave office.

== Resignation and conclusion ==
Nixon announces that he will resign

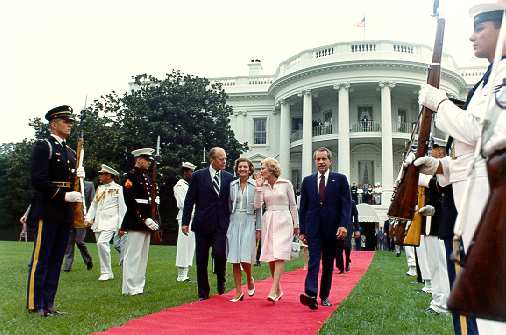
President Nixon and the first lady (in pink) leave the White House, accompanied by Vice President Ford and the second lady, August 9, 1974, shortly before Nixon's resignation became effective

Nixon met with Vice President Ford the following morning, August 8, to inform Ford of his intention to resign from office, and met with congressional leaders that evening to give them formal notice. Next, he met briefly with a group of longtime congressional friends, and then he informed the nation. Several days earlier, in advance of the release of the tapes on August 5, presidential speechwriter Ray Price had prepared two draft speeches for the president—one, a refusal-to-resign speech, and the second, a resignation speech. The latter served as the first draft of the speech Nixon delivered live on radio and television from the Oval Office that night.

In his address, Nixon said he was resigning because "I have concluded that because of the Watergate matter I might not have the support of the Congress that I would consider necessary to back the very difficult decisions and carry out the duties of this office in the way the interests of the nation would require." He also stated his hope that, by resigning, "I will have hastened the start of that process of healing which is so desperately needed in America." He then went on to review the accomplishments of his presidency, especially in foreign policy. Nixon acknowledged that some of his judgments "were wrong," and he expressed contrition, saying: "I deeply regret any injuries that may have been done in the course of the events that led to this decision." The speech contained no admission of wrongdoing, however, nor did it mention the articles of impeachment pending against him. Protesters outside the White House along Pennsylvania Avenue shouted " jail to the chief " throughout the night.

On the morning of August 9, 1974, after an emotional farewell to his Cabinet members and staff, Nixon and his family left the White House for San Clemente, California. He left behind a signed letter of resignation addressed to Secretary of State Kissinger (as required by the Presidential Succession Act of 1792), thereby becoming the first U.S. president to resign from office. His presidency officially ended at 11:35 am, when Kissinger received the letter, and Ford's began. A short while later, in the East Room of the White House, Ford was sworn into office by Chief Justice Burger, declaring "our long national nightmare is over."

Following Nixon's resignation, the impeachment process against him was formally concluded. On August 20, the House voted to accept the final Judiciary Committee report by a vote of 412 to 3, with Republican Earl Landgrebe, plus Democrats Otto Passman and Sonny Montgomery casting the only no votes. The 528‐page report, published on August 22, laid out in detail what it called the "clear and convincing evidence" against Nixon. It also contained a statement from the committee's Republican members who had originally opposed impeachment, stating for the record that Nixon had not been "hounded from office" but rather had destroyed his own presidency through his patterns of deceit.

== Aftermath ==
Though Nixon had not faced impeachment by the full House or a conviction by a Senate trial, criminal prosecution was still a possibility at both the federal and state levels. Concerned about Nixon's well-being, and worried that the "ugly passions" aroused by the Watergate scandal would rise again during a lengthy Nixon prosecution, on September 8, 1974, President Ford granted Nixon a pardon for all crimes he had "committed or may have committed or taken part in" as president. Nixon was initially reluctant to accept the pardon because he did not want to admit guilt, but then agreed to do so. In his official acceptance of the pardon, Nixon said that he "was wrong in not acting more decisively and more forthrightly in dealing with Watergate, particularly when it reached the stage of judicial proceedings and grew from a political scandal into a national tragedy."

Public opinion at the time of the pardon was negative according to a September 6–9, 1974 Gallup Poll, which found that "only 38 percent of Americans said Ford should pardon Nixon, while 53 percent said he should not." Numerous congressional Democrats issued statements critical of the pardon, and in light of it, some even sought to reopen the impeachment process against the former president. Specifically, Judiciary Committee members Jerome Waldie, George Danielson, and Don Edwards spoke of pressing the committee to pursue the outstanding subpoenas in order to bring all the evidence out into the open and to complete the formal record of Nixon's wrongdoing while in office. Chairman Rodino, however, declared that "impeachment is dead," forestalling such a move.

The following month, Ford appeared voluntarily before the Judiciary Committee's Subcommittee on Criminal Justice to explain the reasons behind the pardon. Two years later, lingering public resentment over the Nixon pardon was a factor in Ford's narrow loss to Democratic Party nominee Jimmy Carter in the 1976 presidential election.

Nationwide, the 1974 midterm election was a landslide victory for the Democratic Party. In the House, Democrats won 49 seats previously held by Republicans and increased their majority above the two-thirds mark. Altogether, there were 93 freshmen representatives in the 94th Congress when it convened on January 3, 1975, 76 of them Democrats. Those elected to office that year later came to be known collectively as "Watergate Babies." Several Republican Judiciary Committee members were defeated in the 1974 elections by their Democratic opponents. Chief among them was Charles Sandman, who was soundly defeated by William J. Hughes. Also defeated were David W. Dennis, losing to Philip Sharp, Wiley Mayne, losing to Berkley Bedell, Harold Vernon Froehlich, losing to Robert John Cornell, and Joseph J. Maraziti, losing to Helen Stevenson Meyner.

Regarding the Judiciary Committee's process and its momentous recommendation that President Nixon be impeached and removed from office, Rodino, in a 1989 interview with Susan Stamberg of National Public Radio, said:

Notwithstanding the fact that I was a Democrat, notwithstanding the fact that there were many who thought that Rodino wanted to bring down a president as a Democrat, you know, he was our president. And this is our system that was being tested. And here was a man who had achieved the highest office that anyone could gift him with, you know. And you're bringing down the presidency of the United States, and it was a sad, sad commentary on our whole history and, of course, on Richard Nixon.

== See also ==
- List of efforts to impeach presidents of the United States
- List of federal political scandals in the United States

== Works cited ==
=== Books and journals ===
- Albert, Carl (1990). Little Giant: The Life and Times of Speaker Carl Albert. With Danney Goble. Norman, Oklahoma: University of Oklahoma Press. ISBN 0-8061-2250-1.
- Ambrose, Stephen E. (1991). Nixon: Ruin and Recovery 1973–1990. Vol. III. New York, New York: Simon & Schuster. ISBN 978-0-671-69188-2.
- Apple, R. W. Jr. (1973). Staff of The New York Times (ed.). The Watergate Hearings: Break-in and Cover-up. Bantam Books. ISBN 978-0-553-08383-5.
- Baym, Geoffrey (Winter 2003). "Strategies of Illumination: U.S. Network News, Watergate, and the Clinton Affair". Rhetoric and Public Affairs. 6 (4). Michigan State University Press: 633–656. doi:10.1353/rap.2004.0001. JSTOR 41939869. S2CID 143653995.
- Bernstein, Carl (2007). A Woman in Charge: The Life of Hillary Rodham Clinton. New York, New York: Alfred A. Knopf. ISBN 978-0-375-40766-6.
- Bernstein, Carl; Woodward, Bob (2014) [1974]. All the President's Men (Trade paperback ed.). New York, New York: Simon & Schuster. ISBN 978-1-4767-7051-2.
- Black, Conrad (2007). Richard M. Nixon: A Life in Full. New York, New York: PublicAffairs Books. ISBN 978-1-58648-519-1.
- Conyers, John (October 1974). "Why Nixon Should Have Been Impeached". The Black Scholar. 6 (2). Taylor & Francis: 2–8. JSTOR 41065758.
- Engel, Jeffrey A.; Meacham, Jon; Naftali, Timothy; Baker, Peter (2018). Impeachment: An American History. New York, New York: Modern Library. ISBN 978-1-984-85378-3.
- Ford, Gerald R. (1979). A Time to Heal: The Autobiography of Gerald R. Ford. New York, New York: Harper & Row. ISBN 978-0-0601-1297-4.
- Germond, Jack (1999). Fat Man in a Middle Seat: Forty Years of Covering Politics. New York, New York: Random House. ISBN 978-0-3755-0098-5.
- Gormley, Ken (1997). Archibald Cox: The Conscience of a Nation. Reading, Massachusetts: Addison-Wesley. ISBN 0-2014-0713-2.
- Greenberg, David (2003). Nixon's Shadow: The History of an Image. New York, New York: W. W. Norton & Company. ISBN 978-0-3930-4896-4.
- Kissinger, Henry (1982). Years of Upheaval. Boston, Massachusetts: Little, Brown & Co. ISBN 978-0316285919.
- Kutler, Stanley I. (1990). The Wars of Watergate: The Last Crisis of Richard Nixon. New York, New York: Alfred A. Knopf. ISBN 978-0-3945-6234-6.
- Labovitz, John R. (1978). Presidential Impeachment. New Haven, Connecticut: Yale University Press. ISBN 0-300-02213-1.
- Nevin, Mark (July 2017). "Nixon Loyalists, Barry Goldwater, and Republican Support for President Nixon during Watergate". The Journal of Policy History. 29 (3). Cambridge University Press: 403–430. doi:10.1017/S0898030617000173.
- Reeves, Richard (2001). President Nixon: Alone in the White House. New York, New York: Simon & Schuster. ISBN 0-7432-2565-1.
- Small, Melvin (1999). The Presidency of Richard Nixon. Lawrence, Kansas: University Press of Kansas. ISBN 978-0-7006-0973-4.
- Woodward, Bob; Bernstein, Carl (2005) [1976]. The Final Days (Paperback ed.). New York, New York: Simon & Schuster. ISBN 978-0-7432-7406-7.
- Woods, Joseph A. Jr. (April 2000). "How High the Crime?". Hastings Law Journal. 51 (4). University of California, Hastings College of the Law: 753–758.
- Wright, Gerald C. Jr. (September 1977). "Constituency Response to Congressional Behavior: The Impact of the House Judiciary Committee Impeachment Votes". The Western Political Quarterly. 30 (3). University of Utah: 401–410. doi:10.2307/447940. JSTOR 447940.

=== U.S. federal government reports ===
This article incorporates public domain material from websites or documents of the U.S. federal government.

- Cole, Jared P.; Garvey, Todd (2015). Impeachment and Removal (PDF) (Report). Washington, D.C.: Congressional Research Service. R44260 – via University of North Texas Libraries, Digital Library, UNT Libraries Government Documents Department.
- Hudiburg, Jane A.; Davis, Christopher M. (2018). Resolutions to Censure the President: Procedure and History (PDF) (Report). Washington, D.C.: Congressional Research Service. R45087 – via University of North Texas Libraries, Digital Library, UNT Libraries Government Documents Department.
- Rybicki, Elizabeth; Greene, Michael (2019). The Impeachment Process in the House of Representatives (Report). Washington, D.C.: Congressional Research Service. R45769.
- Stathis, Stephen W.; Huckabee, David C. (1998). Congressional Resolutions on Presidential Impeachment: A Historical Overview (PDF) (Report). Washington, D.C.: Congressional Research Service. 98-763 – via University of North Texas Libraries, Digital Library, UNT Libraries Government Documents Department.
- United States House of Representatives (2007). "Section II—Jurisdictions History of the Judiciary Committee: Impeachment" (PDF). A History of the Committee on the Judiciary 1813–2006. Washington, D.C.: U.S. Government Publishing Office. pp. 115–136. H. Doc. 109-153.
