= Theron Lynd =

American circuit clerk (1920–1978)

Theron C. Lynd
- Lynd, left, attends to voter registration applicants
- Born: May 30, 1920; Moss Point, Mississippi, U.S.
- Died: January 31, 1978 (aged 57); Mississippi, U.S.
- Education: Mississippi State University
- Occupations: Circuit court clerk, voter registrar
- Known for: His role in discrimination and denying African American voter registration in the 1960s and 1970s
- Spouse: Miriam Howell

Theron Carl Lynd (May 30, 1920– January 31, 1978) was an American circuit clerk and voter registrar in Forrest County, Mississippi, who refused to register Black people during the civil rights movement. Lynd was the first southern voter registrar to be held in violation of charges of discrimination under the Federal Civil Rights Acts. Even after being ordered to cease denying African Americans voting rights in federal court, he continued to obstruct their registration by various means. Despite Lynd's segregationist stance and his six years of legal troubles, he continued to be re-elected until his death in 1978.

== Early life and education ==
Theron Carl Lynd was born on May 30, 1920, in Moss Point, Mississippi. His family moved to Hattiesburg when he was three years old, where he attended public schools.

Lynd attended Mississippi State University to study business and graduated in 1943. In college he was a member of the Lambda Chi Alpha fraternity.

== Career ==
He joined his father's oil and gas business, before working at the Hattiesburg Typewriter Company in 1958. Lynd was elected Forrest County Circuit Clerk in 1959, replacing Luther Cox, who had died in office. Lynd reported to and was surveilled by the Hattiesburg Citizens' Council and the Mississippi State Sovereignty Commission, a state agency established to fight desegregation efforts, these two organizations wanted to insure segregation was still happening in the court system.

== United States of America, v. Theron C. Lynd, and the State of Mississippi ==
The United States Government requested Lynd to open his voter registration records to federal inspectors for photography and examination on August 11, 1960, in compliance with Title III of the Civil Rights Act of 1960, but he refused. In July 1961, the United States Department of Justice filed a lawsuit against Lynd in violation of federal law title 42 United States Code Annotated section 1971(a), claiming Lynd and his office had routinely violated the civil rights of Black people in Forrest County by denying them the right to vote.

In March 1962, a Federal District Court injunction hearing was held in under Judge Harold Cox. Malcomb Mettie Roberts (also known as M. M. Roberts) was Lynd's lawyer; and Department of Justice lawyer and chief counsel John Doar handled the case for the federal government. The court case concluded that discrimination existed but it did not acknowledge the plaintiff's request for a preliminary injunction, so the Justice Department appealed Judge Cox's decision to the United States Court of Appeals for the Fifth Circuit in the Southern District (S.D.) in Houston.

The court ruled on April 10, 1962, during the 5th Circuit Court of Appeals meeting in New Orleans under Judges Elbert Tuttle, John Minor Wisdom and J.C. Hutcheson, "the trial court's decision to neither grant nor deny a request for a preliminary injunction in effect equated with denying the request altogether" and issued injunction requiring Lynd to stop discrimination. Lynd's attorneys then appealed to the Supreme Court of the United States asking to reverse the 5th Circuit's decision. On November 5, 1962, the U.S. Supreme Court denied certiorari.

On May 2, 1962, Lynd was served with papers and the federal government again filed suit against Lynd for allegedly ignoring the 5th circuit injunction order. From September 17–21, 1962 the case was heard in the United States Court of Appeals for the Fifth Circuit under Judges Griffin Bell, John Minor Wisdom, and John Robert Brown, and the federal government entered into evidence collected by the F.B.I. and had 51 witnesses testify. Rev. W. Ridgway testified before a congressional subcommittee that out of 12,958 African Americans in the county, only 25 people were permitted to vote. Such testimony and voter registration efforts drew the ire of Citizens' Councils groups and surveillance from the Mississippi State Sovereignty Commission. The 5th circuit court decided on July 15, 1963, that Lynd failed to comply with the first injunction, and he was found guilty on civil contempt charge. Lynd's litigation continued until 1967.

== Personal life and death ==
He married Miriam Howell in 1958. They had no children.

Lynd was over 6 feet tall and over 300 pounds. He was obese and a diabetic, and later in life had an amputation of both legs, around 1977. He died of apparent heart failure on January 30, 1978 at the age of 57, while serving his 5th term in office as the Circuit Clerk and Registrar of Voters for Forrest County, Mississippi. He is buried in a mausoleum in Roseland Park Cemetery in Hattiesburg. His wife was appointed to his office until a special election could be held.

== Legacy ==
As a result of the voting discrimination in 1962, Hattiesburg civil rights activist Vernon Dahmer started an African American voter registration drive and invited the Student Nonviolent Coordinating Committee (SNCC). The following winter hundreds of people protested Lynd’s refusal to register Black voters at the local courthouse on “Freedom Day”.

In the 1960s, Lynd had earned national recognition in depictions in comics and caricatures as a symbol of Southern racism. On September 26, 1962, the CBS Reports television series aired nationally on CBS, the episode "Mississippi and the 15th Amendment" featured Lynd, calling him "one of the most powerful men in America."

Lynd is included in archives at Mississippi Department of Archives and History, University of Southern Mississippi, and Digital Library of Georgia. Gordon A. Martin, a former Civil Rights Division attorney, judge and professor, wrote chapters on Lynd and the events in his book, Count Them One By One; Black Mississippians Fighting for the Right to Vote (2010). Lynd is also profiled in the William Sturkey book Hattiesburg: An American City in Black and White (Harvard University Press, 2019).

== See also ==
- Disfranchisement after the Reconstruction era
- Freedom Summer
- Samuel Bowers
- Clyde Kennard
