= Joseph A. Woods Jr. =

American lawyer

Joseph A. Woods Jr. (1925 – July 15, 2013) was an American lawyer in the state of California. In 1974 he served as a Senior Associate Special Counsel to the United States House of Representatives Judiciary Committee's impeachment inquiry staff during the impeachment process against Richard Nixon.

== Background ==
A native of Decatur, Alabama, Woods graduated from Boalt Hall in 1949 where he was editor of the California Law Review. His studies were interrupted by his service in World War II. Woods, as a first Lieutenant based in the Pacific from 1944 to 1946, was involved in the invasions of Luzon and Okinawa.

== Career ==
He began practicing law in 1949, joining an Oakland law firm that would later become Donahue Gallagher Woods, where he remained until 1990. From 1956 until 1988, he was also the attorney for Lucky Stores, and was on the board of directors.

In 1974 Woods worked in Washington, D.C., where he served as a Senior Associate Special Counsel to the U.S. House Judiciary Committee's impeachment inquiry staff during the impeachment process against Richard Nixon. His job was to supervise the staff's constitutional and legal research. He led a team of staff lawyers (that included future First Lady Hillary Clinton) examining constitutional and legal questions related to impeachment and the definition of "high crimes and misdemeanors" – one of the grounds stated in Article II, Section 4 of the Constitution for impeachment of a federal official. Through their in-depth study of how the constitutional language about impeachment came to be adopted during the 1787 Constitutional Convention and of the long history of British impeachment cases, the staff produced a guide for the Judiciary Committee, a 64-page report, entitled "Constitutional Grounds for Presidential Impeachment," which asserted that not all crimes were impeachable offenses and that not all impeachable offenses were crimes, and that became a focal point of the Judiciary Committee's impeachment inquiry against President Nixon. Since 1974, it has been used as a guidebook during two House presidential impeachment inquiries: against Bill Clinton in 1998 and against Donald Trump in 2019.

Woods was a member of the National Council of the Institute of Governmental Studies at UC Berkeley and was president of the Alameda County Bar Association, representing Alameda County in the ABA House of Delegates from 1982 to 1990. A fellow of the American Bar Association from 1983, Woods served on the board of directors until his death and in later life wrote for the ABA's monthly newsletter. He died in Piedmont, California on July 15, 2013, aged 88.
