= Joseph Wood (congressman) =

American politician

- Born: 1712; Pennsylvania, United States
- Died: September 1791 (aged 78–79); Sunbury, Georgia
- Military career
- Other work: Member of the Continental Congress

Joseph Wood (1712–1791) was an American planter and soldier from Liberty County, Georgia. He served as a delegate from Georgia to the Continental Congress in 1777 and 1778.

== Early life ==
Joseph Wood was born in Pennsylvania, but moved to Georgia around 1774.

== Military career ==
Coat of Arms of Joseph Wood

As the American Revolution neared, he was frustrated by the Georgia Assembly's delay in deciding to support the united colonies. They didn't send a delegate to the Continental Congress in 1774. In February 1775 he made an appeal to their General Committee to join the war effort of the northern colonies. They still deferred action, although later that year they would send Lyman Hall to the Congress.

Wood didn't wait, but returned to Pennsylvania to join the 2nd Pennsylvania Regiment in the Continental Army. Captain Wood went with the regiment in the Invasion of Canada. The following year he saw action in New Jersey and was promoted first to major and then to colonel on September 6, 1776.

== Continental Congress, later life ==
When the Continental Line was reorganized at the end of 1776 there were too many officers, so Colonel Wood retired and returned to Georgia. On his return in January 1777, Georgia named him as one of their delegates to the Continental Congress and he was elected again in 1778.

Wood died on his plantation, near Riceborough in Liberty County in 1791. He was survived by his wife Catholina, and their children John, Jacob, Hester, and Elizabeth.
