= Joseph Andrew Woods =

Northern Irish politician

Joseph Andrew Woods (1870–1925) was a unionist politician in Northern Ireland.

Woods worked as a shipyard carpenter, and then as an insurance secretary. Despite having no political experience, he was elected as an Ulster Unionist Party member of the first Senate of Northern Ireland in 1921, serving until his death just over four years later.
