= Joe Wood (footballer) =

Australian rules footballer (1904–1972)

Personal information
- Full name: Joe Wood
- Born: 25 April 1904
- Died: 16 July 1972 (aged 68)
- Original team: North Melbourne Juniors
- Height: 170 cm (5 ft 7 in)
- Weight: 67 kg (148 lb)

Playing career^{1}
Years	Club	Games (Goals)
1925–1926	North Melbourne	13 (29)
- ^{1} Playing statistics correct to the end of 1926.

Joe Wood (25 April 1904 – 16 July 1972) was an Australian rules footballer who played with North Melbourne in the Victorian Football League (VFL). His name has also been given as Joe or Jack Woods.

Woods was North Melbourne's leading goal-kicker in the 1925 VFL season, their first year in the league. He kicked 27 goals, six of them in a win over South Melbourne.
