= Burton Benjamin =

American screenwriter

- Born: Burton Richard Benjamin; October 9, 1917; Cleveland, Ohio
- Died: September 18, 1988 (aged 70); Scarborough, New York
- Education: University of Michigan
- Occupations: Television director and producer
- Years active: 1939–1985
- Notable credit: CBS Evening News

Burton Richard Benjamin (October 9, 1917 – September 18, 1988) was a vice president and director of CBS News. He worked at CBS for 29 years, as a writer, producer, and executive. In that time, he was director of CBS News from 1978 to 1981 and executive producer of CBS Evening News from 1975 to 1978. He was a senior executive producer from 1968 to 1975 and from 1981 to 1985. At CBS, Benjamin often produced programs with Walter Cronkite.

He wrote Fair Play: CBS, General Westmoreland, and How a Television Documentary Went Wrong about the Benjamin Report, his report on The Uncounted Enemy and its related lawsuit.

== Early life and career ==
Burton Benjamin was born in Cleveland, Ohio to Sam and Ruth Bernstein Benjamin. In 1939, Burton earned a Bachelor of Arts at the University of Michigan. While in school in Cleveland and in college, Benjamin worked as a journalist.

In 1939, Benjamin worked for United Press and the Newspaper Enterprise Association in Cleveland and New York City until 1946. During this time, Benjamin served in World War II in the U.S. Coast Guard, earning the rank of lieutenant. Subsequently, Benjamin began writing and producing documentaries for RKO-Pathe, from 1946 to 1955. Burton Benjamin became a writer for television in 1955. He joined CBS in 1957 and became executive producer of The Twentieth Century that year, followed by The 21st Century in 1967. He also served as executive producer for CBS programs World War II, The Rockefellers, and CBS Reports.

He was executive producer of CBS Evening News from 1975 to 1978. He subsequently served as vice president, director of news, and supervisor of development of CBS Sunday Morning from 1978 to 1981. Before his retirement from CBS in 1985, the company charged him with producing what became known as the Benjamin Report, a document investigating one of CBS's documentaries. The documentary, The Uncounted Enemy, had prompted a $120 million lawsuit from William Westmoreland against CBS. CBS chose Benjamin for the report due to his credibility; Benjamin's report found the program guilty of serious journalistic lapses.

At times during his career, Benjamin also taught at his alma mater, the University of Michigan, as well as at Manhattanville College in Purchase, New York. Benjamin also served on the board of trustees of the Scarborough School, a private school near his home.

Benjamin's work earned him eight Emmy Awards, a Peabody Award, two Ohio State University Awards, and the American Bar Association Silver Gavel Award.

== Later life, death, and legacy ==
After retiring, Benjamin wrote Fair Play: CBS, General Westmoreland, and How a Television Documentary Went Wrong about the Benjamin Report, his report on The Uncounted Enemy and its related lawsuit. He was later offered to become president of CBS, however he declined. He also became a senior fellow of Columbia University's Gannett Center for Media Studies in 1986.

On September 19, 1988, Benjamin died of a brain tumor at his home in Scarborough, New York.

The Committee to Protect Journalists had been annually awarded the Burton Benjamin Memorial Award to journalists with significant achievements toward press freedom from 1991 to 2016 . The award was renamed in 2017 as the Gwen Ifill Press Freedom Award to honor the veteran journalist and former CPJ board member Gwen Ifill, who died in 2016.

== Personal life ==
In 1942, Benjamin married book critic Aline L. Wolff. In 1955, Benjamin, Aline, and their two daughters moved to Scarborough, a hamlet of Briarcliff Manor, New York. There the family befriended the families of John Cheever, Ely Jacques Kahn Jr., and architect Don Reiman.
