= Samuel A. Adams =

CIA analyst

- Born: June 14, 1934; Bridgeport, Connecticut, US
- Died: October 10, 1988 (aged 54); Strafford, Vermont, US
- Education: Harvard College
- Occupation: Intelligence Analyst

Samuel Alexander Adams (June 14, 1934 – October 10, 1988), known as Sam Adams, was an analyst for the Central Intelligence Agency (CIA). He is best known for his role in discovering that during the mid-1960s American military intelligence had underestimated the number of Viet Cong and North Vietnamese Army soldiers. Although his opinion was challenged, he pushed the case for a higher troop count. The issue under debate was called the Order of Battle (O/B). His efforts in 1967 met strong and persistent opposition from the Army (here MACV) which, in the short-term, prevailed against him.

Following his testimony for the defense during the 1973 prosecution of Pentagon Papers whistleblower Daniel Ellsberg, Adams resigned from the CIA. In 1975 his critical article on Vietnam War intelligence was published in Harper's. He then testified about the Viet Cong O/B before a Congressional committee that was investigating the CIA. In 1982 Adams was a consultant for a CBS News television documentary called The Uncounted Enemy. He was subsequently named as a co-defendant in the Westmoreland v. CBS civil trial for libel, which was successfully defended. When he died, he was writing a book about the O/B dispute, which was published posthumously several years later.

== Family and education ==
Although he was born in Bridgeport, Connecticut, Adams was born into the prominent Adams family of Massachusetts. His father, Pierpont 'Pete' Adams, was a stockbroker and member of the New York Stock Exchange. Sam Adams attended St. Mark's School in Southborough, Massachusetts. He graduated in European history from Harvard College, class of 1955. After two years in the Navy, he attended Harvard Law School, then worked for a while in banking.

== Career in the CIA ==
From 1963 to 1973 Sam Adams served in the CIA, mostly at its headquarters in Langley, Virginia. About the intelligence agency, he said, "I found to my astonishment that I really loved the place."

=== Africa division ===
Starting as an intelligence analyst at the Congo desk, in the CIA's new Africa Division, he read everything and talked to everybody, and "quickly became one of Washington's reigning authorities on the Congo". He wrote on its economy, but it was political turbulence in the newly independent state that drew world attention, including Cuban under Che. Adams later commented that "the Congo's problem" was "being both rich and weak at the same time."

Especially, it was for his coverage of the Simba rebellion that Adams won commendations. Although at first greeted with 'snickers' from intelligence agents at State, he successfully predicted the crisis appointment of Moise Tshombe by Joseph Kasavubu, then President of Congo. He briefed a high-level CIA conclave about the Simba and their invasion of the Congo from the east. The Simba reached Kisangani (then called Stanleyville), which prompted an intervention to rescue hostages. Tshombe was cheered "wherever he went". Adams won the esteem of analysts at CIA. As he later recalled, "It was terrific ... one of the high points of my life."

=== Far East division ===
In 1965 Adams transferred to the Vietnam desk, Southeast Asia Branch of the Far East Division. He read as background then-recent books by Võ Nguyên Giáp on the north's view of its earlier victory, People's War, People's Army, Bernard Fall on the French defeat, Street without Joy, and Joseph Buttinger's history of Vietnam, Smaller Dragon. His branch chief, Edward Hauck, when asked told Adams that the Vietnamese communists would probably outlast the Americans and, after 10 or 20 years, win the war.

==== Viet Cong motivation ====
In the role of a "generalist" and "roving analyst", Adams was assigned to study the Viet Cong. Its motivation and morale were his first objectives. Following his procedure per the Congo, he began assembling biographies of Viet Cong operatives, but stopped when told the names were all fake. He also netted little by reading captured documents in translation. He drew welcome information, however, out of statistics compiled in Saigon from the files of Chieu Hoi (South Vietnam's defector program).

Adams found VC defections per year were 10,000, and thus a 5% defection rate which was high, and rising. The statistics also showed an increase in VC killed, paralleling the higher defections. This information would counter the general CIA pessimism about the war. Yet feedback within his CIA office was ambiguous, noncommittal, cautious; they knew well enough the widespread evidence of the Viet Cong's growing success in the field, of its confidence and morale. His report "Viet Cong Morale: Possible Indicator of Downward Drift" was published, but with caveats in footnotes and distributed only within the CIA.

While in Vietnam, Adams got advice from a senior analyst. Accordingly, he inquired about VC desertions. A Rand Corporation office in Saigon was doing similar VC investigations; it was headed by Leon Gouré. He told Adams that VC deserters were seven times the number of VC defectors. This surprised and puzzled Adams, considering the math. Such a combined loss rate per year (10,000 defectors + 70,000 deserters), in addition to VC annual casualties (reported at 150,000), would severely reduce the Viet Cong's overall strength (which MACV's O/B put at 280,000). Yet the VC did not seem to be losing the war.

While doing this perplexing research, Adams discovered that in the provinces the ARVN's count of the VC guerrillas and militia was often much higher than MACV's, e.g., in Long An province it was 2000 instead of 160. He got permission to "look into enemy manpower".

MACV's Combined Document Exploitation Center (CDEC) in Saigon had been publishing annotated versions of captured documents in its bulletins. "Bulletin 689" contained a single three-page document, "Recapitulated Report on the People's Warfare Movement from Bình Định Province". It listed VC troop counts for several types of guerrillas and militias, which all together totaled 50,244. In MACV's country-wide O/B for VC, of the 280,000 grand total, only 100,000 were guerrillas or militia. Adams asked, "Why should Bình Định—one of forty-four provinces–have half of them?"

==== Order of Battle ====
Adams’ assignment in motivation led to his work in estimating the number of VC guerrillas. From his research into captured enemy documents and other sources, he "concluded that previous estimates had undercounted the communists by hundreds of thousands. The implications were astounding." If the Viet Cong enemy combatant count was higher, it implied that the prospects for a South Vietnamese military victory were dimmed. It questioned American claims of progress on the battlefield. It would be "politically disastrous" for the U.S. government. This numbers dispute became known in military terms as the Order of Battle (O/B) controversy.

His findings, at first ignored, then challenged, after a heated struggle were not adopted. MACV forcefully insisted on its lower numbers, and the CIA in 1967, due to the domestic political environment, reluctantly agreed. Following the Tet Offensive in early 1968, however, the controversy was revisited. The numbers of enemy combatants were raised to a higher count, more in accord with Adams' original conclusions.

==== Challenging the CIA ====
By then, Adams had resigned his Vietnam post and was doing CIA analysis of neighboring Cambodia. Yet he persisted in advancing the higher count of Viet Cong in the 'Order of Battle' controversy, despite the institutional fallout between CIA and MACV. He claimed that the CIA had compromised its integrity. He filed formal charges against DCI Richard Helms. He became notorious to many in the agency, and acquired a general reputation as a "gadfly, pariah and nemesis."

In 1969 Adams, fearing that his opponents would destroy them, secretly removed CIA files and documents which would support his case. He buried them in the woods near his 250-acre (1.0 km^{2}) farm in rural Virginia. His 1973 testimony in federal court, where he restated his position on the 'Order of Battle' numbers, caused consternation at CIA. Following this trial, he retired from the agency.

== In the media, and testimony ==
Outside the CIA Adams continued to advance the issues stemming from the 'Order of Battle' controversy. In particular, the tailoring of 'pure' intelligence in order to fit the political agenda of its primary consumers: the American government, and its chief executive.

=== Trial of Ellsberg and Russo ===
Adams appeared as a defense witness at the 1973 trial of Daniel Ellsberg and Anthony J. Russo. The case involved their role in the unauthorized publication of the top secret Pentagon Papers, a 47-volume, government-produced, secret history of the Vietnam War. The prosecution alleged felony violations of the Espionage Act of 1917, and of signed secrecy agreements. The charges involved disclosure of government secrets, yet not to foreign powers, but to American newspapers.

Adams testified concerning the military's false numbers for Viet Cong combatants. The undercounting had been deliberately adopted by the American intelligence community as official. His testimony was offered to show that supposed 'secret information' in the text of the Pentagon Papers contained in reality many fictions.

The trial was held at the U.S. District Court in Los Angeles. Eventually, citing the "totality" of government misconduct, Federal judge William Matthew Byrne Jr. dismissed all charges against Ellsberg and Russo.

=== Article on CIA in Harper's ===
Adams did additional research. Fearful that his opponents would destroy evidence, he had already removed files and documents from the CIA, hiding them on a farm in rural Virginia. He also scouted out former contacts and CIA employees in order to bolster his cause. After his resignation from the agency in 1973, he sought the support of other intelligence officials to prove that there was a Saigon cover-up. He detailed his allegations in an article sent to Harper's Magazine. In 1975, in its May issue, Harper's published his article, "Vietnam Cover-Up: Playing war with numbers". Adams brought his cause to the public.

As a result of the 'cover-up' article, Adams was sought out for further comments.

=== House Intelligence Committee ===
Adams gave sworn testimony before the Pike Committee, of the House of Representatives. This committee was holding hearings during the latter half of 1975. Although it shed needed light on the secret operations of CIA, it also acquired controversy. His remarks were welcomed; Adams and the House Pike committee on intelligence reached similar conclusions.

=== CBS Vietnam documentary ===
In 1982 Adams provided critical evidence to CBS News reporters who made the documentary The Uncounted Enemy: A Vietnam Deception. He claimed U.S. Army General William C. Westmoreland had conspired to minimize reported enemy troop strength in 1967.

=== Westmoreland v. CBS ===
General Westmoreland in 1982 sued for libel against CBS News, and named as co-defendants the producer George Crile, correspondent Mike Wallace, and consultant Sam Adams. The case, Westmoreland v. CBS, went to trial but ended in a private, out-of-court settlement.

Adams testified "concerning the intelligence gathering and reporting of enemy strength." He told the court, "I believe there was a conspiracy. There was an attempt to do wrong with the numbers... . I have always felt that what went on in the 1967–1968 period was a conspiracy." Adams also stated, "I do not believe Gen. Westmoreland communicated fully to Washington."

Numerous officers who had served in MACV intelligence in 1967 testified, on one side or the other, at the trial. The most senior were then Brigadier General (later Lieutenant General) Phillip Davidson (MACV J-2--overall chief of intelligence) and Colonel (later Lieutenant General) Daniel O. Graham (chief of MACV intelligence estimates) as witnesses for Westmoreland; and Major General (later Lieutenant General) Joseph A. McChristian (Davidson's predecessor as MACV J-2) and Col. Gains Hawkins (chief of MACV's O/B section) as witnesses for CBS. The MACV O/B ('Order of Battle') estimate was "undercut" by "latter admissions" at trial that

[The officers] had known at the time that General Westmoreland's insistence on an O/B total of no more than 300,000 was an artificial position dictated by political considerations, and that the true number of enemy forces had almost certainly been much higher.

The trial had been going on for eighteen weeks, and was approaching its end, when the parties negotiated and reached agreement. Evidently it was testimony "by his former chief of military intelligence" in Vietnam, which agreed more with Adams, that convinced Westmoreland to settle. The General received no money, but in a public statement each side expressed respect for the other.

The lawsuit ended in February 1985. In May 1993, Westmoreland appeared on NBC's The Today Show. He discussed the Vietnam War in 1967–68, and opined that the true calamity of the Tet Offensive was its surprise, because the public did not know the VC's real strength. "And if I had to do it over again, I would have called a press conference and made known to the media the intelligence we had."

=== War of Numbers ===
Adams worked on his revising his memoirs at his home in Vermont. The book was published posthumously.=

- Sam Adams, War of Numbers: An Intelligence Memoir (South Royalton, Vermont: Steerforth Press, 1994). ISBN 9781883642235
- War of Numbers: An Intelligence Memoir of the Vietnam War's Uncounted Enemy (1998). Steerforth; 1st edition ISBN 978-1883642464

== Death and legacy ==
Adams died of an apparent heart attack on October 10, 1988, at his home in Strafford. He was married twice and had two sons.

The Sam Adams Award for integrity in intelligence, given since 2002, is named after Adams.
