= Westmoreland v. CBS =

1982 U.S. libel lawsuit

Westmoreland v. CBS was a $120 million libel suit brought in 1982 by former U.S. Army Chief of Staff General William Westmoreland against CBS for broadcasting on its program CBS Reports the documentary The Uncounted Enemy: A Vietnam Deception. Westmoreland also sued the documentary's narrator, investigative reporter Mike Wallace; the producer, investigative journalist and best-selling author George Crile, and the former Central Intelligence Agency (CIA) analyst Sam Adams, who originally broke the story on which the broadcast was based.

Westmoreland's claims were governed by the landmark 1964 New York Times Co. v. Sullivan decision, which held that, in order to recover for defamation, a "public figure" like Westmoreland must prove that the defendant made the statements in question with "actual malice" (essentially, with knowledge, or reckless disregard, of falsity).

The suit was originally filed in a federal district court in South Carolina, but it was transferred to the United States District Court for the Southern District of New York. The trial ended in February 1985 when the case was settled out of court shortly before it would have gone to the jury.

== Circumstances ==
U.S. Army General William C. Westmoreland served in Vietnam as COMUSMACV—Commander US Military Assistance Command Vietnam for four years (1964–1968) during the Vietnam War. He was in command during the Tet Offensive, a surprise, country-wide attack on the US forces by the combined forces of the National Front for the Liberation of South Vietnam and the Vietnam People's Army in 1968. The attack is widely viewed as having contributed to a growing perception in the United States that the US had underestimated enemy strength and resolve, and that, in contrast to assurances from Westmoreland and the Johnson administration, there was no "light at the end of the tunnel." Television journalist Walter Cronkite visited Vietnam in February 1968, in the immediate aftermath of Tet, and returned home and gave his famous "mired in a stalemate" on-air editorial. "To say that we are closer to victory today is to believe, in the face of the evidence, the optimists who have been wrong in the past. To suggest we are on the edge of defeat is to yield to unreasonable pessimism. To say that we are mired in stalemate seems the only realistic, yet unsatisfactory, conclusion." Several weeks later, US President Lyndon Johnson announced that he would not seek reelection.

CBS broadcast the documentary on January 23, 1982. It contended that Westmoreland had contributed to the public reaction to Tet by manipulating intelligence about enemy strength in order to create the impression of progress. Westmoreland contended that politics had not influenced the intelligence reports of his command. Intelligence officers working under Westmoreland and contemporaneous classified documents supported the documentary's contention that Army intelligence in Westmoreland's command had been manipulated for political purposes. Other officers denied any such manipulation.

Shortly after trial in the Westmoreland case began, another famous libel trial got underway in the same federal court house by former Israeli Defense Minister Ariel Sharon's suit against Time magazine. Sharon challenged one passage in a lengthy article detailing the findings of the official Israeli investigation into Sharon's responsibility for the Sabra and Shatila Massacre of Palestinians by Phalangist forces during the Israeli invasion of Lebanon in 1982. On January 25, 1985, the jury in the Sharon case found for the defendant while the Westmoreland v. CBS trial was still in progress. The Sharon jury stated that Time acted "negligently and carelessly" but did not find evidence of actual malice.

== Summary judgment motion ==
CBS made a motion for a summary judgment, claiming immunity from libel for doing a commentary on a public figure under the precedent established in New York Times v. Sullivan. At the onset, the presiding judge ruled that under New York Times Co. v. Sullivan and the First Amendment, Westmoreland, as a public figure, must prove by "clear and convincing evidence" that CBS acted with actual malice in gathering the evidence and putting it together in the documentary. This is legally a heavy burden of proof and a higher standard than a nonpublic figure would need to sue for defamation.

== Trial ==
A conservative public-interest law firm, Capital Legal Foundation, brought the suit on September 13, 1982, on Westmoreland's behalf, and its president, Dan Burt, served as Westmoreland's pro bono attorney. The suit was funded by grants from several conservative organizations, such as the Richard Mellon Scaife Foundation, the John M. Olin Foundation, and the Smith Richardson Foundation whose goals were to kill CBS Reports and turn back the 1964 New York Times v. Sullivan rule. CBS's defense was led by David Boies of the firm Cravath, Swaine & Moore.

If Westmoreland had sued where he lived, in Charleston, South Carolina, the case would probably have been tried there, but he chose to go to the other side of the state and file his suit in the federal district court in Greenville, SC. CBS's attorneys pointed out that nobody in any way involved with the case lived anywhere near Greenville, and got the case transferred to New York.

Westmoreland's case went to trial in October 1984. Westmoreland charged that the investigators asked biased and slanted questions, selectively edited interviews (for example, giving a two-minute excerpt of a 90-minute interview and portraying that selection as representative), and selectively chose persons to interview supportive of CBS's point of view. He also charged CBS with editing interview tapes dishonestly and taking statements out of context. Westmoreland charged CBS with reckless misstatements of evidence and contended these distortions indicated malice. The allegations about editing were not borne out by the evidence and the ultimate questions at trial became whether the allegations against Westmoreland were true and whether CBS was entitled to believe the high-ranking military officers who made those allegations in their interviews and stuck by them at trial.

CBS defended the documentary as true and called the military officers in question as witnesses at trial. They testified both at deposition and at trial that their criticisms of Westmoreland had been fairly represented in the documentary and they stood by them. Major General Joseph McChristian, Assistant Chief of Staff for Intelligence under Westmoreland, testified at trial that when he had presented new increased enemy strength estimates, Westmoreland had responded that sending these figures to Washington would "create a political bombshell" and would "embarrass my commander in chief [President Johnson]." General McChristian testified that, in withholding these figures, Westmoreland, "in being loyal to the President, was disloyal to his country." McChristian's testimony has been seen as a "dramatic, consequential, and determinative of the outcome."

After McChristian stepped down, CBS called another military intelligence officer, Col. Gains Hawkins, who had worked under McChristian and Westmoreland. Hawkins's testimony supported McChristian's; Hawkins reaffirmed his allegations in his CBS interviews and in the documentary.

Westmoreland's counsel, Dan M. Burt, had been hoping for a simple verdict from the jury, finding for Westmoreland or CBS; that way, if Westmoreland lost, he could claim that the jury concluded that the documentary was false, but under the strict legal standard had been unable to find that CBS had acted with "actual malice." When the trial court judge, Pierre N. Leval, informed counsel that he intended to ask the jury to render separate verdicts on truth, actual malice, and injury, Burt told the Judge he was concerned, because "If he loses on truth, it will kill the old man." After the conference with the Judge, Burt met with Westmoreland, and the two men agreed to pursue settlement.

On February 18, 1985, shortly after McChristian's testimony, with Col. Hawkins still on the stand, and with the five-month trial expected to go to the jury within days, Westmoreland agreed to dismiss the case without payment, retraction or apology from CBS. Both sides agreed to pay their own legal fees, and Westmoreland and CBS released simultaneous public statements. CBS stated that it had never intended to say that "General Westmoreland was unpatriotic or disloyal in performing his duties as he saw them." Westmoreland said "General Westmoreland respects the long and distinguished journalistic tradition of CBS and the rights of journalists to examine the complex issues of Vietnam and to present perspectives contrary to his own."

Westmoreland declared "victory," but later conceded that his team's "jury watcher" had concluded he was likely to lose. The New York Times reported that Westmoreland had "surrendered to the evidence that...he and some of his aides in Vietnam in 1967 manipulated the estimates of enemy strength, apparently for political effect." "At the end, he stood in imminent danger of having a jury confirm the essential truth of the CBS report. For, in court, as on the original program, the general could not get past the testimony of high-ranking former subordinates who confirmed his having colored some intelligence information." One of the jurors, speaking to the press when the trial adjourned, stated "The evidence in favor of CBS was overwhelming."

== Significance ==
Westmoreland's decision to dismiss the case before the jury reached a decision prevented an appeal that might have created a legal landmark. Instead, this high-profile case provided a practical demonstration of what many already understood— that any public figure seeking damages for libel must follow the stringent standards set in the precedent of New York Times v. Sullivan. Further, a public figure must prove actual malice, as required by New York Times Co. v. Sullivan, even in the face of allegations of media misconduct.

Finally, the case demonstrated an old adage: bringing a libel suit is generally a poor way to burnish a reputation. Westmoreland's suit brought greater attention to the CBS documentary and its allegations against him; the testimony of high-ranking military officers at trial provided further support for those allegations, in a highly public forum. Allegations that otherwise might have been forgotten are now part of any Westmoreland biography.

On the other hand, the lawsuit emboldened wealthy companies and political foundations to sue or threaten to sue in order to counteract unfavorable or deceptive press reports. In 1993, General Motors sued NBC over a Dateline report in which NBC producers had staged an explosion with model rocket engines in order to claim that the fuel tanks on GM trucks were unsafe. In response, NBC management fired the news director and producer and issued a public apology in exchange for GM dropping the suit. In 1994, Philip Morris sued ABC News for an unprecedented $10 billion over the Day One report “Smoke Screen” which exposed their manipulation of nicotine levels, but the case was settled without trial and with an apology. In 1995, the Brown & Williamson tobacco company threatened to sue CBS over a 60 Minutes interview of whistleblower Jeffrey Wigand who exposed a similar manipulation of nicotine, but CBS chose to pull the segment.

== See also ==
- Broadcast Music v. Columbia Broadcasting System (1979)
- Estate of Martin Luther King, Jr., Inc. v. CBS, Inc. (11th Cir. 1999)
- The Uncounted Enemy
