= The Twentieth Century =

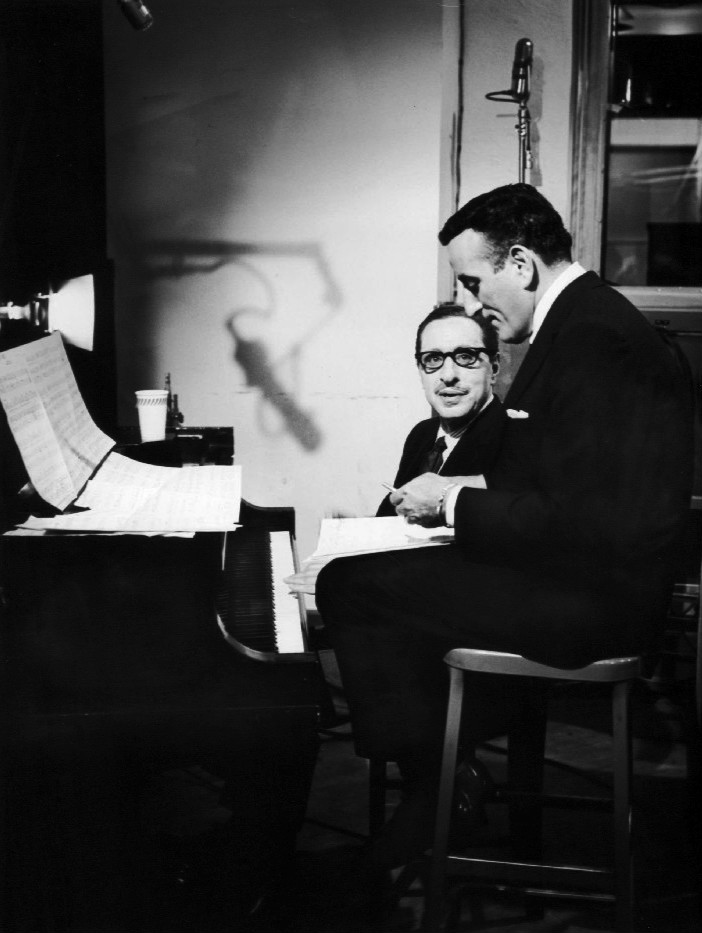
- Composer Harold Arlen and singer Tony Bennett rehearsing for a 1964 program about Arlen's works
- Genre: Documentary
- Written by: Earle Luby
- Directed by: Peter Poor (1961-1966); Willard Van Dyke (1961-1965); Nicholas Webster (1960-1965); Wade Bingham (1961); Robert K. Sharpe (1961-1963); Av Westin (1961-1962); Harry Rasky (1963); Burton Benjamin (1964); Earle Luby (1966)
- Narrated by: Walter Cronkite
- Theme music composer: George Antheil
- Composers: Many contemporary classical and film composers
- Country of origin: United States
- Original language: English
- No. of seasons: 9
- No. of episodes: 219

Production
- Executive producer: Burton Benjamin
- Producers: Burton Benjamin; Isaac Kleinerman
- Running time: 30 minutes
- Production company: CBS News

Original release
- Network: CBS
- Release: October 20, 1957 – 1966

Related
- The 21st Century (1967-1970); The 20th Century with Mike Wallace (1994-2005)

The Twentieth Century was a documentary television program that ran on the CBS network from 1957 until 1966. The series produced 112 historical compilation films and 107 "originally photographed documentaries" or contemporary documentaries, each running a half-hour. Productions were narrated by Walter Cronkite and drew on the resources of CBS News. The compilations mixed newsreel footage and eyewitness interviews, focusing on great events, unfamiliar historical episodes, and biographical portraits, including contemporary figures in the arts, sciences, law, and politics. As the series progressed, the compilation films were gradually outnumbered by the contemporary documentaries, similar to the work being done in the CBS Reports series, but often treating social and political change overseas rather than in the U.S. Popular and critically acclaimed, audiences averaged 13 million viewers a week, and the series was an influential forerunner to many subsequent television documentary series.

The program was sponsored during its entire run by the Prudential Insurance Company, whose Rock of Gibraltar symbol was often the backdrop for the opening and closing credits. The company approved the topics and limited the treatment of issues it felt to be potentially upsetting to a large audience, particularly social and religious subjects. Prudential—and the Department of Defense, which provided film footage and cooperation for many episodes—also wanted an uncritical portrayal of the U.S. military. Prudential withdrew sponsorship after the ninth season when sports programming seriously cut into the number of its 6 pm Sunday time slots, and contemporary subjects came to dominate productions.

The series’ theme music, in which a ragtime-tinged orchestral cacophony abruptly changes to a triumphal contemporary march, was famous in its day. Aired in several versions, it was written by the erstwhile avant-garde composer George Antheil and is arguably his most heard work. The loud, stirring orchestral movement "Simple Gifts" from Aaron Copland's "Appalachian Spring" was also used. (The theme never had an on-screen credit and has been available only on copies of the original broadcasts.) Many episodes had original scores commissioned from a wide range of contemporary classical and film composers, including Antheil, Auric, Creston, Gould, Hovhaness, Kay, Kubik, Milhaud, Nascimbene, Rosenthal, Shapero, Siegmeister, Tcherepnin, and Waxman. Alfredo Antonini composed half the scores and led the CBS Orchestra in performances.

== Successor series ==
The series was replaced in 1967 with a spin-off, The 21st Century. Produced by many of The Twentieth Century team and narrated by Cronkite, the new series focused on what humankind could shape and expect by examining aspects of the future already evident in the present. It was sponsored by Union Carbide ("The Discovery Company"). The 21st Century ran only three seasons (its final broadcast was on 4 January 1970). The reason given was that the writers had run out of topics, but CBS may have wanted a more commercially successful program.

The original program concept was revived in 1994 with The 20th Century with Mike Wallace. The new series was produced by CBS News Productions in association with A&E Network and premiered on The History CChannel.166 episodes were produced and aired during 1994-2005. eter Fish arranged, adapted, and extended the original theme music, for which Antheil remained uncredited.
