= Broadcast Music, Inc. v. CBS Inc. =

- Supreme Court of the United States

Argued January 15, 1979 Decided April 17, 1979
- Full case name: Broadcast Music, Inc., et al. v. Columbia Broadcasting System, Inc., et al.
- Citations: 441 U.S. 1 (more) 99 S. Ct. 1551; 60 L. Ed. 2d 1; 201 U.S.P.Q. 497

Case history
- Prior: CBS Inc. v. Am. Soc'y of Composers, Authors & Publishers, 562 F.2d 130, 195 U.S.P.Q. 209 (2d Cir. 1977); cert. granted, 439 U.S. 817 (1978).

Holding
- The issuance by ASCAP and BMI of blanket licenses does not constitute price-fixing per se unlawful under the antitrust laws.

Court membership
- Chief Justice Warren E. Burger Associate Justices William J. Brennan Jr. · Potter Stewart; Byron White · Thurgood Marshall; Harry Blackmun · Lewis F. Powell Jr. William Rehnquist · John P. Stevens

Case opinions
- Majority: White, joined by Burger, Brennan, Stewart, Marshall, Blackmun, Powell, Rehnquist
- Dissent: Stevens

Broadcast Music Inc. v. Columbia Broadcasting System Inc., 441 U.S. 1 (1979), was an important antitrust case decided by the Supreme Court of the United States. It examined a complaint brought by CBS affiliates that the method in which broadcast companies determine fees for the issuance of blanket licenses (the permission to use a set of copyrighted media materials) was a violation of the Sherman Antitrust Act. The Supreme Court ruled that the issuance of blanket licenses was not a violation of the act, holding that the nature of blanket licenses did not arise to price fixing.

== Background ==
The TV network CBS (also, at the time, owner of Columbia Records) filed an antitrust suit against licensing agencies alleging that the system by which these agencies received fees for the issuance of blanket licenses to perform copyrighted musical compositions amounted to illegal price fixing.

The basic question in the case is "whether the issuance by ASCAP and BMI to CBS of blanket licenses to copyrighted musical compositions at fees negotiated by them is price fixing per se unlawful under the antitrust laws."

== Judgment ==
The Supreme Court held that blanket licenses issued by ASCAP and BMI did not necessarily constitute price fixing. The judgment, delivered by White J, was unanimous in holding that such practice should instead be examined under the rule of reason to determine if it is unlawful. Stevens J agreed with the majority, but would not have remanded the case to the lower courts for rehearing. He would have held that the blanket license were a breach of § 1 of the Sherman Act using the rule of reason.

== Significance ==
The case was part of the court's retreat from applying rigid per se rules in antitrust to a more permissive rule of reason.

== See also ==
- US antitrust law
- Westmoreland v. CBS (S.D.N.Y. 1982)
- Estate of Martin Luther King, Jr., Inc. v. CBS, Inc. (11th Cir. 1999)
