= Estate of Martin Luther King, Jr., Inc. v. CBS, Inc. =

United states court case

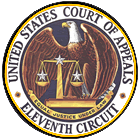
- Court: United States Court of Appeals for the Eleventh Circuit
- Full case name: Estate of Martin Luther King, Jr., Inc. v. CBS, Inc.
- Decided: November 5 1999
- Citation: 194 F.3d 1211 (11th Cir. 1999)

Court membership
- Judges sitting: R. Lanier Anderson III, Paul Hitch Roney, Julian Abele Cook Jr. (E.D. Mich.)

Case opinions
- Majority: Anderson
- Concurrence: Cook
- Dissent: Roney

Estate of Martin Luther King, Jr., Inc. v. CBS, Inc. (194 F.3d 1211 (11th Cir. 1999)) is a United States court case that involved a longstanding dispute about the public domain copyright status of the text of Martin Luther King Jr.'s famous speech, known by the key phrase "I Have a Dream", originally delivered at the August 1963 March on Washington for Jobs and Freedom. The court ruled that King's delivery of the speech was a "performance", rather than a "general publication", of its text, and therefore overruled a lower court judgment granting summary judgment in CBS's favor. The two sides ultimately settled the matter out of court instead of appealing to a higher court.

== The facts ==
The facts of the underlying dispute are as follows: when King delivered his speech publicly to a large audience, both live and televised, its text had not been submitted to the Register of Copyright to obtain federal copyright protection. Under state law, common law copyright subsisted only before publication of the work. Therefore, it was argued that the work had been published to the general public when he delivered the speech, with extensive media coverage, and by so doing the text of his speech entered the public domain and could be freely copied and distributed by third parties However, King registered the text of his speech the next month as being an unpublished work and after his death his estate filed this lawsuit in order to enforce the copyright.

This litigation began after CBS refused to pay King's estate royalties for using footage from King's "I Have a Dream" speech in a segment of its documentary series 20th Century with Mike Wallace, which was produced in collaboration with the A&E Network.

== The ruling ==
The United States Court of Appeals for the Eleventh Circuit ruled that the public performance of his speech did not constitute "general publication" and thus by giving this speech in public he did not forfeit his copyright in its text. Thus, King's estate is able to require a license fee for redistribution of the speech's text, whether in a television program, a history book, a dramatic re-enactment, or otherwise.

== Legal analysis ==
The case is analyzed under the previous copyright law, the Copyright Act of 1909 ("1909 Act"), rather than the Copyright Act of 1976 ("1976 Act") as the previous act was in force when the facts arose. Under the 1909 statute common law copyright subsisted until a work was published. Contrary to modern US practices and the Berne Convention, statutory copyright under the 1909 Act could only be obtained by completing the necessary copyright formalities, in other words, by registering the work with the Registrar of Copyrights in Washington, D.C.. CBS argued that Dr. King had not complied with the statute, and thus, by performing the work, he essentially granted it to the public domain. He had also distributed copies of the text to the press before he delivered the speech. His estate argued to the contrary that the work had never been published at the time of its initial performance by Dr. King and thus retained common law copyright. The public performance of the work did not constitute a "general publication" of the work but rather was a "limited publication" that did not divest common law rights.

=== General v. limited publication ===
There are two ways in which a general publication may occur. First, a general publication occurs if tangible copies of the work are distributed to the general public in such a manner as allows the public to exercise dominion and control over the work. Second, a general publication may occur if the work is exhibited or displayed in such a manner as to permit unrestricted copying by the general public.

=== Distribution to the news media ===
Case law also shows that distribution to the news media (as King had done with the text of the speech), as opposed to the general public, for the purpose of enabling the reporting of a contemporary newsworthy event, is only a limited publication.

From the judgment of the 11th Circuit Court of Appeals:

"A performance, no matter how broad the audience, is not a publication; to hold otherwise would be to upset a long line of precedent. This conclusion is not altered by the fact that the Speech was broadcast live to a broad radio and television audience and was the subject of extensive contemporaneous news coverage. We follow the above cited case law indicating that release to the news media for contemporary coverage of a newsworthy event is only a limited publication."

== Concurring reasons ==
The main judgment was given by Chief Judge Anderson and Senior Circuit Judges Roney and Cook.

Judge Cook gave separate concurring reasons. He did not accept the limited v. general publication rule as being determinative; his thinking centered on the fact that no tangible copy without a copyright notice, which the law then required, was distributed before the registration of the work. That fact and the oral speech being distributed to the media both determined that the copyright was not put into the public domain.

== Outcome ==
The ruling that the copyright was in force meant that the case was remanded to the district court and the Estate's lawsuit against CBS could proceed. CBS and the King Estate reached a settlement before proceeding further in the courts.

== See also ==
- "Desiderata", a poem whose copyright was forfeited due to free distribution
- Broadcast Music v. Columbia Broadcasting System
- Westmoreland v. CBS
