= 20th Century with Mike Wallace =

- Genre: Documentary
- Presented by: Mike Wallace
- Theme music composer: Arranged by Peter Fish
- Country of origin: United States
- Original language: English
- No. of episodes: 163

Production
- Executive producer: Sam Roberts
- Producer: Lee Cohen
- Editor: Judith Starr Wolfe
- Running time: 60 minutes (nominal; non-commercial content about 47 minutes)
- Production company: CBS News Productions

Original release
- Network: The History Channel
- Release: 1994 – 2005

Related
- The Twentieth Century

The 20th Century with Mike Wallace is a documentary television program produced by CBS News Productions in association with A&E Network. It aired on The History Channel from approximately 1994–2005. It was hosted by veteran CBS correspondent and anchor Mike Wallace. The series title and concept were taken from the CBS documentary series, The Twentieth Century, which aired from 1957 to 1966.

The program used footage gathered by CBS crews and contemporary reporting by CBS correspondents to document great events and movements of the 20th century, mainly the latter decades of that era. The range of topics is suggested by some of the program titles — "Underwater: The Great [Mississippi River] Flood of '93" (no. 52, 1996-04-10); "Coming home: Agent Orange and the Gulf War Syndrome" (no. 91, 1998-11-18); "Search for Peace in the Middle East" (no. 106, 1998-12-14); "China after Mao" (no. 116, 1999-03-05).

== See also ==
- Estate of Martin Luther King, Jr., Inc. v. CBS, Inc.
