= CBS Reports =

Television series

- Also known as: CBSN Originals (2016–2021)
- Genre: Documentary; News magazine
- Presented by: see below
- Country of origin: United States
- Original languages: English; Spanish
- No. of seasons: 4
- No. of episodes: 49

Production
- Producers: Andrew Bast; Erica Brown; Chrissy Hallowell; Michael Kaplan; Jessica Kegu; Justin Sherman
- News editor: Lauren Giordano
- Camera setup: Single-camera
- Running time: 1 hour
- Production company: CBS News Production

Original release
- Network: CBS
- Release: October 27, 1959 – January 2010

CBS Reports is the umbrella title used for documentaries by CBS News which aired starting in 1959 through the 1990s. The series sometimes aired as a wheel series rotating with 60 Minutes (or other similar CBS News series), as a series of its own, or as specials. The program aired as a constant series from 1959 to 1971.

== Origin ==
CBS Reports premiered on October 27, 1959. It was intended to be a successor to Edward R. Murrow's influential See It Now, which had ended 15 months prior, and employed several members of the See It Now production staff. For the remainder of 1959 and through 1960, CBS Reports was broadcast on an irregular basis as a series of specials.

The network gave CBS Reports a regular primetime slot in January 1961, at 10 p.m. (EST) on Thursdays. That placed it against two "tremendously popular" established shows, The Untouchables on ABC and Sing Along With Mitch on NBC. Consequently, CBS Reports was pre-empted by a high number of CBS affiliates that aired local programming in its timeslot.

When the networks announced their Fall 1962 schedules, Sing Along With Mitch and The Untouchables had been moved from the Thursday 10 p.m. timeslot. However, CBS also decided to move CBS Reports to Wednesday at 7:30 p.m. (EST), explaining that "the earlier hour will permit more young people to watch the program." But that move again put the program up against two "consistent rating leaders," The Virginian on NBC and Wagon Train on ABC.

CBS Reports continued to lead the network's Wednesday primetime line-up until Fall 1965, when the network placed Lost In Space in the 7:30 p.m. Wednesday timeslot and moved CBS Reports to Tuesday at 10 p.m., opposite The Fugitive on ABC and NBC's Tuesday Night at the Movies.

== Notable episodes ==
CBS Reports received a Peabody Award in 1960 for the episode "Harvest of Shame", which examined the lives of migrant workers in the United States. CBS Reports also received Peabody Awards for Storm Over the Supreme Court, KKK - The Invisible Empire, The Poisoned Air, Hunger in America, The Battle for South Africa, The Boston Goes to China, The Vanishing Family - Crisis in Black America, D-Day, and, in 1979, Roger Mudd's interview with Ted Kennedy.

1961's Biography of a Bookie Joint, which documented an illegal bookmaking establishment in Boston, was nominated for the Primetime Emmy Award for Program of the Year. Boston Police Commissioner Leo J. Sullivan was forced to resign after the episode, which showed members of his department visiting the gambling establishment.

CBS Reports: The Homosexuals, which aired in 1967, was the first time homosexuality was presented on a national network broadcast. "The Homosexuals" was praised for debunking negative stereotypes, but also condemned for generalizations and promoting other stereotypes. LGBT activist Wayne Besen called "The Homosexuals" "the single most destructive hour of antigay propaganda in our nation's history." Gay Power, Gay Politics, which aired in 1980, was also criticized for unfairly misrepresenting a number of sexual issues, reinforcing stereotypes, and making homosexuals appear as threats to public decency. CBS later apologized for manipulating the soundtrack of a speech made by San Francisco Mayor Dianne Feinstein the first time that the LGBT community had received an apology from a major news organization.

In 1982, General William Westmoreland sued George Crile III, Mike Wallace, and CBS for libel after the network aired The Uncounted Enemy, which contended that Westmoreland had manipulated intelligence reports about enemy strength in order to create the impression of progress. Westmoreland dropped his lawsuit, Westmoreland v. CBS; however, CBS lost its libel insurance over the case.

== Revivals ==
The CBS Reports banner was brought back into use in 2009, with the series CBS Reports: Children of the Recession. Instead of being a stand-alone documentary, the new incarnation consisted of reports across all CBS News platforms. Katie Couric led coverage. The series of reports won the a Columbia School of Journalism Alfred DuPont Award. In January 2010, a second Couric-led series aired, CBS Reports: Where America Stands.

In 2016, CBSN streaming service launched CBSN Originals, a documentary series sponsored by pharmaceutical company Pfizer. Adam Yamaguchi, who before joining CBSN served as an executive producer and a correspondent for award-winning Vanguard series on Current TV, became executive producer and a correspondent for the project. Yamaguchi noted in an interview that unlike linear TV, streaming television allows the stories to be as short, or as long, as they need to be and provides incredible creative freedom. The same journalistic rigor is applied to the reporting irrespective of the format and platform.

In 2022, the CBSN Originals project was rebranded as CBS Reports. Each CBS Reports documentary "takes a deep dive into key issues driving national and global conversations. The stories cover a wide range of topics such as the ripple effects of America’s culture wars, climate change, the rise in extremism, the economic shifts impacting communities to countries and the ways technologies are both saving and threatening humanity".

== CBSN Originals/CBS Reports episodes ==
=== Season 1 ===
For the first season Paramount+ website shows four episodes, TV Guide shows five episodes, while CBSN YouTube playlist shows six episodes. The latter has been used for the list below.

Episode Number	Stream date	Episode title	Correspondent	Description	Duration
1	N/A	Les Banlieues: Seeds of Terror	Vladimir Duthiers		8 min
2	March 18, 2016	Molenbeek: Terror recruiting ground	Vladimir Duthiers		8 min
3	April 11, 2016	Terror in Brussels: Hiding in Plain Sight	Vladimir Duthiers		11 min
4	June 2, 2016	Why some Latinos are supporting Donald Trump	Elaine Quijano		49 min
5	November 6, 2016	Big Pot: The Commercial Takeover	Tony Dokoupil		33 min
6	N/A	Haiti: A Homegrown Recovery	Vladimir Duthiers		16 min

=== Season 2 ===
Episode Number	Stream date	Episode title	Correspondent	Description	Duration
1	February 9, 2017	America's CEO: The 45th President	Panel of experts		52 min
2	February 27, 2017	America: Manufacturing Hope	Jamie Yuccas		20 min
3	March 27, 2017	Gender: The Space Between	N/A		31 min
4	May 7, 2017	Nepal : The Lost Girls	Reena Ninan		21 min
5	June 19, 2017	America: Redefining Hope	Jamie Yuccas		1 hr 2 min
6	September 12, 2017	Thicker Than Water	N/A		22 min
7	October 9, 2017	Darien Gap: Desperate Journey to America	Adam Yamaguchi		28 min
8	October 30, 2017	Portland: Race Against the Past	N/A		29 min
9	November 8, 2017	Playing God	Adam Yamaguchi		24 min

=== Season 3 ===
Episode Number	Stream date	Episode title	Correspondent	Description	Duration
1	January 29, 2018	The Wall: A Nation Divided	Mireya Villarreal		26 min
2	February 26, 2018	Weaponizing Social Media: The Rohingya Crisis	Adam Yamaguchi		29 min
3	March 24, 2018	Grassroots in Alabama: An Emerging Women's Movement	N/A		25 min
4	April 29, 2018	Replacing Humans: Robots Among Us	Adam Yamaguchi		35 min
5	May 19, 2018	Adapt or Die	Adam Yamaguchi		22 min
6	June 7, 2018	Seeking Asylum: An Immigrant's Journey to America	Adam Yamaguchi		24 min
7	June 21, 2018	Expedition Antarctica	N/A		27 min
8	July 22, 2018	Out of Aleppo	ByKids		26 min
9	August 24, 2018	Cryptocurrency: Virtual Money, Real Power	Errol Barnett		21 min
10	September 21, 2018	Puerto Rico: The Exodus After Hurricane Maria	David Begnaud		22 min
11	October 24, 2018	Burmese Python Invasion: Fighting Invasive Species	Adam Yamaguchi		27 min
12	November 16, 2018	North Korea: The Art of Surviving Sanctions	Adam Yamaguchi		
13	December 20, 2018	Esports: The Price of the Grind	Errol Barnett		23 min

=== Season 4 ===
Episode Number	Stream date	Episode title	Correspondent	Description	Duration
1	January 17, 2019	Families in crisis: Illegal immigration	Adam Yamaguchi		23 min
2	February 21, 2019	Priced out: L.A.'s hidden homeless	Adam Yamaguchi		25 min (YouTube version: 10 min)
3	March 8, 2019	Zika: Children of the outbreak	Elaine Quijano		23 min
4	March 29, 2019	Border business: Inside immigration	Adam Yamaguchi		38 min
5	April 12, 2019	(Un)Welcome: Sweden's rise of the right	Adam Yamaguchi		23 min
6	April 26, 2019	Sex. Consent. Education			23 min
7	May 10, 2019	Clinging to coal: West Virginia's fight over green jobs	Adam Yamaguchi		24 min
8	May 23, 2019	Period. Half the population has one. But no one talks about it.			22 min
9	June 6, 2019	Trophy hunting: Killing or conservation?	Adam Yamaguchi		24 min
10	June 27, 2019	Fake news, real consequences: The woman fighting disinformation	Adam Yamaguchi		23 min
11	July 11, 2019	Powerless: The high cost of cheap gas			23 min
12	July 26, 2019	A climate reckoning in the heartland	Adam Yamaguchi		23 min
13	August 23, 2019	Kid influencers: Few rules, big money			23 min
14	Sept 5, 2019	Drinking culture: American kids and the danger of being cool			23 min
15	Oct 4, 2019	The perils of private prison health care			25 min
17	Oct 24, 2019	Speaking Frankly: Non-monogamy			23 min
18	Oct 31, 2019	Speaking Frankly: Child Marriage			23 min
19	Nov 14, 2019	Speaking Frankly: Porn			23 min
20	Nov 21, 2019	Speaking Frankly: Title IX			23 min
21	December 5, 2019	Speaking Frankly: Raising Boys			23 min

== See also ==
- CBS Reports - Documentary news series from CBS News
- The 90's (1989-1992)
- Vanguard (2008-2013)
- Fault Lines (2009-2018)
- Vice
