= Joseph A. McChristian =

United States Army general (1914–2005)

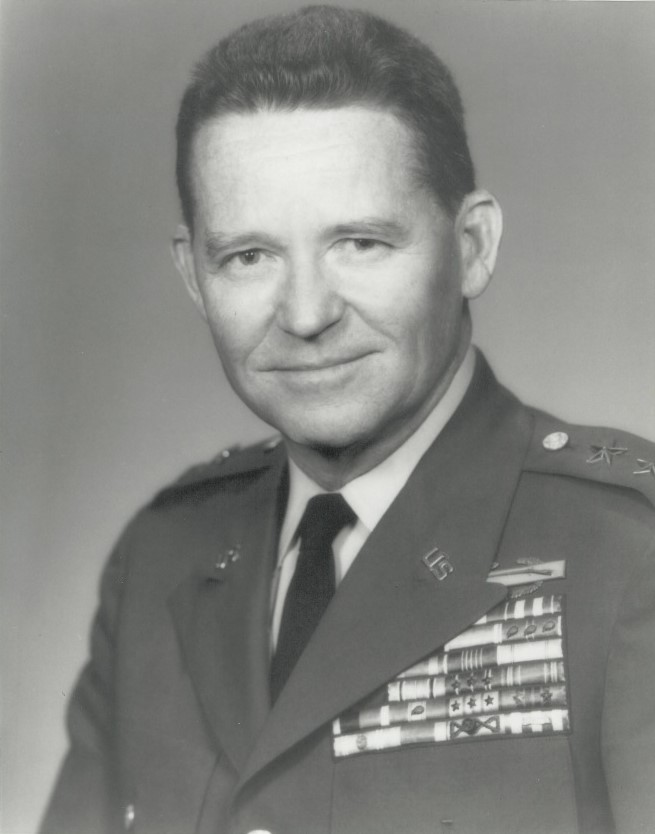
- Born: Joseph Alexander McChristian; October 12, 1914; Chicago, Illinois, US
- Died: May 13, 2005 (aged 90); Jupiter, Florida, US
- Alma mater: United States Military Academy (B.S.)
- Military career
- Allegiance: United States
- Branch: United States Army
- Service years: 1933–1971
- Rank: Major General
- Unit: 10th Armored Division
- Commands: Military Assistance Command, Vietnam
- Conflicts: World War II; Greek Civil War; Korean War; Vietnam War
- Awards: Silver Star; Bronze Star Medal; Distinguished Service Medal; Legion of Merit

Joseph Alexander McChristian (October 12, 1914 – May 13, 2005) was a United States Army Major General and the assistant chief of staff for intelligence, Military Assistance Command, Vietnam (J-2, MACV) (then commanded by General William Westmoreland) from July 13, 1965, to June 1, 1967. As J-2, MACV, he supported an increase in the official estimates of Viet Cong personnel strength in South Vietnam. His view was unpopular because the official policy was optimism, claiming that US and South Vietnamese forces were winning the war.

== Early life and education ==
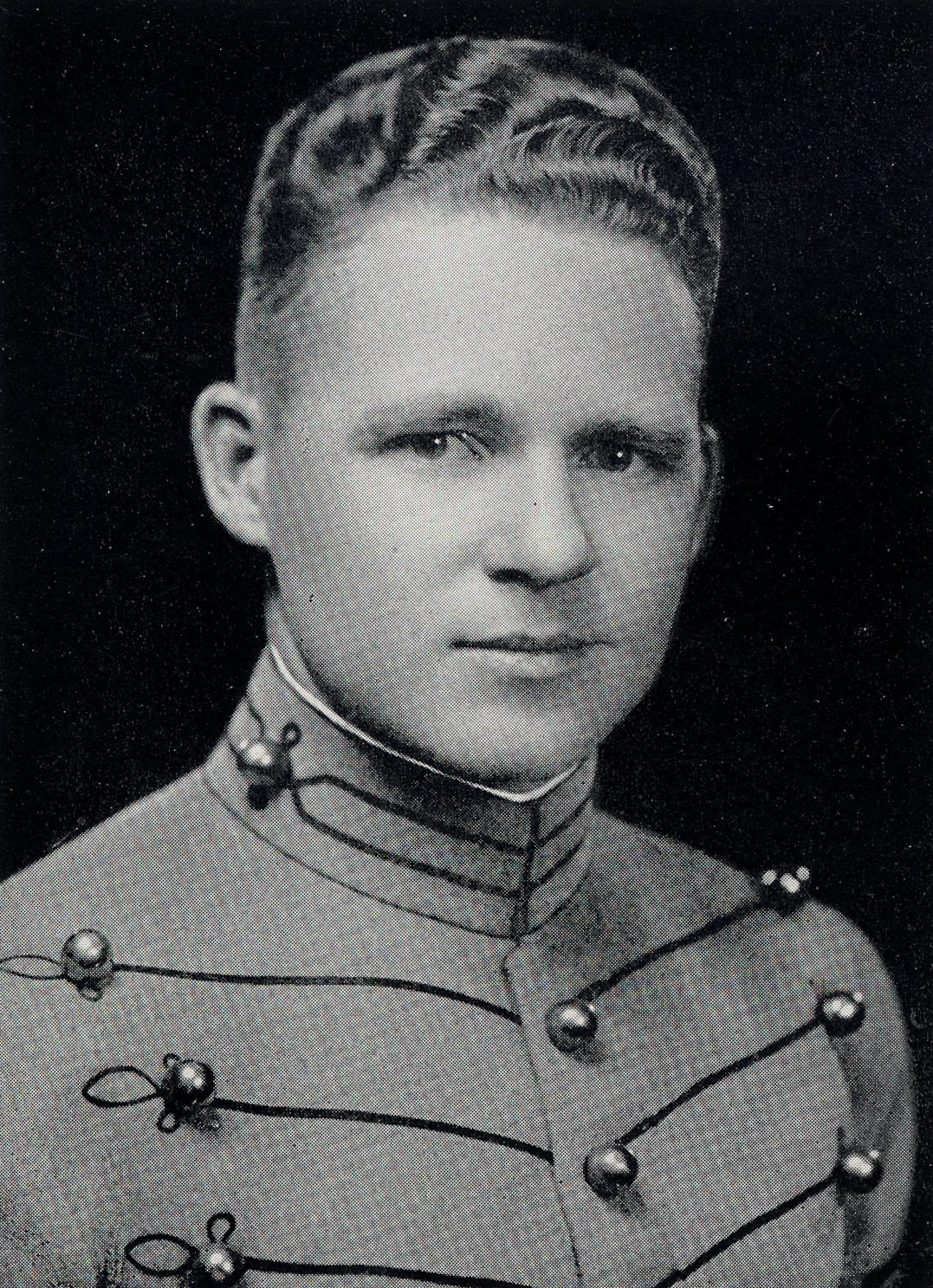
McChristian as a West Point cadet in 1939

Born in Chicago, Illinois, and raised in Miami, Florida, McChristian enlisted in the Army on July 2, 1933. He was subsequently appointed to the United States Military Academy, earning a B.S. degree in 1939. McChristian later graduated from the Armed Forces Staff College in 1951 and the Army War College in 1955.

== Military career ==
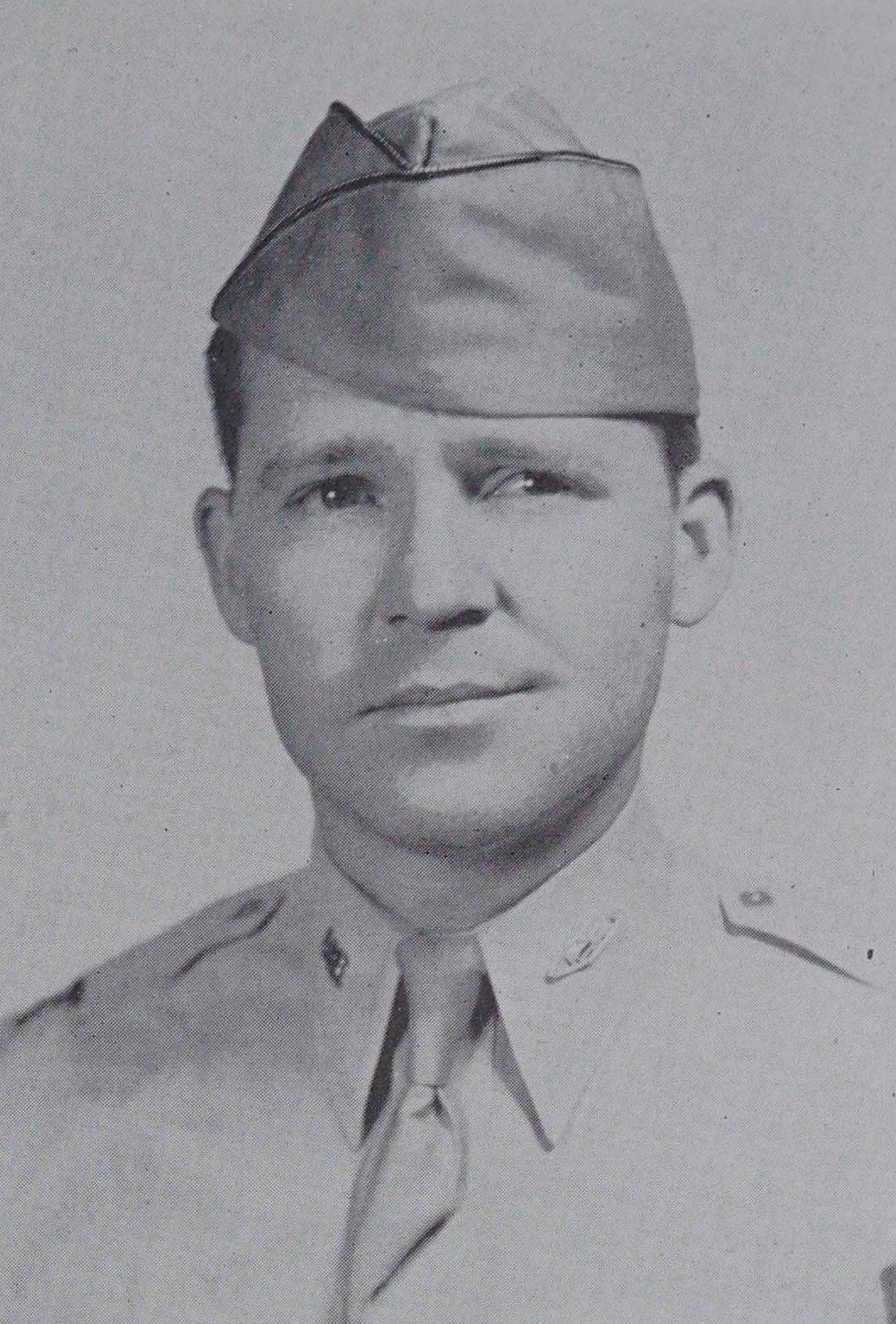
McChristian as Division Headquarters Commandant of the 4th Armored Division c. 1942

During World War II, McChristian served with the 10th Armored Division in Europe, participating in the Battle of the Bulge and Western Allied invasion of Germany. During the war, he earned a Silver Star Medal and four Bronze Star Medals. In 1945 he was appointed a senior intelligence officer of Third Army by General George S. Patton.

From 1949 to 1950, McChristian was a member of the Joint Military Assistance Group in Greece. During the Korean War, he served on the faculty at the Military Academy. After learning Greek, McChristian returned to Greece as Army attaché from 1956 to 1960. From 1960 until 1962 he commanded the Armor Training Center. After that he became a member of the Staff of the Department of the Army where he served in the Intelligence Branch. Between 1963 and 1965 he was the G2 for the US Army, Pacific. The following two years he served in Vietnam as Chief of the J2 (Intelligence) Department of the Military Assistance Command, Vietnam.

In 1967, officers under McChristian decided that in MACV's estimates of enemy personnel strength in South Vietnam the figures for the "Irregular" and "Political" categories were far too low. By May they had persuaded McChristian that their evidence was solid, and he told General Westmoreland he intended to increase the estimates. Westmorland blocked the increase. Long after the war, McChristian was interviewed about this for a CBS Television documentary, "The Uncounted Enemy." When General Westmoreland sued CBS for libel, McChristian testified as a witness for CBS.

Between July 1967 and July 1969 he commanded the 2nd Armored Division. Afterwards until his retirement on April 30, 1971, he was assistant chief of staff for intelligence in the Department of the Army.

McChristian received two Distinguished Service Medals and the Legion of Merit. He is a member of the Military Intelligence Hall of Fame.

== Personal ==
McChristian was the son of Robert Lee McChristian Sr. and Lillian (Alexander) Stone. They were married on June 7, 1910, in New York City, but were divorced in 1929. The family moved to Chicago after their first son was born, and then to Miami after their third son was born. McChristian's older brother Robert Lee McChristian Jr. worked in the sport fishing industry and invented a fishing reel mechanism, while his younger brother Stanley Earl McChristian was a World War II veteran and retired Air Force major.

After his death in Jupiter, Florida, McChristian was buried at Arlington National Cemetery on July 29, 2005. His wife Dempsie Catherine (Van Fleet) McChristian was interred beside him eight years later. She was the daughter of General James A. Van Fleet.
