= The Uncounted Enemy =

1982 television documentary

The Uncounted Enemy: A Vietnam Deception was a controversial television documentary aired as part of the CBS Reports series on January 23, 1982. The 90-minute program, produced by George Crile III and narrated by Mike Wallace, asserted that in 1967 intelligence officers under General William Westmoreland, the commander of Military Assistance Command, Vietnam (MAC-V), had manipulated intelligence estimates in order to show far fewer communist personnel in South Vietnam than there actually were, thereby creating the impression that the Vietnam War was being won.

Samuel A. Adams, a Central Intelligence Agency analyst who had argued in 1967 for higher estimates of communist strength than those MACV was advocating, served as a consultant for the program.

In response, Westmoreland publicly rebuked these claims and demanded 45 minutes of open airtime to rebut them. CBS refused the request, so Westmoreland sued CBS, Crile, Wallace, and Adams for libel on September 13. A conservative public-interest law firm, Capital Legal Foundation, brought the suit on Westmoreland's behalf, and its president, Dan Burt, served as Westmoreland's pro bono attorney. The suit was funded by grants from several conservative organizations, such as the Richard Mellon Scaife Foundation, the John M. Olin Foundation, and the Smith Richardson Foundation whose goals were to kill CBS Reports and turn back the 1964 New York Times v. Sullivan rule, which required that public officials or figures prove actual malice to win a libel suit against the press.

The case went to trial two years later. The trial, Westmoreland v. CBS, was approaching its end in 1985 when Westmoreland suddenly dropped his lawsuit, citing a statement by CBS that Westmoreland interpreted as an apology. CBS did not retract anything that had been said in the broadcast, but stated that it had “never intended to assert, and does not believe, that General Westmoreland was unpatriotic or disloyal in performing his duties as he saw them.” CBS subsequently lost its libel insurance over the case. Additionally, serious, in-depth documentaries became produced far less frequently on CBS and the other two major networks of the time than had been the case during the 1960s and 1970s, a development that perhaps coincides with less aggressive investigative reporting on television on all news programs generally since the time of the suit.

== See also ==
- Order of battle for the Viet Cong
