= William Westmoreland =

United States Army general (1914–2005)

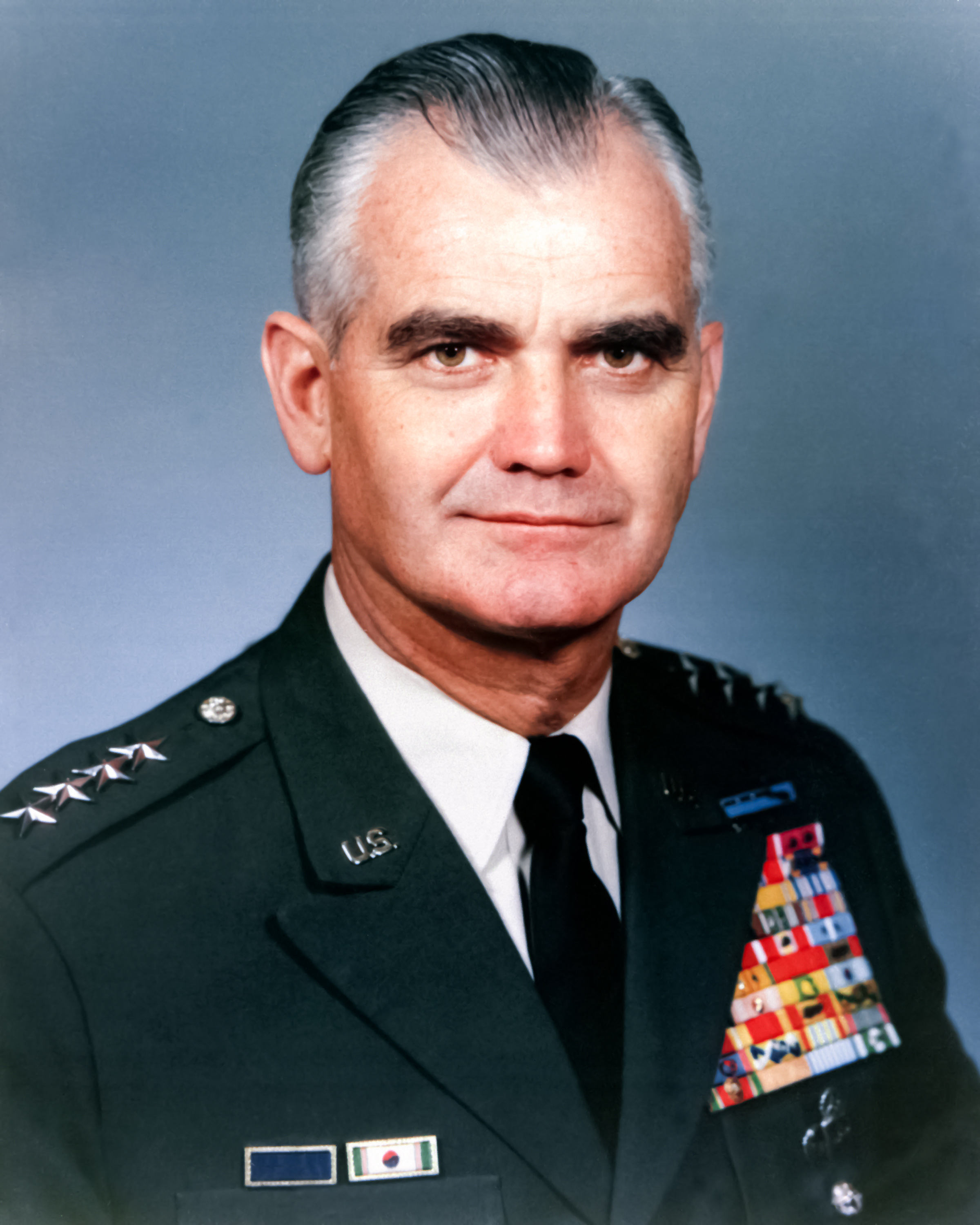
- Westmoreland in 1969
- Born: 26 March 1914; Saxon, South Carolina, U.S.
- Died: 18 July 2005 (aged 91); Charleston, South Carolina, U.S.
- Burial place: West Point Cemetery
- Military career
- Allegiance: United States
- Branch: United States Army
- Service years: 1936–1972
- Rank: General
- Nickname: "Westy"
- Service number: 0-20223
- Commands: Chief of Staff of the United States Army; Military Assistance Command, Vietnam; XVIII Airborne Corps; 101st Airborne Division; 187th Regimental Combat Team; 504th Parachute Infantry Regiment; 34th Field Artillery Battalion; United States Military Academy
- Conflicts: See list: World War II; Operation Torch; Tunisian campaign; Battle of Sicily; Battle of Normandy; Siegfried Line campaign; Battle of the Bulge; Central Europe campaign; Occupation of Germany; Korean War; Vietnam War; Battle of Khe Sanh; Tet Offensive; May Offensive; Battle of Kham Duc
- Awards: Army Distinguished Service Medal (4); Legion of Merit (3); Bronze Star Medal; Eulji Order of Military Merit; Taegeuk Order of Military Merit

Signature
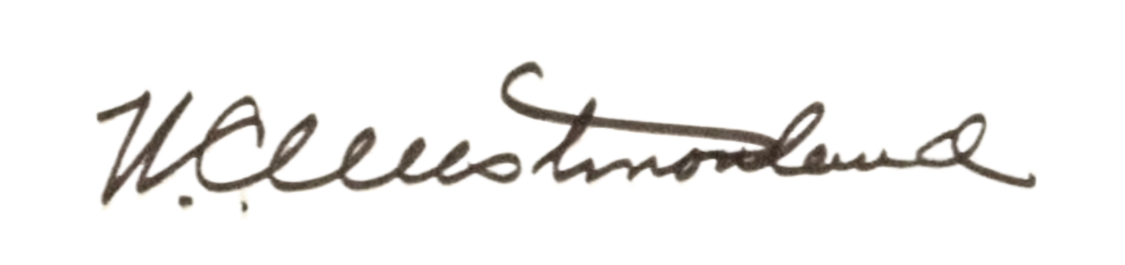

William Childs Westmoreland (26 March 1914 – 18 July 2005) was a United States Army general, most notably the commander of United States forces during the Vietnam War from 1964 to 1968. He later served as Chief of Staff of the United States Army from 1968 to 1972.

Born into a prosperous family in Upstate South Carolina, he demonstrated leadership abilities from an early age as a Boy Scout and attended the US Military Academy in West Point, graduating at the top of his class in 1936. He excelled during his service in the European theater during World War II, and in the Korean War, leading to him becoming one of the youngest general officers of the time. After returning from Korea, he continued to climb the ranks within the army, serving as Superintendent of West Point from 1960 to 1963.

Following the French defeat at Dien Bien Phu in 1954, American involvement in Vietnam steadily escalated, beginning with combat advisors. Westmoreland was sent to South Vietnam in January 1964, and took command of Military Assistance Command, Vietnam (MACV) in June. In Vietnam, Westmoreland adopted a strategy of attrition against the Viet Cong and the North Vietnamese People's Army of Vietnam, to drain them of manpower and supplies. He used artillery and air power on a huge scale.

As time went on and success was not gained, public support for the war diminished, especially after the Battle of Khe Sanh and the surprise Tet Offensive in 1968. By the time he had left his command, American military forces in Vietnam had reached a peak of 535,000 personnel. Westmoreland's strategy was ultimately unsuccessful, due to growing American casualties and reliance on conscription, which undermined support for the war and weakened South Vietnamese support. Historians continue to debate his effectiveness as a commander and his emphasis on body count.

== Early life and education ==
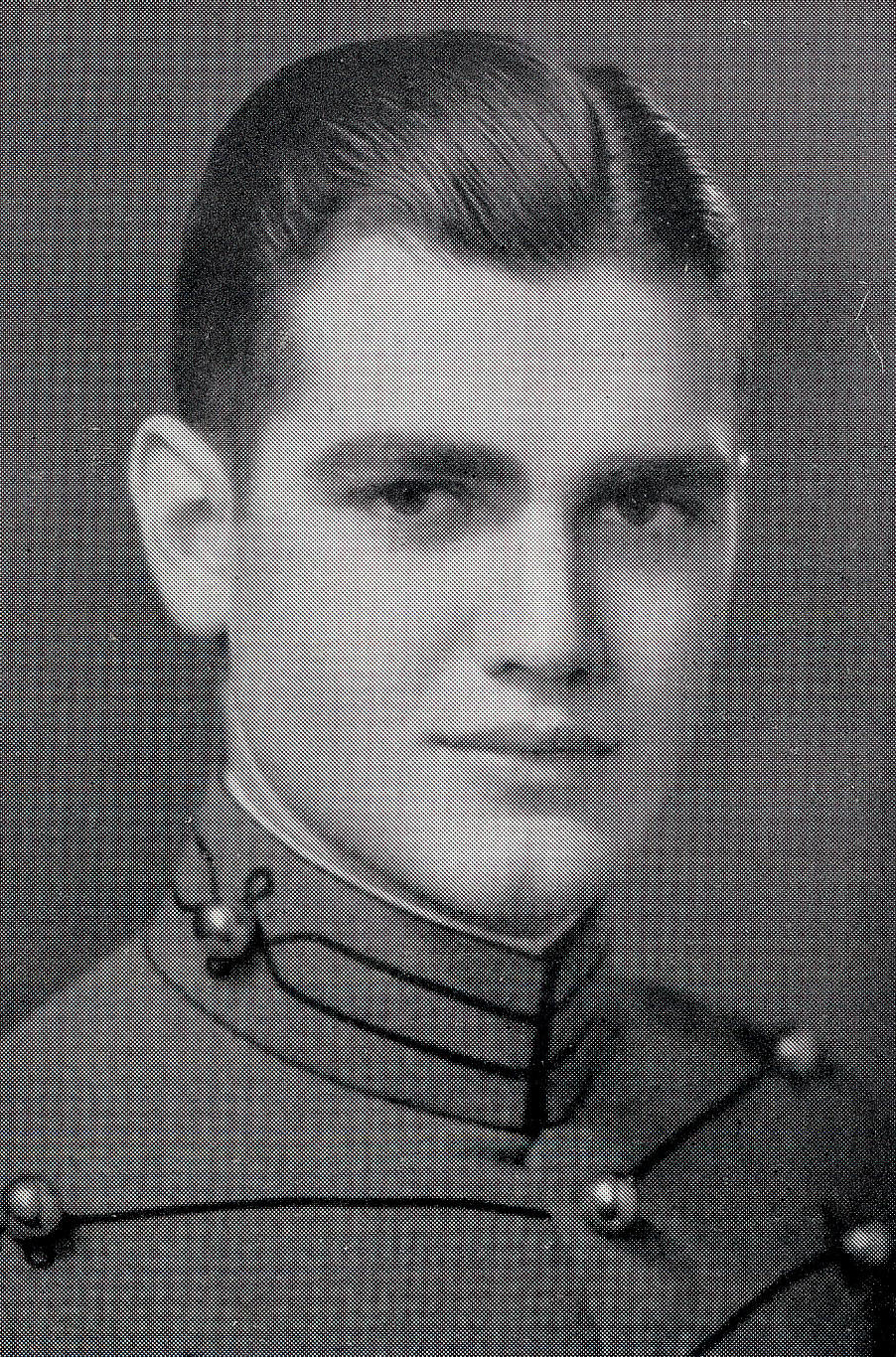
Westmoreland as a West Point cadet c. 1936

Westmoreland was born in Spartanburg, South Carolina, on 26 March 1914 to Eugenia Talley Childs and James Ripley Westmoreland. His upper middle class family was involved in the local banking and textile industries. Eugenia's aunt, Bessie Springs Childs, lived with other influential family members in Columbia, South Carolina, owning property that would become the Visanska Starks House. The family operated Springs Industries (now Springs Global) railroads and utilities.

At the age of 15, Westmoreland became an Eagle Scout in his Boy Scouts of America (BSA) local council's Troop 1, and was recipient of the Distinguished Eagle Scout Award and Silver Buffalo from the BSA as a young adult. After spending a year at The Citadel in 1932, he was appointed to attend the United States Military Academy on the nomination of Senator James F. Byrnes, a family friend.

Westmoreland said his motive for entering West Point was "to see the world". He was a member of a distinguished West Point class that also included Creighton Abrams and Benjamin O. Davis Jr. Westmoreland graduated as First Captain, the highest cadet rank, and received the Pershing Sword, which is "presented to the cadet with highest level of military proficiency". Westmoreland also served as the superintendent of the Protestant Sunday School Teachers.

== Military career ==
Brigadier General Westmoreland in paratrooper training in Korea, September 22, 1953

Following graduation from the United States Military Academy at West Point in 1936, Westmoreland became an artillery officer and served in several assignments with the 18th Field Artillery at Fort Sill. In 1939, he was promoted to first lieutenant, after which he was a battery commander and battalion staff officer with the 8th Field Artillery at Schofield Barracks, Hawaii. In World War II, Westmoreland saw combat with the 34th Field Artillery Regiment, 9th Infantry Division, in Tunisia, Sicily, France, and Germany; he commanded the 34th Battalion in Tunisia and Sicily. He reached the temporary wartime rank of colonel, and on 13 October 1944, was appointed the chief of staff of the 9th Infantry Division.

After the war, Westmoreland completed paratrooper training at the army's jump school in 1946. He then commanded the 504th Parachute Infantry Regiment, 82nd Airborne Division. From 1947 to 1950, he served as chief of staff for the 82nd Airborne Division. He was an instructor at the Command and General Staff College from August to October 1950 and at the newly organized U.S. Army War College from October 1950 to July 1952. From July 1952 to October 1953, Westmoreland commanded the 187th Airborne Regimental Combat Team in Japan and Korea. He was promoted to brigadier general in November 1952 at the age of 38, making him one of the youngest U.S. Army generals in the post-World War II era.

After returning to the United States in October 1953, Westmoreland was deputy assistant chief of staff, G–1, for manpower control on the army staff until 1955. In 1954, Westmoreland completed a three-month management program at Harvard Business School. As historian Stanley Karnow noted, "Westy was a corporation executive in uniform." From 1955 to 1958, he was the United States Army's Secretary of the General Staff. He then commanded the 101st Airborne Division from 1958 to 1960. He was Superintendent of the United States Military Academy from 1960 to 1963. In 1962, Westmoreland was admitted as an honorary member of the Massachusetts Society of the Cincinnati. He was promoted to lieutenant general in July 1963 and was Commanding General of the XVIII Airborne Corps from 1963 to 1964.

=== Vietnam War: Background and overview ===
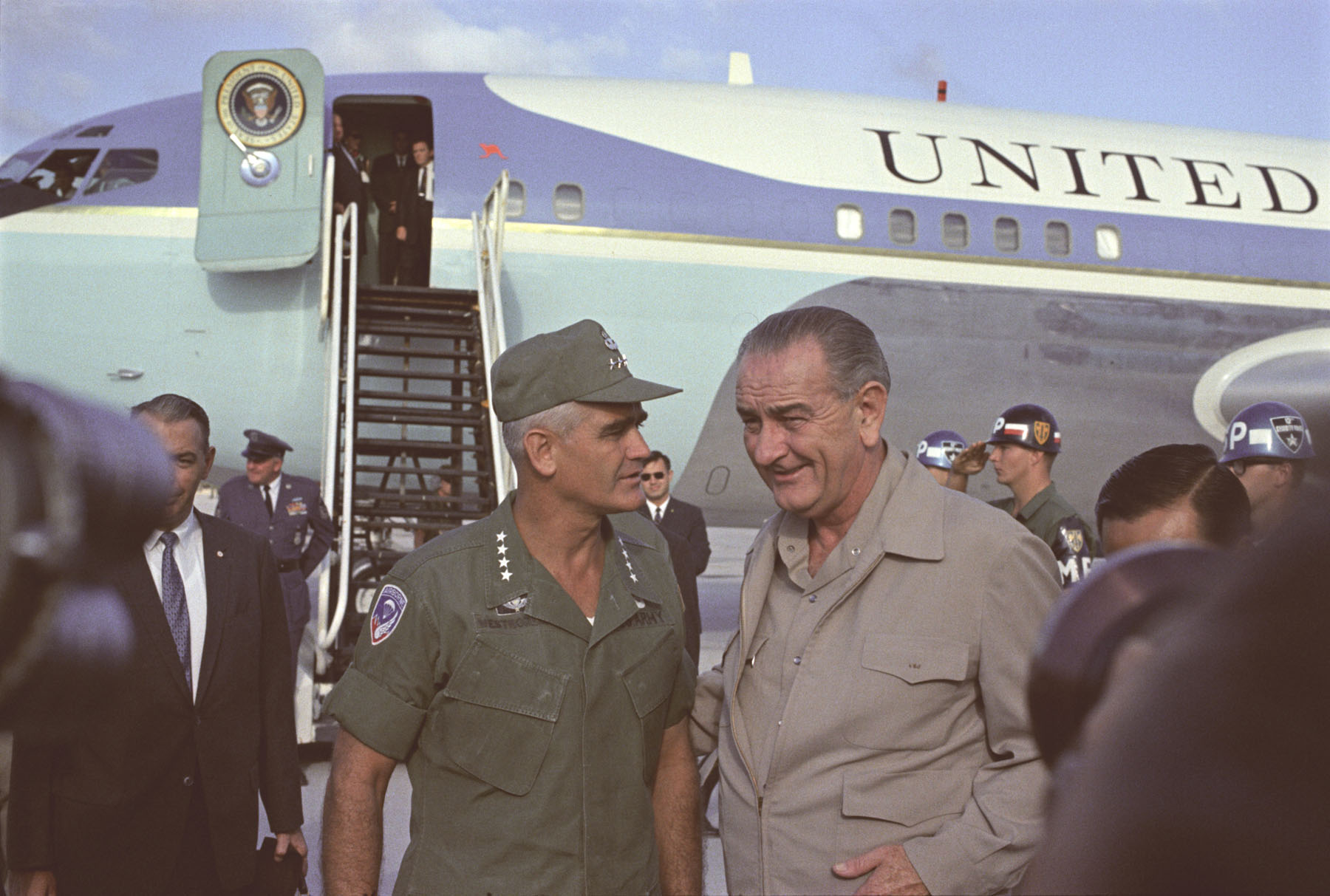
Westmoreland and President Lyndon B. Johnson at Cam Ranh Air Base in Khánh Hòa province, 23 December 1967

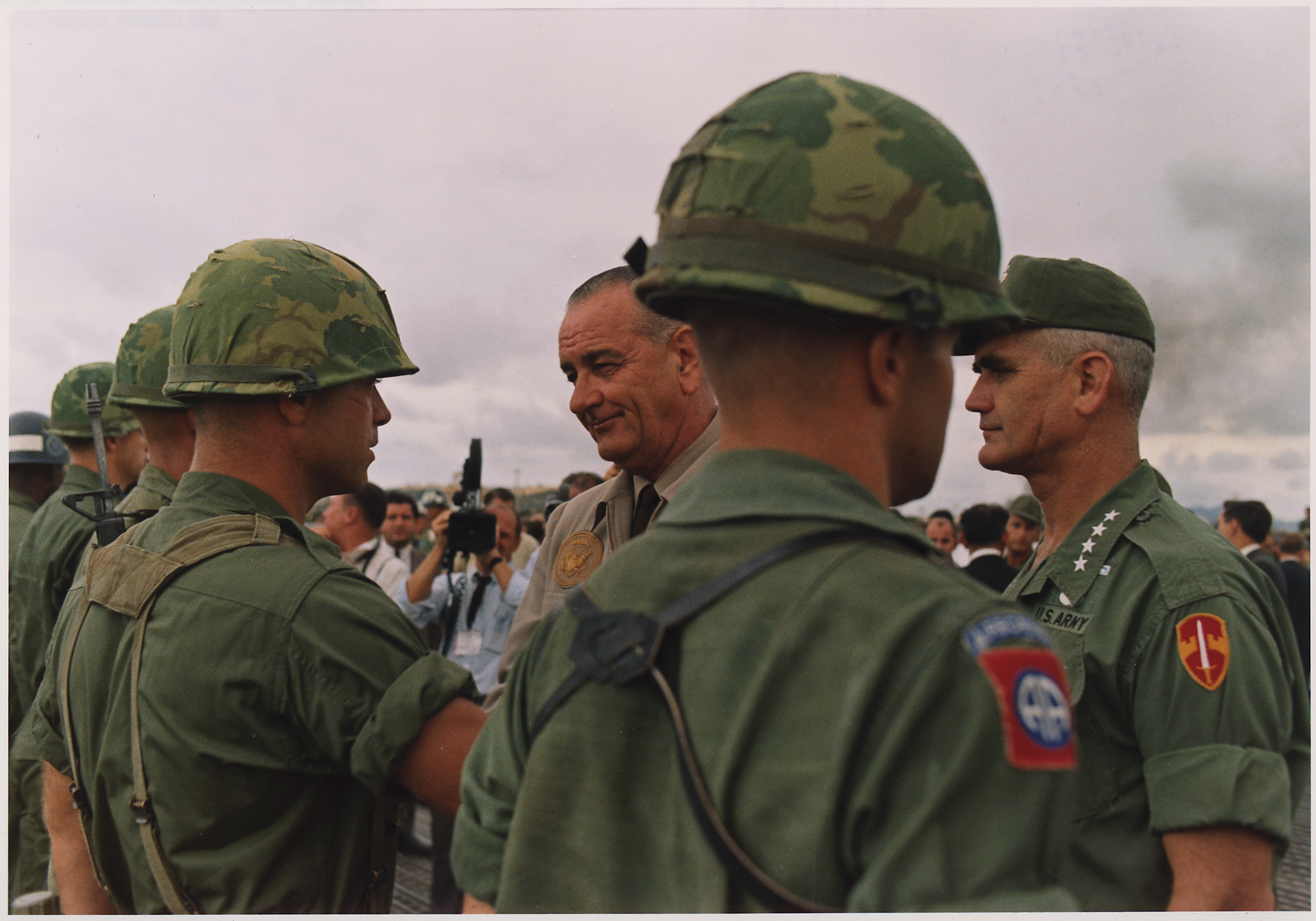
Johnson and Westmoreland decorating a soldier at Cam Ranh Bay, South Vietnam, in October 1966

The attempted French re-colonization of Vietnam following World War II culminated in a decisive French defeat at the Battle of Dien Bien Phu. The Geneva Conference (26 April – 20 July 1954) discussed the possibility of restoring peace in Indochina, and temporarily separated Vietnam into two zones, a northern zone to be governed by the Việt Minh, and a southern zone to be governed by the State of Vietnam, then headed by former emperor Bảo Đại. A Conference Final Declaration, issued by the British chairman of the conference, provided that a general election be held by July 1956 to create a unified Vietnamese state. Although presented as a consensus view, this document was not accepted by the delegates of either the State of Vietnam or the United States.

In addition, China, the Soviet Union, and other communist nations recognized North Vietnam while the United States and other non-communist states recognized South Vietnam as the legitimate government. In the 1950s the United States had endorsed the view of the Republic of Vietnam that Vietnam should be one nation, but by the time Westmoreland became army commander in South Vietnam, the United States had shifted to a view that Vietnam should like Korea remain separated between an anti-communist south and a communist north, separated by a demilitarized zone. To achieve this the United States was willing to greatly increase the resources it was devoting to Vietnam, but not to make the still larger increase that would have been required by an invasion of the north. The infiltration by regular North Vietnamese Army forces into the south could not be dealt with by an invasion of the north because intervention by China was something the U.S. government wanted to avoid, but President Lyndon B. Johnson had given commitments to uphold South Vietnam against communist North Vietnam.

General Harold Keith Johnson, Army Chief of Staff, came to see U.S. goals as having become mutually inconsistent, because defeating the communists would require declaring a national emergency and fully mobilizing the resources of the U.S. General Johnson was critical of Westmoreland's defused corporate style, considering him overattentive to what government officials wanted to hear. Nonetheless, Westmoreland was operating within longstanding army protocols of subordinating the military to civilian policymakers. The most important constraint was staying on the strategic defensive out of fear of Chinese intervention, but at the same time Johnson had made it clear that there was a higher commitment to defending Vietnam. Much of the thinking about defense was by academics-turned-government advisors who concentrated on nuclear weapons, seen as making conventional war obsolete. The fashion for counter-insurgency thinking also denigrated the role of conventional warfare. Despite the inconclusive outcome of the Korean War, Americans expected the war to end with an unconditional surrender of the enemy.

A dramatic increase in direct American participation in the Vietnam War began in February and March 1965, with 184,300 military personnel in Vietnam by the end of the year. Viet Cong and PAVN strategy, organization and structure meant that Westmoreland faced a dual threat. Regular North Vietnamese army units infiltrating across the remote border were apparently concentrating to mount an offensive and Westmoreland considered this the danger that had to be tackled immediately. There was also entrenched guerrilla subversion throughout the heavily populated coastal regions by the Viet Cong (VC). During this time, Westmoreland forbade the CIA from publishing a count of enemy fighters greater than 399,000, because admitting there were more than 600,000 fighters including guerrillas would have revealed that the insurgency had popular support. Consistent with the enthusiasm of Defense Secretary Robert McNamara for statistics, Westmoreland placed emphasis on body count and cited the Battle of Ia Drang as evidence the communists were losing.

The government sought to win at low cost, and policymakers received McNamara's interpretation indicating huge American casualties in prospect, prompting a reassessment of what could be achieved. The Battle of Ia Drang was unusual in that U.S. troops brought a large enemy formation to battle. After talking to junior officers General Westmoreland became skeptical about localized concentrated search and destroy sweeps of short duration, because the communist forces controlled whether there were military engagements, giving an option to simply avoid battle with U.S. forces if the situation warranted it. The alternative of sustained countrywide pacification operations, which would require massive use of U.S. manpower, was never available to Westmoreland, because it was considered politically unacceptable.

In public, Westmoreland continued to be sanguine about the progress being made throughout his time in Vietnam, though supportive journalist James Reston thought Westmoreland's characterizing of the conflict as attrition warfare presented his generalship in a misleading light. Westmoreland's critics say his successor, General Creighton Abrams, deliberately switched emphasis away from what Westmoreland dubbed attrition. Revisionists point to Abrams's first big operation being a tactical success that disrupted North Vietnamese buildup, but resulted in the Battle of Hamburger Hill, a political disaster that effectively curtailed Abrams's freedom to continue with such operations.

== Commander of Military Assistance Command, Vietnam (MACV) ==
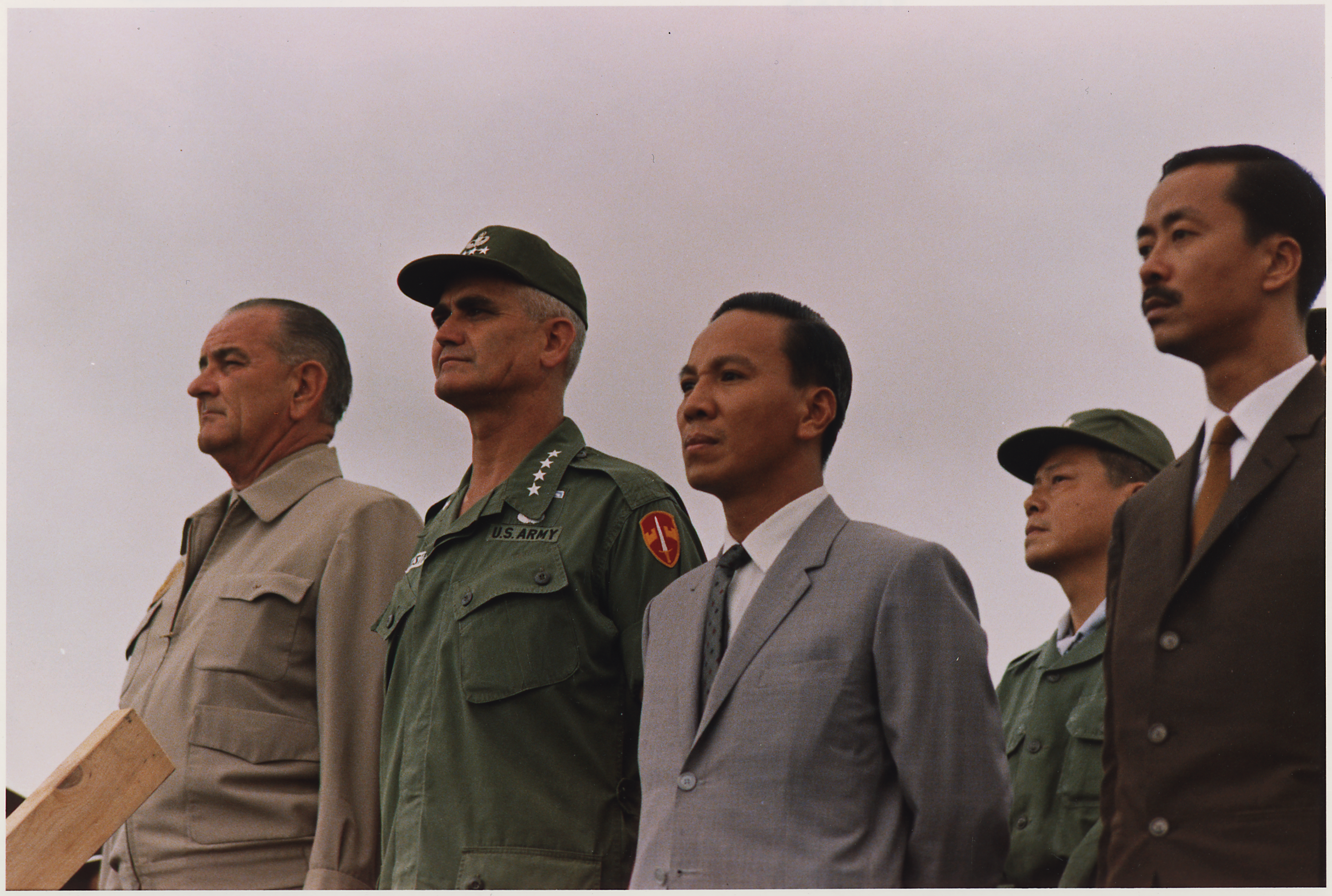
Left to right: President Johnson, Westmoreland, South Vietnamese President Nguyễn Văn Thiệu, and Prime Minister Nguyễn Cao Kỳ in October 1966

Westmoreland with President Lyndon B. Johnson in the Oval Office in November 1967

Westmoreland was sent to South Vietnam on 27 January 1964, as deputy commander of MACV. He succeeded Paul D. Harkins as acting commander on 20 June and as permanent commander on 1 August. Secretary of Defense McNamara told President Johnson in April that Westmoreland was "the best we have, without question". As the head of the MACV, he was known for highly publicized, positive assessments of US military prospects in South Vietnam. In 1965, Time named him man of the year. He was mentioned in another Time magazine article as a potential candidate for the 1968 Republican presidential nomination.

As time went on, the strengthening of communist combat forces in the south led to regular requests for increases in U.S. troop strength, from 16,000 when Westmoreland arrived to 535,000 in 1968 when he was promoted to Chief of Staff of the U.S. Army. On 28 April 1967, Westmoreland addressed a joint session of Congress. "In evaluating the enemy strategy", he said, "it is evident to me that he believes our Achilles heel is our resolve. ... Your continued strong support is vital to the success of our mission. ... Backed at home by resolve, confidence, patience, determination, and continued support, we will prevail in Vietnam over the communist aggressor!" Westmoreland claimed that under his leadership, United States forces "won every battle".

The turning point of the war was the 1968 Tet Offensive, in which communist forces attacked cities and towns throughout South Vietnam. At the time, Westmoreland was focused on the Battle of Khe Sanh and considered the Tet Offensive to be a diversionary attack. It is not clear if Khe Sanh was meant to be distraction for the Tet Offensive or vice versa; sometimes this is called the Riddle of Khe Sanh. Regardless, U.S. and South Vietnamese troops successfully fought off the attacks during the Tet Offensive, and the communist forces took heavy losses, but the ferocity of the assault shook public confidence in Westmoreland's previous assurances about the state of the war.

Political debate and public opinion led the Johnson administration to limit further increases in U.S. troop numbers in Vietnam. Nine months afterward, when the My Lai Massacre reports started to break, Westmoreland resisted pressure from the incoming Nixon administration for a cover-up, and pressed for a full and impartial investigation by Lieutenant General William R. Peers. However, a few days after the tragedy, he had praised the same involved unit on the "outstanding job", for the "U.S. infantrymen had killed 128 Communists [sic] in a bloody day-long battle". Post 1969 Westmoreland also made efforts to investigate the Phong Nhị and Phong Nhất massacre a year after the event occurred.

External videos
- Westmoreland: The General Who Lost Vietnam, at the U.S. Army War College in Carlisle, Pennsylvania, on November 3, 2011

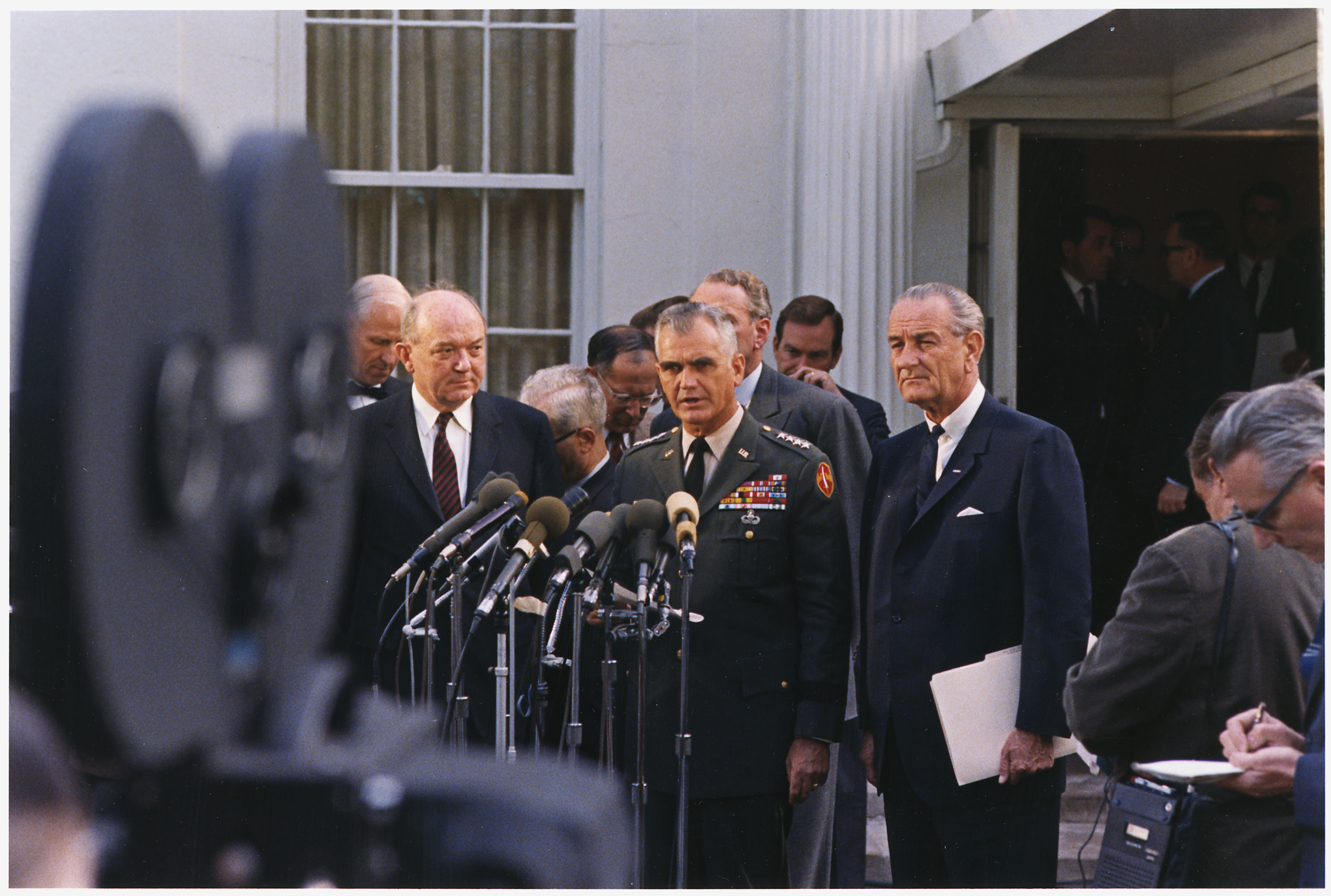
Westmoreland at a press conference outside the White House in April 1968

Westmoreland was convinced that the Vietnamese communists could be destroyed by fighting a war of attrition that, theoretically, would render the People's Army of Vietnam (PAVN) unable to fight. His war strategy was marked by heavy use of artillery and airpower and repeated attempts to engage the communists in large-unit battles, and thereby exploit the US's vastly superior firepower and technology. Westmoreland's response, to those Americans who criticized the high casualty rate of Vietnamese civilians, was: "It does deprive the enemy of the population, doesn't it?" However, the PAVN/VC were able to dictate the pace of attrition to fit their own goals: by continuing to fight a guerrilla war and avoiding large-unit battles, they denied the Americans the chance to fight the kind of war they were best at, and they ensured that attrition would wear down the American public's support for the war faster than they.

Westmoreland repeatedly rebuffed or suppressed attempts by John Paul Vann and Lew Walt to shift to a "pacification" strategy. Westmoreland had little appreciation of the patience of the American public for his time frame, and was struggling to persuade President Johnson to approve widening the war into Cambodia and Laos in order to interdict the Ho Chi Minh trail. He was unable to use the absolutist stance that "we can't win unless we expand the war". Instead, he focused on "positive indicators", which ultimately turned worthless when the Tet Offensive occurred, since all his pronouncements of "positive indicators" did not hint at the possibility of such a dramatic event. Tet outmaneuvered all of Westmoreland's pronouncements on "positive indicators" in the minds of the American public.

At one point in 1968, Westmoreland considered the use of nuclear weapons in Vietnam in a contingency plan codenamed Fracture Jaw, which was abandoned when it became known to the White House.

== Chief of Staff of the United States Army ==
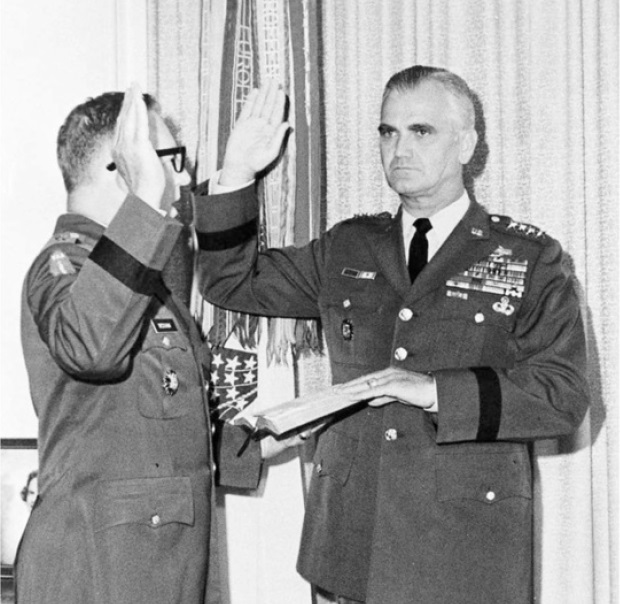
Westmoreland being sworn in as Chief of Staff of the Army by Vice Chief of Staff of the Army General Ralph E. Haines Jr. at the Pentagon on 3 July 1968

In June 1968, Westmoreland was appointed by President Johnson to succeed General Harold K. Johnson as Chief of Staff of the United States Army. Shortly after the Tet Offensive, it was announced that General Creighton Abrams would succeed Westmoreland as commander of the MACV.

Westmoreland served as Chief of Staff from 1968 to 1972. In 1970, in response to the My Lai Massacre by U.S. Army forces and the subsequent cover-up by the army chain of command, he commissioned an investigation that compiled a comprehensive and seminal study of leadership within the army during the Vietnam War demonstrating a severe erosion of adherence to the army's officer code of "Duty, Honor, Country". The report, entitled Study on Military Professionalism, had a profound influence on army policies, beginning with Westmoreland's decision to end the policy that officers serving in Vietnam would be rotated into a different post after only six months. However, to lessen the impact of this damaging report, Westmoreland ordered that the document be kept on "close hold" across the entire army for a period of two years and not disseminated to War College attendees. The report became known to the public only after Westmoreland retired in 1972.

On September 21, 1970, Westmoreland became a rated Army Aviator, having successfully completed Army Aviation training at Ft. Campbell, Ft. Rucker, and Washington, D.C.

Westmoreland tried to make army life more attractive during the transition to the all-volunteer force by eliminating reveille formations at dawn, allowing beer to be served in mess halls during evening meals, omitting bed check, easing pass policies, and other directives.

Westmoreland's tenure as Chief of Staff ended on 30 June 1972. He was offered the position of Supreme Allied Commander in Europe, but opted to retire on 30 June 1972. He was awarded the Army Distinguished Service Medal by President Richard Nixon.

== Later years ==
Westmoreland ran unsuccessfully for Governor of South Carolina as a Republican in the 1974 election. He published his autobiography the following year. Westmoreland later served on a task force to improve educational standards in the state of South Carolina.

In 1983, Westmoreland became a member of the Sons of the American Revolution after documenting his descent from Capt. William Hasell Gibbs, who served in the South Carolina artillery during the American Revolution. In 1996, the SAR established the General William C. Westmoreland Award in his honor. It is the Society’s highest national award for service to veterans and is presented to only one SAR member annually at the National Congress.

In 1986, Westmoreland served as grand marshal of the Chicago Vietnam Veterans parade. The parade, attended by 200,000 Vietnam veterans and more than half a million spectators, did much to repair the rift between Vietnam veterans and the American public.

== Westmoreland versus CBS: The Uncounted Enemy ==
Mike Wallace interviewed Westmoreland for the CBS special The Uncounted Enemy: A Vietnam Deception. The documentary, shown on 23 January 1982, and prepared largely by CBS producer George Crile III, alleged that Westmoreland and others had deliberately understated VC troop strength during 1967 in order to maintain U.S. troop morale and domestic support for the war. Westmoreland filed a lawsuit against CBS.

In Westmoreland v. CBS, Westmoreland sued Wallace and CBS for libel, and a lengthy legal process began. Just days before the lawsuit was to go to the jury, Westmoreland settled with CBS, and they issued a joint statement of understanding. Some contend that Judge Leval's instructions to the jury over what constituted "actual malice" to prove libel convinced Westmoreland's lawyers that he was certain to lose. Others point out that the settlement occurred after two of Westmoreland's former intelligence officers, Major General Joseph A. McChristian and Colonel Gains Hawkins, testified to the accuracy of the substantive allegations of the broadcast, which were that Westmoreland ordered changes in intelligence reports on Viet Cong troop strengths for political reasons. Disagreements persist about the appropriateness of some of the methods of CBS's editors.

A deposition by McChristian indicates that his organization developed improved intelligence on the number of irregular Viet Cong combatants shortly before he left Vietnam on a regularly scheduled rotation. The numbers troubled Westmoreland, who feared that the press would not understand them. He did not order them changed, but instead did not include the information in reporting to Washington, which in his view was not appropriate to report.

Based on later analysis of the information from all sides, it appears clear that Westmoreland could not sustain a libel suit because CBS's principal allegation was that he had caused intelligence officers to suppress facts. Westmoreland's anger was caused by the implication of the broadcast that his intent was fraudulent and that he ordered others to lie. The reality was complicated. Westmoreland had made it clear to his subordinates that he preferred low estimates of enemy strength. His chief of intelligence, Brigadier General Phillip Davidson, responded by ordering his subordinates to produce low estimates, but said he believed those low estimates would in fact be valid. The officers who acknowledged openly that the low estimates they produced were lies were at the rank of colonel and below.

During the acrimonious trial, Mike Wallace was hospitalized for depression, and despite the legal conflict separating the two, Westmoreland and his wife sent him flowers. Wallace's memoir is generally sympathetic to Westmoreland, although he makes it clear he disagreed with him on issues surrounding the Vietnam War and the Nixon administration's policies in Southeast Asia.

== Views on the Vietnam War ==
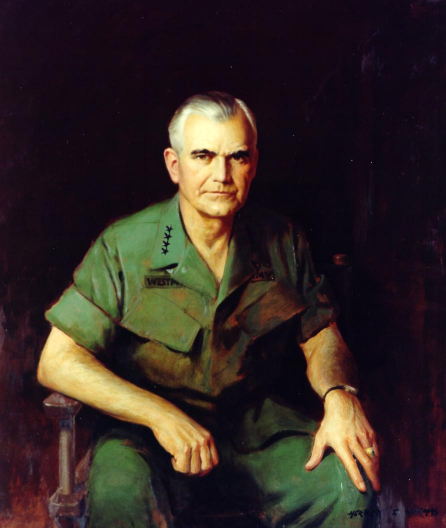
A 1972 portrait of Westmoreland by Herbert Abrams

In a 1998 interview for George magazine, Westmoreland criticized the battlefield prowess of his direct opponent, North Vietnamese general Võ Nguyên Giáp. "Of course, he [Giáp] was a formidable adversary", Westmoreland told correspondent W. Thomas Smith Jr. "Let me also say that Giap was trained in small-unit, guerrilla tactics, but he persisted in waging a big-unit war with terrible losses to his own men. By his own admission, by early 1969, I think, he had lost, what, a half million soldiers? He reported this. Now such a disregard for human life may make a formidable adversary, but it does not make a military genius. An American commander losing men like that would hardly have lasted more than a few weeks." In the 1974 film Hearts and Minds, Westmoreland opined that "The Oriental doesn't put the same high price on life as does a Westerner. Life is plentiful, life is cheap in the Orient. And as the philosophy of the Orient expresses it: Life is not important."

Westmoreland's view has been criticized by Nick Turse, the author of the book Kill Anything That Moves: The Real American War in Vietnam. Turse said that many of the Vietnamese killed were actually innocent civilians, and that many of these casualties were not caused by military cross-fire but were a direct result of the U.S. policy and tactics. He accused the U.S. of employing a policy of "kill everything that moves" which enabled the US soldiers to shoot civilians for "suspicious behavior". He stated that, after having "spoken to survivors of massacres by United States forces at Phi Phu, Trieu Ai, My Luoc and so many other hamlets" that he could say "with certainty that Westmoreland's assessment was false". He also accused Westmoreland of concealing evidence of atrocities from the American public when he was the Army Chief of Staff.

In more than a decade of analyzing long-classified military criminal investigation files, court-martial transcripts, Congressional studies, contemporaneous journalism and the testimony of United States soldiers and Vietnamese civilians, I found that Gen. William C. Westmoreland, his subordinates, superiors and successors also engaged in a profligate disregard for human life.

— Nick Turse

Historian Derek Frisby also criticized Westmoreland's view during an interview with Deutsche Welle:

General William Westmoreland, who commanded U.S. military operations in the Vietnam War, unhesitatingly believed Giap was a butcher for relentlessly sacrificing his soldiers in unwinnable battles. Yet, that assessment in itself is key to understanding the West's failure to defeat him. Giap understood that protracted warfare would cost many lives but that did not always translate into winning or losing the war. In the final analysis, Giap won the war despite losing many battles, and as long as the army survived to fight another day, the idea of Vietnam lived in the hearts of the people who would support it, and that is the essence of "revolutionary war".

— Derek Frisby

For the remainder of his life, Westmoreland maintained that the United States did not lose the war in Vietnam; he stated instead that "our country did not fulfill its commitment to South Vietnam. By virtue of Vietnam, the U.S. held the line for 10 years and stopped the dominoes from falling."

== Personal life ==
Westmoreland first met his future wife, Katherine (Kitsy) Stevens Van Deusen (1927-2021), while stationed at Fort Sill. Westmoreland met her again in North Carolina when she was nineteen and a student at University of North Carolina at Greensboro. The couple married in May 1947 and had three children.

Just hours after Westmoreland was sworn in as Army Chief of Staff on July 7, 1968, his brother-in-law, Lieutenant Colonel Frederick Van Deusen, commander of 2nd Battalion, 47th Infantry Regiment, was killed when his helicopter was shot down in the Mekong Delta region of Vietnam.

== Death ==
Westmoreland died on 18 July 2005, at the age of 91 at the Bishop Gadsden retirement home in Charleston, South Carolina. He had suffered from Alzheimer's disease during the final years of his life. He was buried on 23 July 2005, at the West Point Cemetery.

== Legacy ==
- In 1970, Westmoreland was inducted as a Laureate of The Lincoln Academy of Illinois and awarded the Order of Lincoln (the state's highest honor) by Illinois governor Richard B. Ogilvie in the area of Government.
- In 1992, the General William C. Westmoreland Bridge in Charleston, South Carolina, was named in his honor.
- In 1996, the National Society of the Sons of the American Revolution (SAR) authorized the General William C. Westmoreland Award. The award is given each year in recognition to an outstanding SAR veterans volunteer.

== Major military assignments ==
- Commander, 34th Field Artillery Battalion, 9th Infantry Division; 1943–1944
- Chief of Staff, 9th Infantry Division; 13 October 1944 to 1946
- Commander, 504th Parachute Infantry Regiment, 82d Airborne Division; 1946 to 1947
- Chief of Staff, 82d Airborne Division; 1947 to 1950
- Instructor, Army Command and General Staff College; 1950 to 1951
- Student, Army War College; 1951
- Instructor, Army War College; 1951 to November 1952
- 187th Airborne Regimental Combat Team; November 1952 to 1953
- Deputy Assistant Chief of Staff, G–1, for Manpower; 1953 to 1955
- Secretary of the General Staff; 1955 to 1958
- Commanding General, 101st Airborne Division; 1958 to 1960
- Superintendent, United States Military Academy; 1 July 1960 to 27 June 1963
- Commanding General, XVIIIth Airborne Corps; July 1963 to December 1963
- Deputy Commander, United States Military Assistance Command Vietnam; January 1964 to June 1964
- Commander, United States Military Assistance Command Vietnam; June 1964 to June 1968
- Chief of Staff, United States Army; 3 July 1968 to 30 June 1972

== Military awards ==
Westmoreland's military awards include:

Combat Infantryman Badge
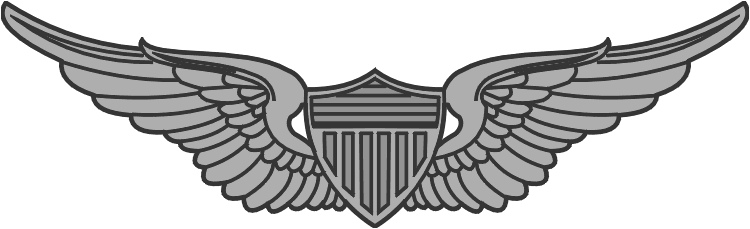
Basic Army Aviator Badge
Master Parachutist Badge
Army Staff Identification Badge
16 Overseas Service Bars

Army Distinguished Service Medal with three bronze oak leaf clusters
Legion of Merit with two Oak Leaf Clusters
Bronze Star Medal
Air Medal with nine Oak Leaf Clusters
Army Presidential Unit Citation
American Defense Service Medal with one bronze service star
American Campaign Medal
European–African–Middle Eastern Campaign Medal with seven service stars
World War II Victory Medal
Army of Occupation Medal with "Germany" clasp
National Defense Service Medal with oak leaf cluster
Korean Service Medal with two 3/16" bronze stars
Vietnam Service Medal with six 3/16" bronze stars

Foreign decorations and awards

Knight Grand Cross of the Order of the Holy Trinity (post-nominal: GCHT) (Ethiopia)
Legion of Honour, Knight (France)
Croix de Guerre with bronze palm (France)
Order of Military Merit, Taegeuk Medal (Republic of Korea)
Order of National Security Merit, Tong-Il Medal with Gold Star (Republic of Korea)
National Order of Vietnam, Knight Grand Cross (Republic of Vietnam)
Republic of Vietnam Distinguished Service Order, First Class (Army)
Republic of Vietnam Distinguished Service Order, First Class (Air Force)
Republic of Vietnam Distinguished Service Order, First Class (Navy)
Republic of Vietnam Gallantry Cross with Palm
Republic of Vietnam Armed Forces Honor Medal, First Class
Republic of Vietnam Civil Actions Medal, First Class
Republic of Vietnam Chuong My Medal, First Class
Order of Sikatuna, rank of Lakan (Commander) (Philippines)
Most Exalted Order of the White Elephant, Knight Grand Cross (First Class) (Thailand)
Order of Military Merit, Grand Officer (Brazil)
Condecoracion al Mérito Militar "Prócer de la Libertad General de División José Miguel Lanza", Grand Officer (Bolivia)
Order of the Rising Sun, class unknown (Japan)
Order of the Cloud and Banner, Grand Cordon (Republic of China)
Republic of Korea Presidential Unit Citation
Vietnam Gallantry Cross Unit Citation
Vietnam Civil Actions Medal Unit Citation
United Nations Korea Medal
Vietnam Campaign Medal

== Other awards ==
Knox Trophy Award, USMA highest military efficiency as a cadet at West Point, 1936.

== Dates of rank ==
United States Military Academy class of 1936

Second Lieutenant (Regular Army)	First Lieutenant (Regular Army)	Major (Army of the United States)	Lieutenant Colonel (Army of the United States)	Colonel (Army of the United States)
O-1	O-2	O-4	O-5	O-6
12 June 1936	12 June 1939	1 February 1942 (temporary)	25 September 1942 (temporary)	28 July 1944 (temporary)

Captain (Regular Army)	Major (Regular Army)	Brigadier General (Army of the United States)	Lieutenant Colonel (Regular Army)	Major General (Army of the United States)
O-3	O-4	O-7	O-5	O-8
12 June 1946	15 July 1948	7 November 1952 (temporary)	7 July 1953	December 1956 (temporary)

Colonel (Regular Army)	Brigadier General (Regular Army)	Major General (Regular Army)	Lieutenant General (Army of the United States)	General (Army of the United States)
O-6	O-7	O-8	O-9	O-10
June 1961	14 July 1962	20 May 1963	31 July 1963 (temporary)	1 August 1964 (temporary)

Retired from active service in July 1972.

== Cited and general references ==
- Karnow, Stanley (1991), Vietnam: A History, New York: Penguin, ISBN 978-0140265477.
- Mascaro, Tom (1982), The Uncounted Enemy: A Vietnam Deception, Chicago: The Museum of Broadcast Communications.
- Smith, W. Thomas Jr. (November 1998), "An old soldier sounds off", George, New York.
- Wallace, Mike; Gates, Gary Paul (2005), Between You and Me, New York: Hyperion, ISBN 978-1401383565.
- Westmoreland, William C. (1976), A Soldier Reports, Garden City, New York: Doubleday, ISBN 978-0385004343.

Military offices
Preceded by Garrison Holt Davidson	Superintendent of the United States Military Academy; 1960–1963	Succeeded by James Benjamin Lampert
Preceded by Paul D. Harkins	Commander, Military Assistance Command, Vietnam; 1964–1968	Succeeded by Creighton Abrams
Preceded by Harold K. Johnson	Chief of Staff of the United States Army; 1968–1972	Succeeded by Bruce Palmer Jr. (acting)
Honorary titles
Preceded by Lyndon Johnson	Time's Man of the Year; 1965	Succeeded by The Generation Twenty-Five and Under
