= Richard Helms =

U.S. Director of Central Intelligence (1966–1973)

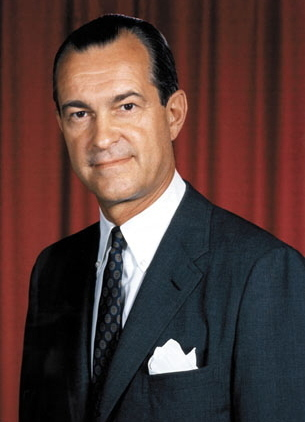
- Official portrait c. 1966–72

United States Ambassador to Iran
- In office April 5, 1973 – December 27, 1976
- President: Richard Nixon; Gerald Ford
- Preceded by: Joseph S. Farland
- Succeeded by: William H. Sullivan

8th Director of Central Intelligence
- In office June 30, 1966 – February 2, 1973
- President: Lyndon B. Johnson; Richard Nixon
- Deputy: Rufus Taylor; Robert E. Cushman Jr. Vernon A. Walters
- Preceded by: William Raborn
- Succeeded by: James R. Schlesinger

7th Deputy Director of Central Intelligence
- In office April 28, 1965 – June 30, 1966
- President: Lyndon B. Johnson
- Preceded by: Marshall Carter
- Succeeded by: Rufus Taylor

Deputy Director of Central Intelligence for Plans
- In office February 17, 1962 – April 28, 1965
- President: John F. Kennedy; Lyndon B. Johnson
- Preceded by: Richard M. Bissell Jr.
- Succeeded by: Desmond Fitzgerald

Personal details
- Born: Richard McGarrah Helms; March 30, 1913 St. Davids, Pennsylvania, U.S.
- Died: October 23, 2002 (aged 89) Washington, D.C., U.S.
- Resting place: Arlington National Cemetery
- Relations: Gates W. McGarrah (grandfather)
- Education: Williams College (BA)

Military service
- Allegiance: United States
- Branch/service: United States Navy
- Years of service: 1942–1946
- Battles/wars: World War II
- Criminal information
- Conviction: Misleading congress (1977)
- Penalty: Two years suspended sentence and $2,000 fine

Richard McGarrah Helms (March 30, 1913 – October 23, 2002) was an American government official, intelligence officer, and diplomat who served as Director of Central Intelligence (DCI) from 1966 to 1973 as well as United States Ambassador to Iran from 1973 to 1976.

Helms served in the Office of Strategic Services, a wartime predecessor to the CIA, in Europe during World War II. After the war, he returned to Washington, DC, to become one of the founding officers of the CIA.

Following the 1947 creation of the Central Intelligence Agency (CIA), Helms rose in its ranks during the presidencies of Truman, Eisenhower and Kennedy. Then, Helms was DCI under Presidents Johnson and Nixon, yielding to James R. Schlesinger in early 1973.

During his tenure as head of the CIA under presidents Lyndon B. Johnson and Richard Nixon, Helms oversaw the agency's involvement in the Vietnam War, Six Day War, and efforts to undermine Chilean president Salvador Allende. Domestically, he directed surveillance of American radicals in Operation CHAOS and was a key figure in the earliest stages of the Watergate scandal, delaying the investigation into the initial break-in and distancing the CIA from public involvement, but ultimately declining to use state secrets privilege to complete the cover-up.

He was forced to resign by Nixon in 1973 and appointed Ambassador to Iran, where he served from April 1973 to December 1976.

After leaving public office, Helms was subject to scrutiny for his tenure at the CIA during a period of growing distrust of American intelligence agencies. Helms was a key witness in the Church Committee investigation of the CIA during the mid-1970s, but the investigation was hampered severely by his own 1973 order to destroy all files related to the MKUltra program. In 1977, as a result of earlier covert operations in Chile, Helms became the only DCI convicted of misleading Congress.

== Early life and education ==
Richard McGarrah Helms was born on March 30, 1913 in St. Davids, Pennsylvania. His father, Herman Henry Helms, was the son of Lutheran immigrants from Sudwalde, Lower Saxony and a senior executive at Alcoa. His mother, Marion Helms (née McGarrah), was the daughter of Gates W. McGarrah, the first president of the Bank of International Settlements.

Helms received part of his education in Switzerland and Germany, which contributed to his fluency in German and French. He attended Institut Le Rosey, a private boarding school in Switzerland. He graduated from Williams College in Massachusetts. After graduating from Williams College, he worked as a journalist in Europe and for the Indianapolis Times.

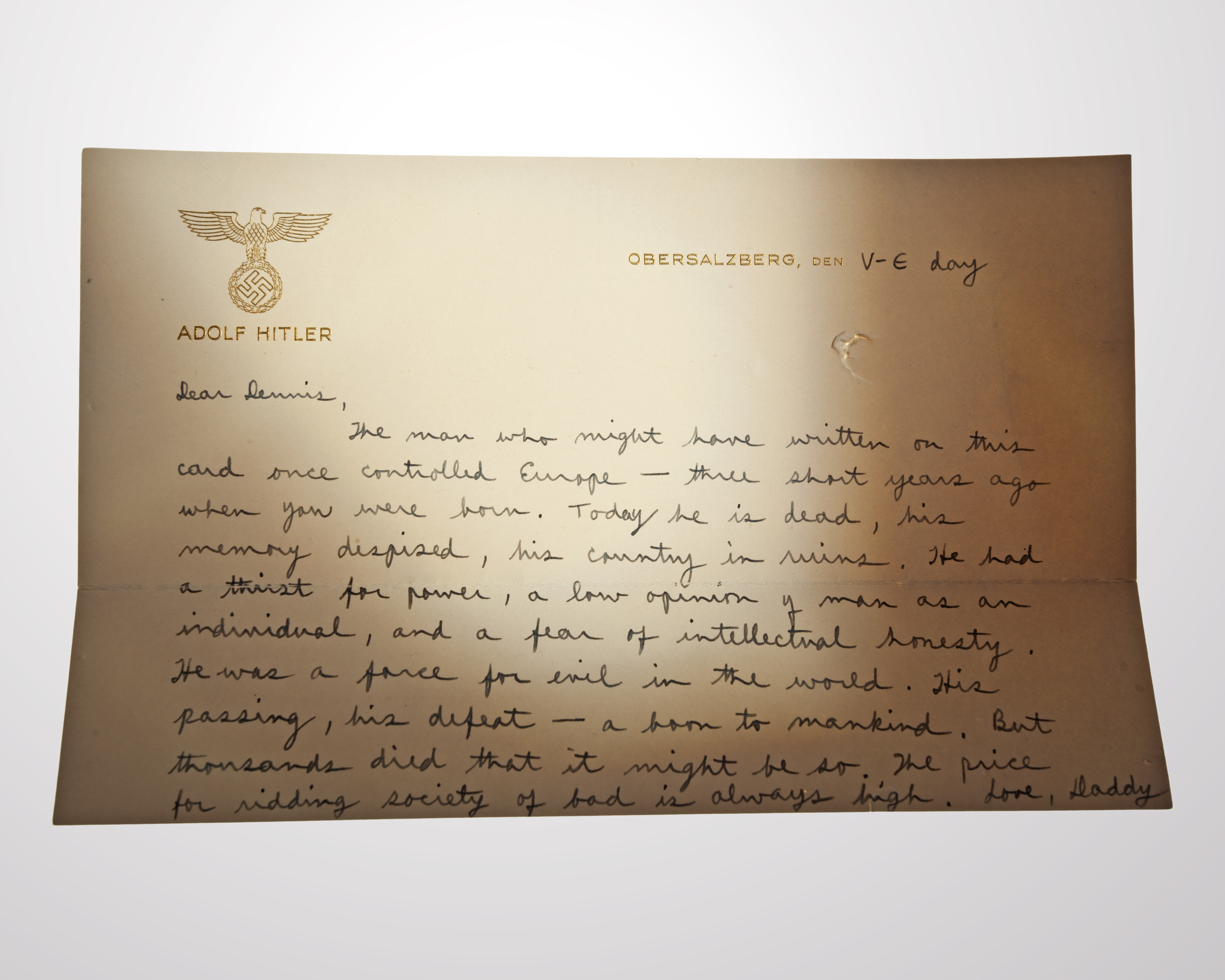
Helms wrote a letter to his son Dennis, celebrating V-E Day, on stationery which had belonged to Adolf Hitler.

== World War II ==
Upon the United States entry into World War II, Helms joined the Navy. He was recruited to the Office of Strategic Services (OSS), the wartime intelligence agency of the United States, and served in Europe. Following the war, he was stationed with the OSS in Germany.

While there, he wrote a letter to his son Dennis on stationery he had recovered from Adolf Hitler's office in the ruins of the Reich Chancellery. The letter was dated "V-E Day" (May 8, 1945), the day Germany surrendered. In 2011, Dennis Helms donated the letter to the private museum of CIA headquarters in Langley, Virginia.

In 1945, the OSS was terminated, and Helms joined the Strategic Services Unit, which had been established to take over the work of the Secret Intelligence and X-2 Counter Espionage branches of the OSS. Helms focused on espionage in central Europe at the start of the Cold War and took part in vetting the Gehlen Organization in Germany. When intelligence and counter-espionage was transferred to the Office of Special Operations (OSO), Helms followed.

== Early CIA career ==
=== Chief of Operations (1947–58) ===
In 1947, the Central Intelligence Agency (CIA) was founded, and OSO was transferred into the new organization. Helms was made head of OSO shortly before Director of Central Intelligence (DCI) Walter Bedell Smith merged OSO with the Office of Policy Coordination in 1952 to form the new Directorate of Plans. The Directorate was led by Frank Wisner as Deputy DCI for Plans (DDP) until 1958, with Helms serving as his Chief of Operations. During its early period, the CIA had a reputation for political liberalism stemming from its opposition to fascism during World War II.

In 1953, Allen Dulles was named DCI, and his brother John Foster Dulles was appointed United States Secretary of State. During this period, as Chief of Operations, Helms was specifically tasked with defending the CIA against threats from Senator Joseph McCarthy and the development of the controversial project MKUltra. He oversaw Operation Gold, a joint British-American effort to wiretap Soviet Army headquarters in Berlin using a tunnel into the Soviet occupation zone. The plan was revealed to the Soviets by a mole in MI6, George Blake, and the Soviets revealed their knowledge to the public in 1956, causing a media sensation.

Because the Soviets could not publicly reveal their foreknowledge without risking Blake's cover, the mission was celebrated as a success in the United States, where Allen Dulles claimed that it had revealed order of battle plans and other information about communist operations behind the Iron Curtain.

As Chief of Operations, Helms generally focused on espionage and information-gathering, emphasizing long-term strategy over high-risk covert operations. However, Dulles and Wisner directed such operations to influence regime change in Iran (1953), Guatemala (1954) and the Congo (1960), which Helms oversaw. In Iran, regime change brought Mohammad Reza Pahlavi, who had been Helms's classmate at Institut Le Rosey, to power.

In 1958, Wisner resigned from the CIA. Rather than elevating Helms, Dulles chose Richard M. Bissell Jr. as the new DDP. During the early presidency of John F. Kennedy, Dulles selected Helms to testify before Congress on the topic of Soviet forgery.

In 1961, the failed Bay of Pigs Invasion resulted in the resignation of Dulles as DCI. Although Helms, as chief of operations, was involved in the failed operation, he successfully distanced himself from its disastrous results. CIA official and author Victor Marchetti later noted that Helms had been meticulous to ensure "that not a single piece of paper existed in the agency which linked [him] to ... the Bay of Pigs."

=== Deputy Director for Plans (1962–65) and Deputy DCI (1965–66) ===
Following the 1961 Bay of Pigs fiasco and resignation of Dulles as DCI, John F. Kennedy appointed John McCone as DCI and Helms was promoted to DDP. As DDP, Helms was assigned to manage the CIA's role in Operation Mongoose, a multi-agency effort to depose Fidel Castro as the leader of Cuba. During the Cuban Missile Crisis, Helms supported McCone's contributions to the strategic White House discussions.

After the 1963 South Vietnamese coup d'état, Helms was privy to Kennedy's anguish over the killing of South Vietnamese president Ngo Dinh Diem. Three weeks later, Kennedy himself was assassinated. Helms worked to manage the CIA's complicated response during its subsequent investigation by the Warren Commission.

In 1965, Lyndon B. Johnson appointed William Raborn as DCI and Helms as Deputy Director of Central Intelligence. After less than one year, Raborn resigned, and Johnson elevated Helms to DCI.

==== Vietnam and Laos ====
Earlier American intelligence operations in Vietnam dated back to OSS contacts with the communist-led resistance to Japanese occupation during World War II. After French withdrawal in 1954, CIA officers including Edward Lansdale assisted Ngo Dinh Diem in his efforts to reconstitute an independent government in the south. Early CIA reports did not present an optimistic appraisal of Diem's future.

Many analysts concluded that a favorable outcome was more likely for the new communist regime in the north under its widely admired leader Ho Chi Minh. Nationwide elections were avoided, and the CIA continued to back Diem, though he refused to enact reforms recommended by the agency.

During the 1960s, the CIA became fully engaged in political and military affairs in Southeast Asia, including intelligence-gathering and both overt and covert field operations. For example, the CIA organized armed minority Hmong in Laos, rural counterinsurgency forces in Vietnam, and minority Montagnards in the highlands. The CIA was also actively involved in South Vietnamese internal politics, especially after the 1963 coup which killed Diem. Helms personally traveled to Vietnam with DCI McCone in 1962.

In 1963, Helms directed the CIA effort to defend the Kingdom of Laos against the communist revolutionary Pathet Lao, which were supported by North Vietnam. Because both the CIA and North Vietnamese were in violation of the 1962 International Agreement on the Neutrality of Laos, the efforts were conducted covertly. Several hundred CIA personnel were involved in managing a large scale paramilitary operation, largely in the form of training and arming native tribal groups, primarily the Hmong under Vang Pao.

The efforts, which continued through Helms's term as DCI, were largely successful at maintaining the functional neutrality of Laos despite the presence of the Ho Chi Minh trail, and Helms later repeatedly referred to Laos as "the war we won." Despite this, the "secret war" later drew frequent political attacks, and CIA critics cite the operation as the origin of CIA involvement in alleged heroin trafficking throughout the Golden Triangle.

Helms was later highly critical of U.S. senators who claimed to be unaware of the CIA operations in Laos, including Stuart Symington, who had visited CIA stations in Laos twice, been briefed on the progress of the operations, and praised their success.

== Director of Central Intelligence (1966–73) ==
Helms was appointed DCI by Lyndon B. Johnson in 1966. He was the first homegrown DCI, having risen through the ranks from the agency's founding, and he would continue in the role through the first term of President Richard Nixon, leaving office in 1973.

During his tenure as head of the CIA, Helms oversaw the agency's involvement in the Vietnam War and Southeast Asia, the Six Day War, subversive activities against the Salvador Allende presidency in Chile, and domestic surveillance of American radicals. After the Six-Day War, Helms became one of Lyndon Johnson's top advisors on matters of foreign policy, and increasingly pessimistic CIA assessments of the Vietnam War culminated in Johnson's decision not to seek re-election to the presidency, on advice from Helms and several foreign policy advisors relying on CIA intelligence.

While he was a trusted advisor to Johnson, Helms came into conflict with the Nixon administration, particularly National Security Advisor Henry Kissinger, over the agency's authority and strategy, as well as the Watergate scandal. Nixon eventually forced Helms to resign as DCI and he accepted a position as ambassador to Iran in April 1973.

=== Vietnam War ===
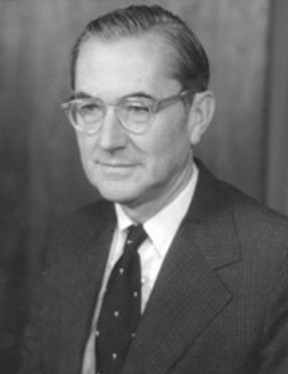
William Colby ran the Far East and Soviet desks at the CIA under Helms and administered the Phoenix Program under Helms.

==== Conflicts within CIA and with military intelligence ====
As the military and political situation progressed in Southeast Asia, CIA reports became more pessimistic regarding South Vietnamese prospects. By the time Helms took office as DCI, the CIA was sharply divided over the issue, with those active in the region, such as Lucien Conein and William Colby, remaining robustly optimistic regarding their projects.

According to historian Anne Karalekas, "At no time was the institutional dichotomy between the operational and analytic components more stark." In his 2003 memoirs, Helms described the divisions:

From the outset, the intelligence directorate and the Office of National Estimates held a pessimistic view of the military developments. The operations personnel ... remained convinced the war could be won. Without this conviction, the operators could not have continued their difficult face-to-face work with the South Vietnamese, whose lives were often at risk. In Washington, I felt like a circus rider standing astride two horses, each for the best of reasons going its own way.

In addition to internal conflict, the CIA had a statutory mandate to reconcile the conflicting views of various other American intelligence services, including the Defense Intelligence Agency and Bureau of Intelligence and Research. The Johnson administration was resistant to negative outlooks regarding Vietnam; this resistance had eventually led to McCone's exclusion from White House strategy meetings and contributed to McCone's decision to resign in 1965.

After Helms took office, Johnson increased the size and scope of American commitment to South Vietnam in 1965, CIA estimates became more optimistic. According to CIA officer Ray S. Cline, "the pressure to give the right answer came along. I felt increasing pressure to say the war was winnable." In the following years, Helms was regularly asked for intelligence reports on military action, which military leaders resented.

Over time, the American strategy relied on attrition warfare, and the CIA faced increasing pressure to conform to the military estimates of enemy casualties. Bitterness between the United States Army and the CIA became common knowledge within the administration.

Accounts of Helms's influence during the Johnson administration differ. According to historian John Ranelagh, Helms "used his influence with Lyndon Johnson to warn about the growing dangers of U.S. involvement in Vietnam." By contrast, Stansfield Turner, who served as DCI from 1977 to 1981, described Helms as overly loyal to the office of president and suggested that Helms moderated analysts' opinions before they reached President Johnson.

In 1967, one CIA analyst, Sam Adams, filed a formal complaint against Helms for deferring to the military's estimates of Viet Cong forces. A CIA review board considered the complaint, and the discrepancy later became significant to litigation between CBS News and William Westmoreland.

==== Phoenix Program ====
A major component of the South Vietnamese counterinsurgency policy was the establishment of strategic hamlets to contest communist operations in the countryside. In 1967 and 1968, the CIA launched the controversial Phoenix Program to support these efforts and eliminate the Viet Cong.

Under the program, Vietnamese intelligence, military, police, and civilian forces were deployed in the field against Viet Cong support networks. Although it was officially administered by Civil Operations and Revolutionary Development Support (CORDS), the CIA designed and led the program, and William Colby took a temporary leave of absence as head of the CIA Soviet Division to lead CORDS. Colby succeeded Robert Komer at CORDS, and an increasing number of CIA personnel became involved in the Phoenix Program.

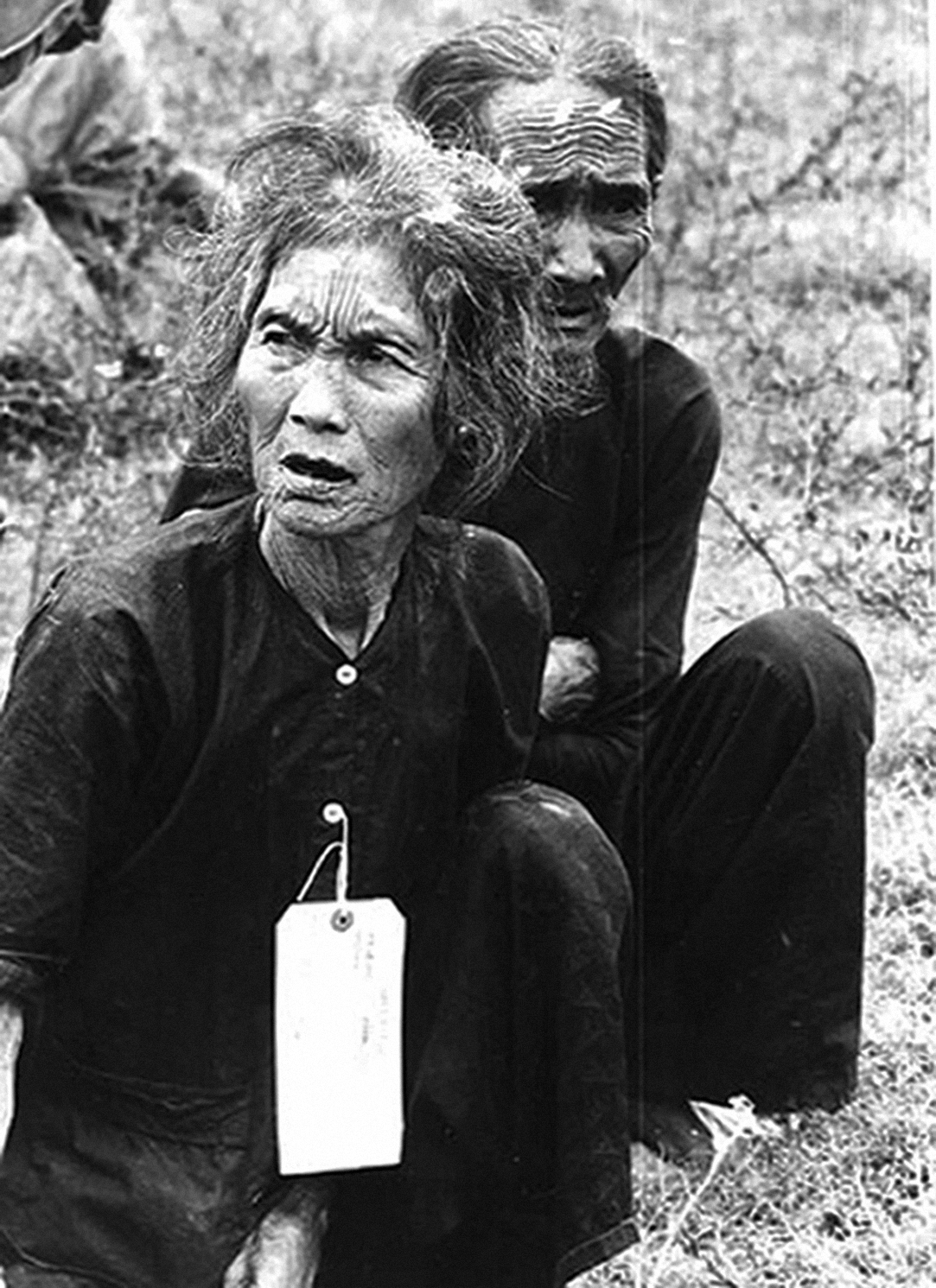
Vietnamese peasants detained on suspicion of Viet Cong affiliation as part of the Phoenix Program.

After receiving training through the program, rural South Vietnamese forces sought to penetrate communist organizations and arrest, interrogate or kill their cadres. South Vietnamese forces also utilized torture, became entangled in local and official corruption, and were responsible for many questionable killings, possibly thousands.

In his memoirs, Helms noted that the early program was "successful and of serious concern to the [North Vietnamese] leadership," but recounted the program's progressive slide into corruption and violence which came to nullify its early success. By the time it was discontinued, Phoenix had become useless in the field and a notorious political liability.

Helms attributed the corruption to Vietnamese forces acting against American instruction:

PHOENIX was directed and staffed by Vietnamese over whom the American advisors and liaison officers did not have command or direct supervision. The American staff did its best to eliminate the abuse of authority—the settling of personal scores, rewarding of friends, summary executions, prisoner mistreatment, false denunciation, illegal property seizure—that became the by-products of the PHOENIX counterinsurgency effort. In the blood-soaked atmosphere created by Viet Cong terrorism, the notion that regulations and directives imposed by foreign liaison officers could be expected to curb revenge and profit-making was unrealistic.

Despite these faults, Colby later opined that the program did stop Viet Cong gains and compared it favorably to the "secret war" in Laos. According to historian and journalist Stanley Karnow, Vietnamese communist leaders and military commanders also found the program a very effective obstacle to their success, and the official North Vietnamese history of the war identified the Phoenix Program and Marine Corps as among the most effective American counterinsurgency operations.

==== Vietnamization period (1969–73) ====
Under Richard Nixon, the United States pursued a policy of Vietnamization, emphasizing peace negotiations with the North and turning greater responsibility for military and intelligence operations over to the South Vietnamese, permitting the United States to secure, in Nixon's words, "peace with honor." While withdrawing American ground troops, Nixon simultaneously sought to increase bargaining power by escalating airstrikes and heavy bombing of Vietnam, Laos and Cambodia, and widened the scope of the conflict by covertly invading Cambodia. The Nixon administration posited the conflict as a critically important theater of the broader Cold War and directed Helms to focus on Vietnam.

The new strategy clashed with the advice of Helms and CIA analysts, whom national security advisor Henry Kissinger referred to as representing "the most liberal school of thought in the government." As a result of Vietnamization, Helms was forced to wind down many CIA operations in the region, including civic projects and paramilitary operations. The Phoenix Program was turned over to Vietnamese direction and control. The war in Laos, which was becoming difficult to maintain secret, was transferred to the Department of Defense.

Although Nixon also relied on Helms to produce reports on China, as the administration sought to open relations with Mao Zedong to foster conflict within the communist world, he shut the CIA out of his diplomatic plans to travel to China in 1972. Shortly before his visit, Kissinger ordered Helms to halt all CIA operations in China, including Tibet.

=== Israel and Six-Day War (1967) ===
As DCI, Helms was a proponent of cooperation and coordination with Israeli intelligence under the management of counterintelligence head James Jesus Angleton, who had led CIA-Mossad liaisons since 1953. At the time, Israel was non-aligned between the United States and Soviet Union, but the nation moved significantly closer to the United States during Helms's tenure.

In August 1966, Mossad acquired a Soviet MiG-21 from a disaffected Iraqi pilot, and Meir Amit visited Washington loan the plane to the United States for inspection. At a May 1967 National Security Council meeting, Helms praised Israeli military preparedness and argued that the MiG-21 demonstrated that the Israelis "had learned their lessons well."

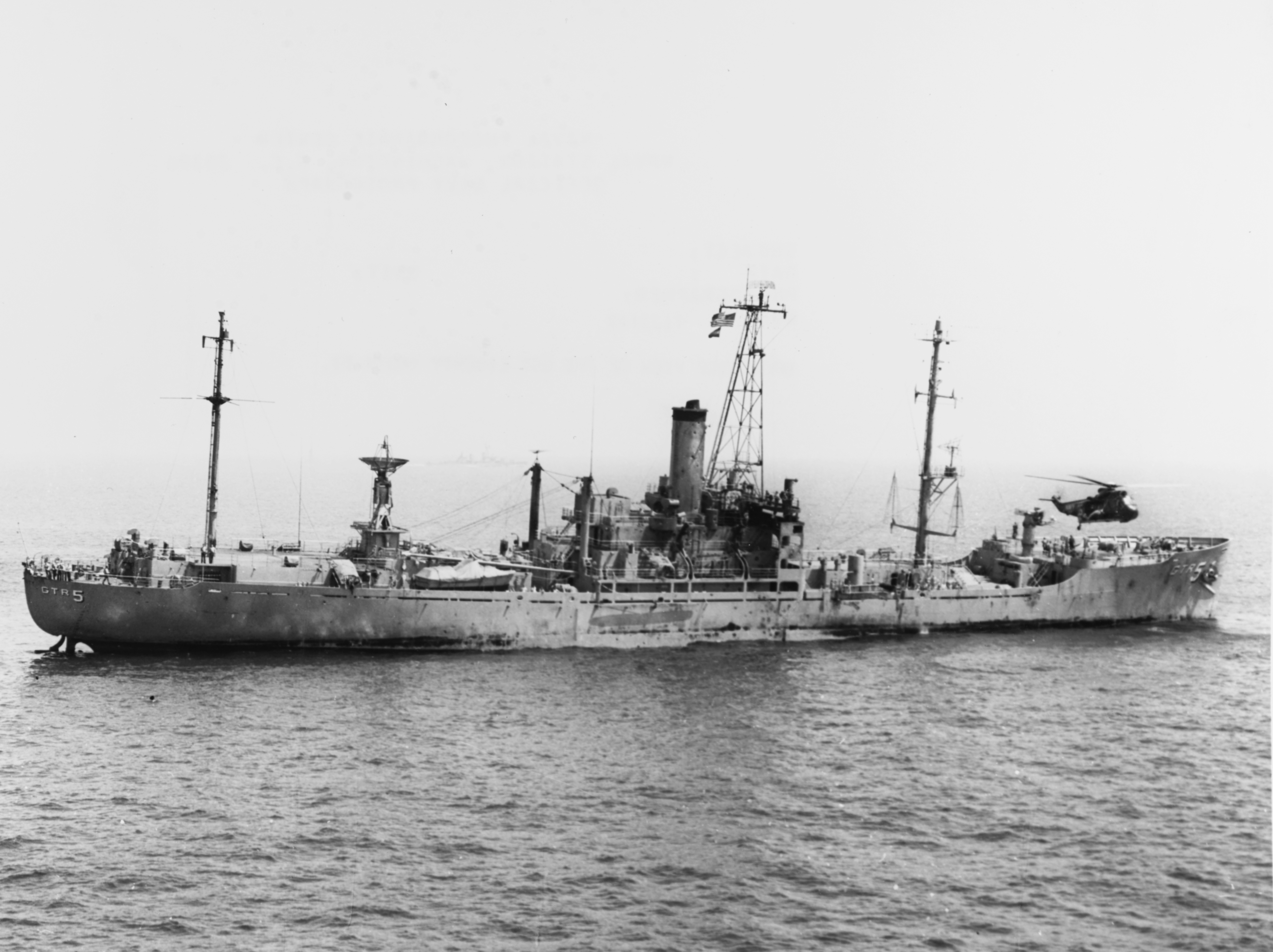
Helms repeatedly expressed skepticism over the official Israeli explanation for the USS Liberty incident.

In 1967, CIA analysis by Sherman Kent predicted that in the event of an armed conflict between Israel and neighboring Arab states, "the Israelis would win a war within a week to ten days," The analysis was challenged by U.N. ambassador Arthur Goldberg and the Israeli government under Levi Eshkol, which appealed to Lyndon B. Johnson for additional American support. Unbeknownst to the Americans and Israelis, Soviet intelligence also expected an Arab victory. Helms and other top Johnson advisors stood by the CIA prediction, which ultimately proved correct. Helms later reflected that Israel sought to minimize their strength to control international expectations prior to the outbreak of war.

Four days before the sudden launch of the Six-Day War in June 1967, a senior Israeli official visited Helms privately and hinted that a preemptive war was imminent. Helms passed the information on to the president. In the afternoon of the third day of the war, the American signals intelligence spy ship USS Liberty was attacked by Israeli warplanes and torpedo boats in international waters north of the Sinai Peninsula, resulting in severe damage and massive casualties. Israel notified the United States and claimed that they had mistaken the Liberty for the Egyptian coastal steamer El Quseir, despite the Liberty being much longer than the El Quseir (455 feet versus 275 feet). The United States government formally accepted the apology and the explanation. In a 1984 CIA interview, Helms said, "I don't think there can be any doubt that the Israelis knew exactly what they were doing. Why they wanted to attack the Liberty, whose bright idea this was, I can't possibly know. But any statement to the effect that they didn't know that it was an American ship and so forth is nonsense." In his memoirs, Helms expressed his continued shock:

"[Few] in Washington could believe that the ship had not been identified as an American naval vessel. Later, an interim intelligence memorandum concluded the attack was a mistake and 'not made in malice against the U.S.' When additional evidence was available, more doubt was raised. ... I have yet to understand why it was felt necessary to attack this ship or who ordered the attack."

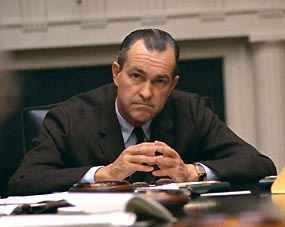
During the final years of the Lyndon B. Johnson presidency, Helms became a trusted advisor and participant in weekly lunch meetings.

On the morning of the sixth day of the war, Johnson summoned Helms to advise on the prospect of Soviet intervention in the war following threats from Alexei Kosygin. In the event, Israel decisively defeated the combined Arab army with no direct Soviet intervention. Stansfield Turner later wrote that Helms claimed the accurate provision of CIA intelligence relating to the Six-Day War was "the high point of his career," and Helms believed it had kept America out of the conflict.

The accurate intelligence concerning the duration, logistics, and outcome of the war also led to Helms's entry into Johnson's inner circle and regular attendance at Tuesday lunch with the President. The conflict also increased American sympathy for Israel. Following the war, America moved toward decisive support for Israel, eventually supplanting France as Israel's chief military supplier.

In a 1984 interview with a CIA historian, Helms recalled:

And I think at that time he'd made up his mind that it would be a good idea to tie intelligence into the inner circle of his policy-making and decision-making process. So starting from that time he began to invite me to the Tuesday lunches, and I remained a member of that group until the end of his administration.

For the remainder of the Johnson administration, Helms functioned in proximity to high-level policymaking, with continuous access to top political leadership.

[W]e gathered for a sherry in the family living room on the second floor of the White House. If the President, who normally kept to a tight schedule, was a few minutes late, he would literally bound into the room, pause long enough to acknowledge our presence, and herd us into the family dining room, overlooking Pennsylvania Avenue. Seating followed protocol, with the secretary of state (Dean Rusk) at the President's right, and the secretary of defense (Robert McNamara, later Clark Clifford) at his left. General Bus Wheeler (the Chairman of the Joint Chiefs of Staff) sat beside the secretary of defense. I sat beside Dean Rusk. Walt Rostow (the Special Assistant for National Security Affairs), George Christian (the White House Press Secretary), and Tom Johnson (the deputy press secretary) made up the rest of the table.

As a neutral party within the meetings, Helms supplied the others with facts applicable to the issue at hand. Helms later commented he used this position to steer the conversation.

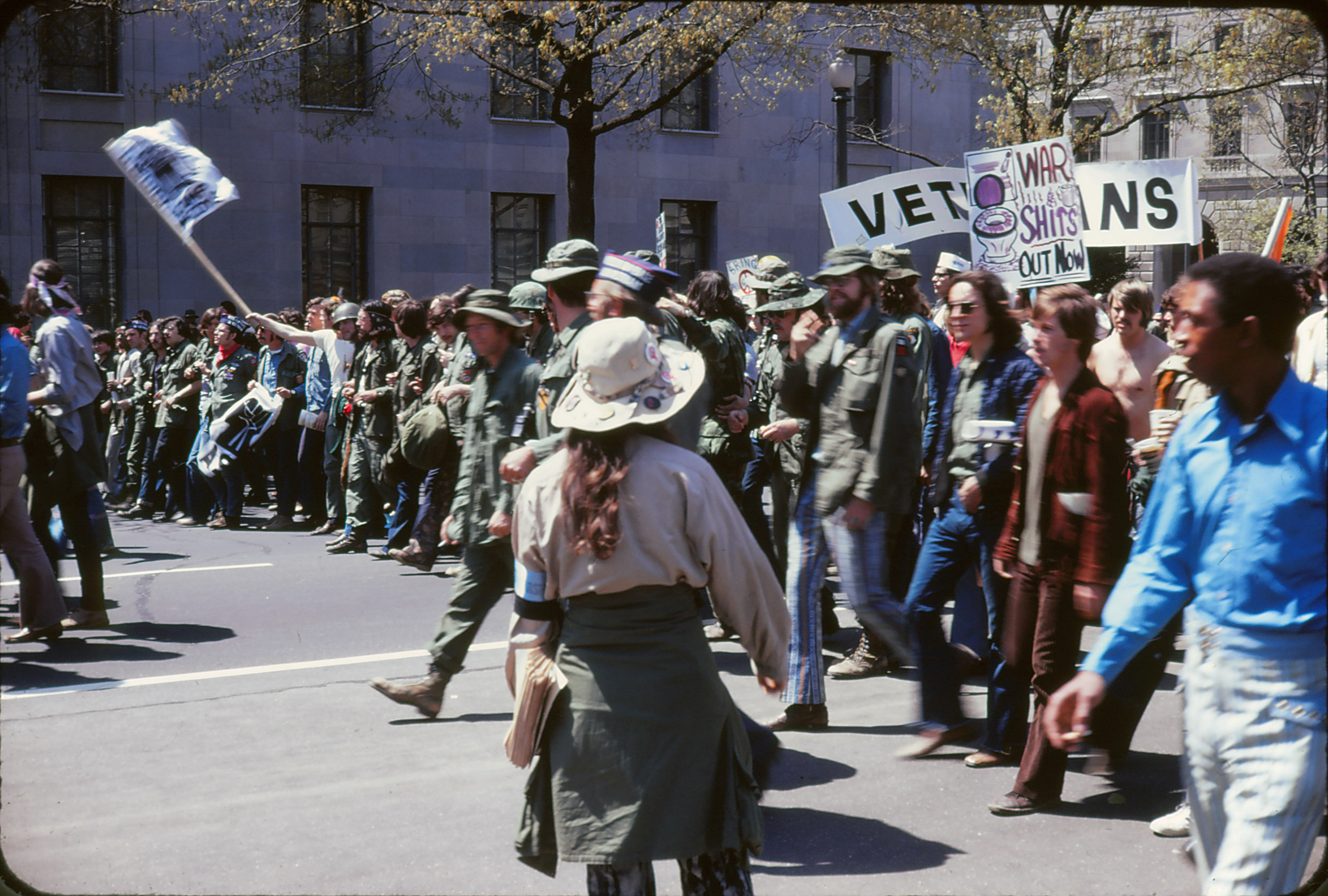
Operation CHAOS was the investigation of alleged foreign infiltration of the anti-war movement via tactics which were dubiously legal under the CIA charter.

=== Operation CHAOS ===
From 1967 to 1974, under both the Johnson and Nixon administrations, Helms and the CIA were tasked with domestic surveillance of protest movements, particularly anti-war protestors and activists. These surveillance operations were referred to as Operation CHAOS. The investigations were based on the theory that these movements were funded or influenced by foreign actors, especially the Soviet Union and other communist states, amid a sudden rise in anti-war activism.

As part of CHAOS, the CIA counterintelligence office under James Jesus Angleton clandestinely gathered extensive information on many anti-war groups, Ramparts magazine, and others, eventually building thousands of clandestine files on American citizens as a prerequisite to foreign espionage. CIA agents sought to use the information to acquire credibility to use as cover when overseas. On that rationale, the operation continued for almost seven years, hidden from nearly all agency personnel outside of the counterintelligence office.

The operation initially found no substantial foreign sources of money or influence, but when Helms reported these findings to the Johnson, his reaction was hostile. Helms later wrote that Johnson "simply could not believe that American youth would on their own be moved to riot in protest against U. S. foreign policy." Accordingly, Johnson escalated the program.

Richard Nixon later extended the reach and scope of CHAOS and other domestic surveillance activity, convinced that domestic dissent was initiated and nurtured by Soviet agents. In 1969, intra-agency opposition to CHAOS arose, and CIA general counsel Lawrence R. Houston advised Helms on an official memorandum to justify the operation to officers and agents. Nixon planned to subsume the operation under the Huston Plan, a broader multi-agency investigative effort involving the CIA, FBI, Defense Intelligence Agency, and National Security Agency, but the plan was never adopted.

CIA critics have long derided Operation CHAOS as outright illegal or on the fringes of legality, as the CIA was ostensibly forbidden from operating on U.S. soil. Helms later claimed that he pointed this out to President Johnson, who responded, "I'm quite aware of that," and instructed Helms to maintain focus on foreign involvement. Later, both the Rockefeller Commission and the Church Committee found the initial investigation to be within the margins of the CIA's legislative charter. Critics have also noted that the operation made no clear distinction between extreme and mainstream opposition to American involvement in the Vietnam War. Operation CHAOS was also opposed by the Federal Bureau of Investigation (FBI) under J. Edgar Hoover, who viewed surveillance of subversive activity as the FBI's jurisdiction. Although the FBI did conduct such operations within the U.S., the bureau refused to provide any context or analysis.

=== Relationship with Richard Nixon (1968–73) ===
Following Richard Nixon's victory in the 1968 presidential election, Johnson invited Nixon to his ranch in Texas, where he was introduced Dean Rusk, Clark Clifford, Earle Wheeler, and Helms. Johnson privately told Helms that he had represented him to Nixon as a political neutral, "a merit appointment", and a career federal official who was good at his job. Nixon invited Helms to his headquarters in New York City, where Nixon told Helms that he and J. Edgar Hoover would be retained as "appointments out of the political arena."

==== Diminishing role of CIA ====
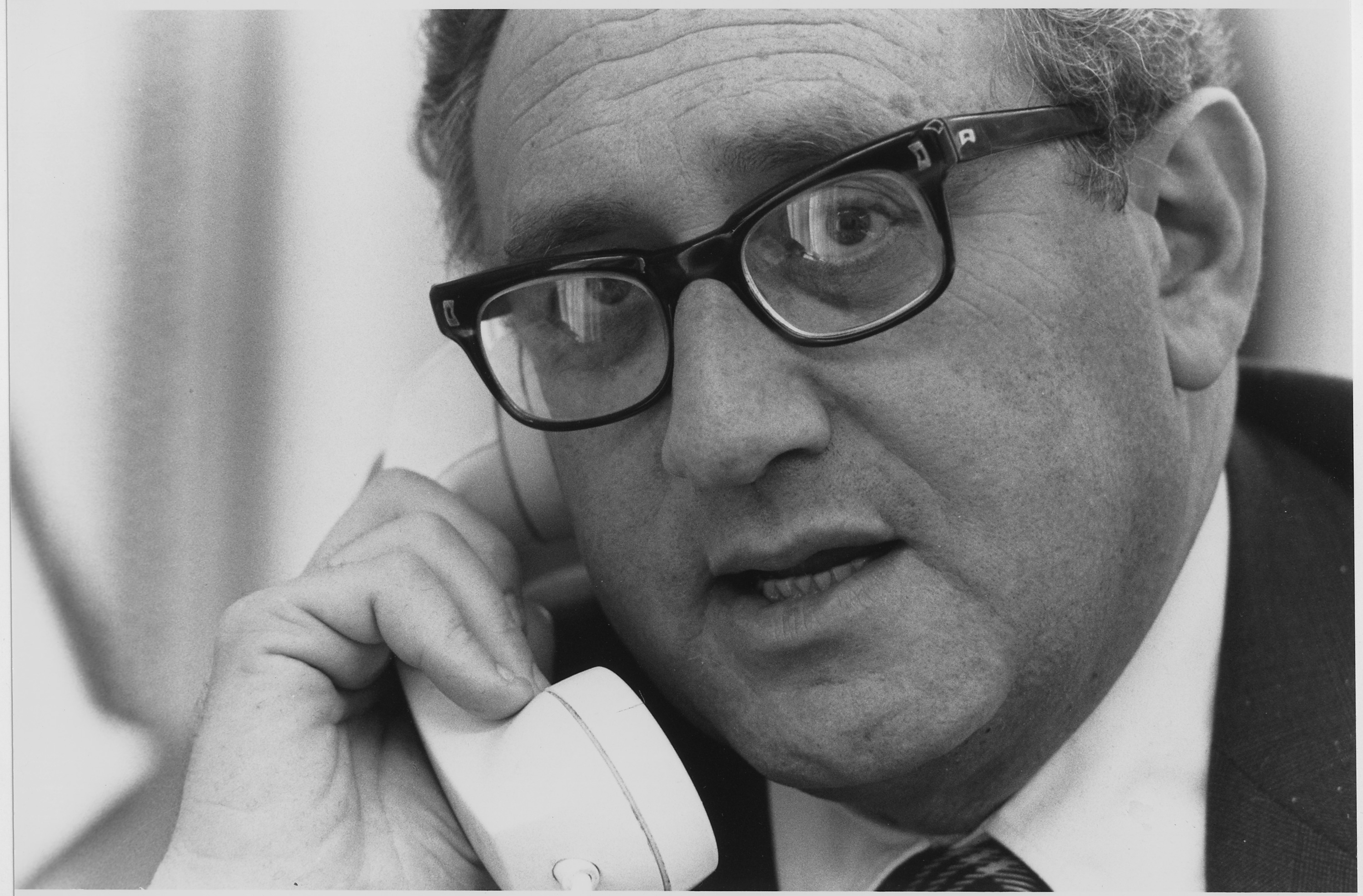
During the presidency of Richard Nixon, Henry Kissinger supplanted Helms as chief intelligence advisor to the president.

Nixon dramatically limited the role of the CIA in his administration and interacted very little with Helms directly. In order to dominate policy, Nixon isolated himself from the Washington bureaucracy, which he viewed with distrust. Conversations with advisors, even cabinet members, were screened by H. R. Haldeman and John Ehrlichman, and Henry Kissinger advised Nixon directly on national security and intelligence. Kissinger conveyed Nixon's instructions to the CIA and other intelligence services, and all intelligence briefings were delivered through Kissinger. Nixon and Kissinger understood that they alone would "conceive, command, and control clandestine operations" through the National Security Council.

Under Nixon's initial intention, Helms was even excluded from the policy discussions at NSC meetings. Nixon found Helms pedantic and tiresome because of his practice of reading directly from CIA reports at meetings.

In his memoirs, Stansfield Turner described Nixon as hostile to the CIA, questioning its utility, practical value, and politics, which he viewed as liberal and elitist and having aided his political enemies. In a 1988 interview, Helms agreed, "Nixon never trusted anybody." Despite this, Helms later wrote that Nixon was "the best prepared to be President of any of those under whom I served" and "had the best grasp of foreign affairs and domestic politics."

When Nixon attended NSC meetings, he would often direct his personal animosity and ire toward the CIA directly at Helms, and Helms found it difficult to establish a cordial working relationship with the new president. In addition to the change in policy direction, Kissinger later wrote that Nixon "felt ill at ease with Helms personally." Ray Cline wrote that Nixon used Helms and the CIA "primarily as an instrument for the execution of White House wishes" and did not "understand or care about the carefully structured functions of central intelligence as a whole. ... I doubt that anyone could have done better than Helms in these circumstances."

One incident exemplifying tensions between the CIA and the Nixon administration was the revelation of Soviet long-range missiles, code-named the SS-9 Scarp. The CIA reported that these missiles lacked multiple independently targetable reentry vehicle (MIRV) capability, but the Defense Intelligence Agency (DIA) reported that they did have MIRV capability, suggesting Soviet intent to achieve first strike nuclear capacity. The Nixon administration, seeking to justify a new American anti-ballistic missile system, publicly endorsed the DIA position. Kissinger asked Helms to review the CIA finding, which Helms initially stood by. Eventually, however, Helms compromised under pressure from Secretary of Defense Melvin Laird, who told Helms that the CIA was outside its authority and "subverted administration policy." Helms later remembered:

I realized that there was no convincing evidence in the Agency or at the Pentagon which would prove either position. Both positions were estimates—speculation—based on identical fragments of data. My decision to remove [the language contested by the Nixon administration] was based on the fact that the Agency's estimate—that the USSR was not attempting to create a first-strike capability – as originally stated in the earlier detailed National Estimate would remain the Agency position.

According to author John Ranelagh, at least one analyst involved in the report viewed Helms's reversal as not only "a cave-in on a matter of high principle ... but also as a public slap in the face from his director, a vote of no confidence in his work." A few years later, the nature of the Soviet SS-9 missiles became better understood, and the CIA analysis was vindicated. According to Ranelagh, "The consensus among agency analysts was that Dick Helms had not covered himself with glory this time."

==== Watergate ====
After first learning of the break-in at the Watergate Office Building on June 17, 1972, in which those arrested included former CIA agent E. Howard Hunt and other former CIA assets, Helms developed a general strategy to distance the CIA from the break-in altogether, including subsequent third-party investigations of Nixon's role. Helms and DDCI Vernon Walters became convinced that top CIA officials had no role in the break-in, but it soon became apparent that it was "impossible to prove anything to an inflamed national press corps already in full cry" and "daily leaks to the press kept pointing at CIA." Later, Helms argued that "the leaks were coming directly from the White House," and that Nixon was personally directing them.

On June 23, 1972, Nixon and Haldeman discussed asking Helms for his assistance to deter the FBI investigation of the Watergate break-in. During the discussion, Nixon said "well, we protected Helms from one hell of a lot of things". Haldeman, Ehrlichman, and John Dean asked Helms to assert a national security reason for the break-in and, under that rationale, interfere with the ongoing FBI investigation on the grounds of state secrecy and post bail for the arrested suspects. Helms initially stalled the FBI's progress for several weeks. At several meetings attended by Helms and Walters, Nixon's team referred to the Cuban Bay of Pigs fiasco as an implied threat against the integrity of CIA. Helms reacted sharply against this gambit. Stansfield Turner called this "perhaps the best and most courageous decision of [Helms's] career." White House Counsel John Dean reportedly asked for $1 million to buy the silence of the jailed Watergate burglars. In a 1988 interview, Helms stated that he believed a bribe would have been possible, but he declined because the scandal would have resulted in the end of the CIA.

Although Helms ultimately succeeded in shielding the CIA from direct implication in Watergate, the scandal ultimately became a major factor in American public opinion shifting against the agency, and its political role became the subject of controversy in the following years.

==== Dismissal ====
After Nixon's re-election in 1972, he called for all appointed officials to resign. Because Helms did not consider his position at CIA political, he did not resign. On November 20, Helms came to Camp David to an interview with Nixon and chief of staff H.R. Haldeman, at which Helms was informed that his services in the new administration would not be required. William Colby later commented that Helms "paid the price" for declining the White House requests with respect to Watergate.

After Nixon was reminded that Helms was a career civil servant and not a political appointee, Nixon offered him the ambassadorship to the Soviet Union. Helms declined, wary of the potential implications of his appointment from the Soviet perspective, considering his long career in intelligence. Instead, Helms proposed being sent to Iran, where Mohammad Reza Pahlavi, who had studied at Le Rosey with Helms's brother, was the reigning monarch and the Nixon administration sought to strengthen American ties. Nixon dismissed ambassador Joseph S. Farland to create an opening for Helms.

Although Helms suggested that he might voluntarily retire at the end of March, after turning 60, he was abruptly dismissed on February 2, 1973, when James R. Schlesinger was named the new DCI. Helms later wrote,

"The timing caught me by surprise. ... A few days later, I encountered Haldeman. 'What happened to our understanding that my exit would be postponed for a few weeks?' I asked. 'Oh, I guess we forgot,' he said with the faint trace of a smile. And so it was over."

As one of his final acts, Helms ordered that all files pertaining to the MKUltra program be destroyed. When the program was exposed to the public in 1975, the Church Committee and Rockefeller Commission investigations were both forced to rely on the sworn testimony of direct participants and a small number of documents that survived Helms's order.

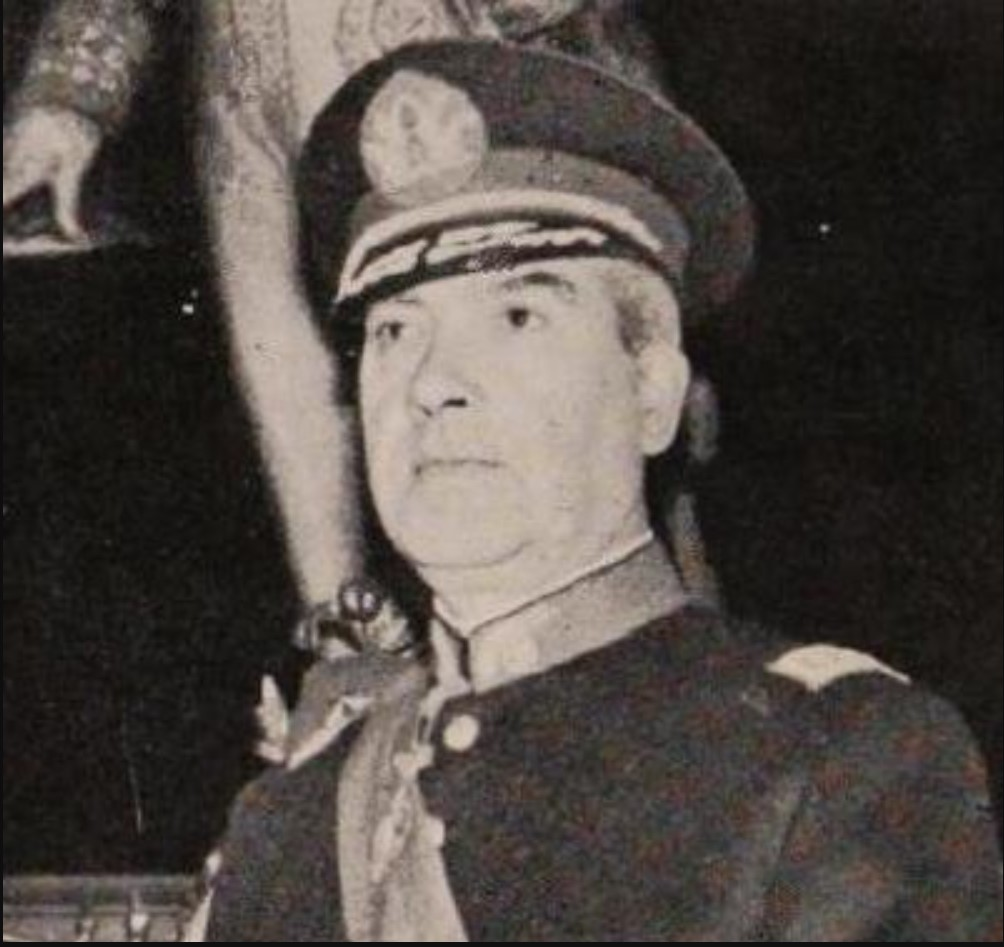
In Project FUBELT, CIA agents encouraged the Chilean army to disrupt the inauguration of Salvador Allende. Rogue Chilean officers who had met with CIA agents killed Commander-in-Chief René Schneider (1913–1970).

=== Project FUBELT ===
Following the victory of Salvador Allende in the 1970 Chilean presidential election, Richard Nixon ordered the CIA to surveil Allende and interfere with his socialist domestic policies, an operation code-named Project FUBELT. Despite CIA efforts, Allende was successfully inaugurated as president of Chile, and Project FUBELT declined in intensity. On September 11, 1973, after Helms had left the CIA, a military coup led by Augusto Pinochet violently ended the democratically elected Allende regime.

During the 1970 election, the United States government sent financial and other assistance to two candidates opposing Allende. According to Helms, President Nixon ordered him on September 15, 1970 to covertly support the Chilean military in preventing Allende from taking office as president. "He wanted something done and he didn't care how," Helms later characterized the order. The order was termed "Track II" to distinguish it from the CIA's covert funding of opposition to Allende, called "Track I". Accordingly, the CIA took assorted covert actions to pressure the Chilean army to seize power. CIA agents were in communication with rogue elements within the Chilean military who later assassinated General René Schneider, the Army Commander-in-Chief, over his perceived constitutionalism, but the CIA broke off contact before his assassination and discouraged assassination. After the assassination, the Chilean army swung firmly behind Allende, and he was inaugurated as president on November 3, 1970. Nixon and Kissinger blamed Helms for Allende's presidency.

Despite this failure, the CIA continued to funnel millions of dollars to Chilean opposition groups, including political parties, media, and striking truck drivers in order to destabilize Chile's economy and subvert the Allende administration. In Nixon's own words, the United States policy was "to make the Chilean economy scream." Despite these efforts, Helms later wrote, "In my remaining months in office, Allende continued his determined march to the left, but there was no further effort to instigate a coup in Chile." Although he disagreed with Nixon's policy in Chile, Helms nevertheless carried out his instructions. Author Tim Weiner contradicted Helms in 2007, arguing that the CIA worked diligently to cultivate military officers willing to commit to a coup.

Helms left the CIA on February 2, 1973, seven months before the coup d'etat in Chile. Nixon continued to work directly against the Allende regime; he was ultimately deposed in a 1973 coup d'état and died under suspicious circumstances, officially ruled a suicide. The civil violence of the military coup and subsequent Pinochet regime provoked widespread international censure.

== Ambassador to Iran (1973–77) ==
After Helms left the CIA, he was confirmed by the U.S. Senate as the new U.S. ambassador to Iran and proceeded to Tehran in April 1973. He would continue to serve until January 1977, when Jimmy Carter replaced him with William H. Sullivan. Much of his tenure as ambassador was interrupted by congressional hearings and investigations into CIA activities, including CIA involvement in Watergate. As a result of these investigations, he frequently had to return to the United States to testify.

During the course of his service as ambassador, Helms dealt with the 1973 oil crisis, the 1975 Algiers Agreement between Iran and Iraq, and the subsequent abandonment of support for Kurdish separatism in Iraq. In 1976, Helms informed Kissinger, now serving as Secretary of State under President Gerald Ford, of his plan to resign as ambassador before the presidential election. Helms, who was facing increased scrutiny from a grand jury in Washington over CIA activities, submitted his resignation to President Ford in October 1976.

=== Relationships with Iranian leadership ===
Helms had an amicable relationship with both the Shah and Hoveyda. Helms later claimed that he had first met the Shah in 1957, when he visited Tehran to negotiate permission to install intercept equipment in northern Iran for the purpose of espionage against the Soviet Union. According to William Shawcross, the United States and its European allies had "almost uncritical approval of the Shah. ... Too much had been invested in the Shah—by European nations as well as by the U.S.—for any real changes in policy."

Despite the Shah's reputation for a dominating personal style, Helms established a working relationship with him. In his memoirs, he recorded lively one-on-one conversations with "polite give-and-take" at social functions or in private offices. However, Helms followed the practice of other diplomats and respected the Shah's prohibition on contact with domestic political opposition in Iran. Shawcross describes a "shallow pool of courtiers, industrialists, lawyers, and others who were somehow benefiting from the material success of the regime" that surrounded and insulted the diplomatic corps. Helms circulated widely among traditional Iranian elites, forming a close friendship with the aristocrat Ahmad Goreishi. Even the CIA was insulated from Iranian politics, relying entirely on SAVAK for intelligence during this period. The U.S. State Department began to question this practice during Helms's final year in Iran. As a result of these practices, the United States remained largely ignorant of Iranian opposition to American presence in the country, including intense anger over American involvement in the 1953 coup d'état which deposed prime minister Mohammad Mosaddegh.

According to Shawcross, Helms "came to realize that he could never understand the Iranians." Helms himself observed, "They have a very different turn of mind. Here would be ladies, dressed in Parisian clothes. ... But before they went on trips abroad, they would ship up to Mashhad in chadors to ask for protection." In a May 1976 memo, he added, "Iranian government and society are highly structured and authoritarian, and all major decisions are made at the top. Often, even relatively senior officials are not well informed about policies and plans and have little influence on them." In July 1976, Helms transmitted a message to the U.S. Department of State voicing concerns regarding about inadequate "political institutionalization" which left the regime vulnerable. Historian Abbas Milani commented that Helms "captured the nature of the Shah's vulnerability when he wrote that, 'The conflict between rapid economic growth and modernization vis-à-vis a still autocratic rule' was the greatest uncertainty about the shah's future."

=== Relationship with the Soviet Union ===
As a result of his CIA background, the Soviet Union took Helms's appointment as ambassador to a neighboring anti-communist regime as a signal of United States aggression. Throughout the prior decades, the CIA had operated extensive technical installations across the northern border of Iran to monitor Soviet air traffic, and the CIA, Mossad, and U.S. Agency for International Development trained and supported the Iranian intelligence and police agency SAVAK. The United States also assisted Iran in its support of Kurdish nationalists against the government of Iraq. Upon his arrival in the country, Helms reformed embassy security, and a CIA officer accompanied him wherever he went.

In one possibly apocryphal story told in elite circles about the appointment, the Soviet ambassador told prime minister Amir-Abbas Hoveyda, "We hear the Americans are sending their number one spy to Iran." Hoveyda replied, "The Americans are our friends. At least they don't send us their number ten spy."

=== Middle Eastern diplomacy ===
Helms's position as ambassador made him the chief American diplomat in the broader Middle East. During his first year as ambassador, Helms managed the American reaction to Yom Kippur War, subsequent OAPEC embargo on oil exports, and resulting oil crisis. Immediately following the start of the embargo, Helms requested fueling favors for the United States Navy near Bandar Abbas, which the Shah granted. Then, flush with oil revenues, the Shah placed orders for foreign imports and American military hardware, including high performance warplanes. In his memoirs, Helms wrote, "Foreign businessmen flooded Tehran. Few had any knowledge of the country; fewer could speak a word of Persian. ... There is no doubt [the Shah] tried to go too fast, which led to the ports' congestion and the overheating of the economy." The bonanza led to accelerated corruption within the Iranian civil service, involving enormous sums.

In March 1975, Helms learned the Shah had negotiated a major agreement with Saddam Hussein of Iraq at an OPEC meeting in Algiers, mediated by Algerian head of state Houari Boumédiène. As part of the deal, the shah had disowned support for Kurdish separatists in Iraq, surprising Helms, the United States government, and the Shah's own ministers. As a result, the CIA abandoned support for Kurdish nationalism.

== Public scrutiny and conviction (1973–77) ==
The Watergate scandal, which implicated E. Howard Hunt and several other former CIA assets, and the Nixon administration's effort to use state secrets privilege in the cover-up intensified public attitudes against abuse of state secrecy, and multiple public investigations were opened into the American intelligence community. In addition to Watergate, revelations of apparent distortions and dishonesty regarding the progress of the war in Vietnam gravely eroded American public trust in government. The emergence of internal whistleblowers, such as Daniel Ellsberg, the growing prevalence of conspiracy theories regarding the John F. Kennedy assassination, and leaked details of the "systemized abuse of power" by FBI director J. Edgar Hoover also fueled public distrust. Accordingly, the CIA became a subject of congressional inquiry and media interest. The scrutiny grew as investigators publicized questionable CIA secret activities, including the 1974 release of excerpts from "family jewels", a 1973 report detailing CIA malfeasance by Seymour Hersh. Helms was frequently called to testify before congressional committees and was ultimately convicted for perjury for lying to Congress in his testimony regarding CIA activities in Chile.

=== Congressional and presidential investigations into CIA ===
During the early stages of the Cold War, members of Congress had deliberately allowed the CIA to operate outside the boundaries of politically acceptable conduct or accountability, judging that its espionage and covert activities should be exempt from any public scrutiny to avoid communist subversion. In early 1975, following the resignation of Richard Nixon and independent press investigations into Operation CHAOS and the "family jewels," as well as the Democratic landslide in the 1974 midterm elections, Congress reversed that practice by establishing committees in both the Senate and the House, chaired by Frank Church and Otis G. Pike, respectively. President Gerald Ford established a commission to investigate domestic surveillance, chaired by vice president Nelson Rockefeller.

Including the Watergate Committee, Helms testified thirteen times "before various official bodies of investigation" between 1973 and 1977. In addition to the special committees and Rockefeller Commission, Helms testified before the Senate Select Committee on Intelligence, Senate Committee on Armed Services, Senate Committee on Foreign Affairs, House Committee on Armed Services, and House Foreign Affairs Committee. He defended the use of secrecy as an essential, utilitarian value to the government, necessary to conduct espionage and covert operations. Helms expressed dismay over the publication and investigations themselves, especially when they resulted in the publication of sensitive classified information. At points during the many hours of testimony given by Helms before Congress, his frustration and irritation with the direction of the proceedings are clearly discernible. In December 1975, Richard Welch, the CIA station chief in Athens who had been exposed by classified leaks, was murdered.

Before testifying, Helms and John McCone were informed by a CIA officer regarding the contours of congressional knowledge. According to author Thomas Powers, both McCone and Helms thus tailored their testimony to limit the scope of discussion to matters already known by the committee. Helms' testimony, which made headlines, amounted to a circumspect, professional defense of the agency. However, his testimony was contradicted by that of DCI William Colby before Congress.

=== Conviction for lying to Congress ===
In February 1973, during his confirmation hearings before the Senate Foreign Relations Committee to become Ambassador to Iran, Helms was questioned concerning CIA operations in Chile and the deposition of Salvador Allende. Because he considered the operation a state secret, Helms denied that the CIA had aided the opponents of Allende. He repeated the denial a few days later, before a committee chaired by Frank Church to investigate claims of involvement by International Telephone and Telegraph.

In 1975, the new Church Committee uncovered information directly contradicting Helms's February 1973 statements. In 1977, he was prosecuted by the Department of Justice for misleading Congress. Helms pled nolo contendere to two lesser, misdemeanor charges that he had not "fully, completely and accurately" testified to Congress, and he was sentenced to a two-year suspended sentence and a $2,000 fine. At sentencing, Judge Barrington D. Parker condemned Helms:

"You considered yourself bound to protect the Agency [and so] to dishonor your solemn oath to tell the truth ... If public officials embark deliberately on a course to disobey and ignore the laws of our land because of some misguided and ill-conceived notion and belief that there are earlier commitments and considerations which they must observe, the future of our country is in jeopardy."

Helms's defense attorney, Edward Bennett Williams, said, "He was sworn not to disclose the very things that he was being requested by the [Senate] Committee to disclose," and would "wear this conviction like a badge of honor, like a banner." Helms continued to enjoy the support of many current and retired CIA officers, including James Angleton. Because his testimony had been given at a time when politicians generally excused CIA secrecy, Helms's supporters claimed that he was unfairly held to a double standard. He received a standing ovation at a large gathering of CIA officers in Bethesda, Maryland, and the officers raised funds to pay his fine. He continued to receive support within the CIA in the following years.

== Later years ==
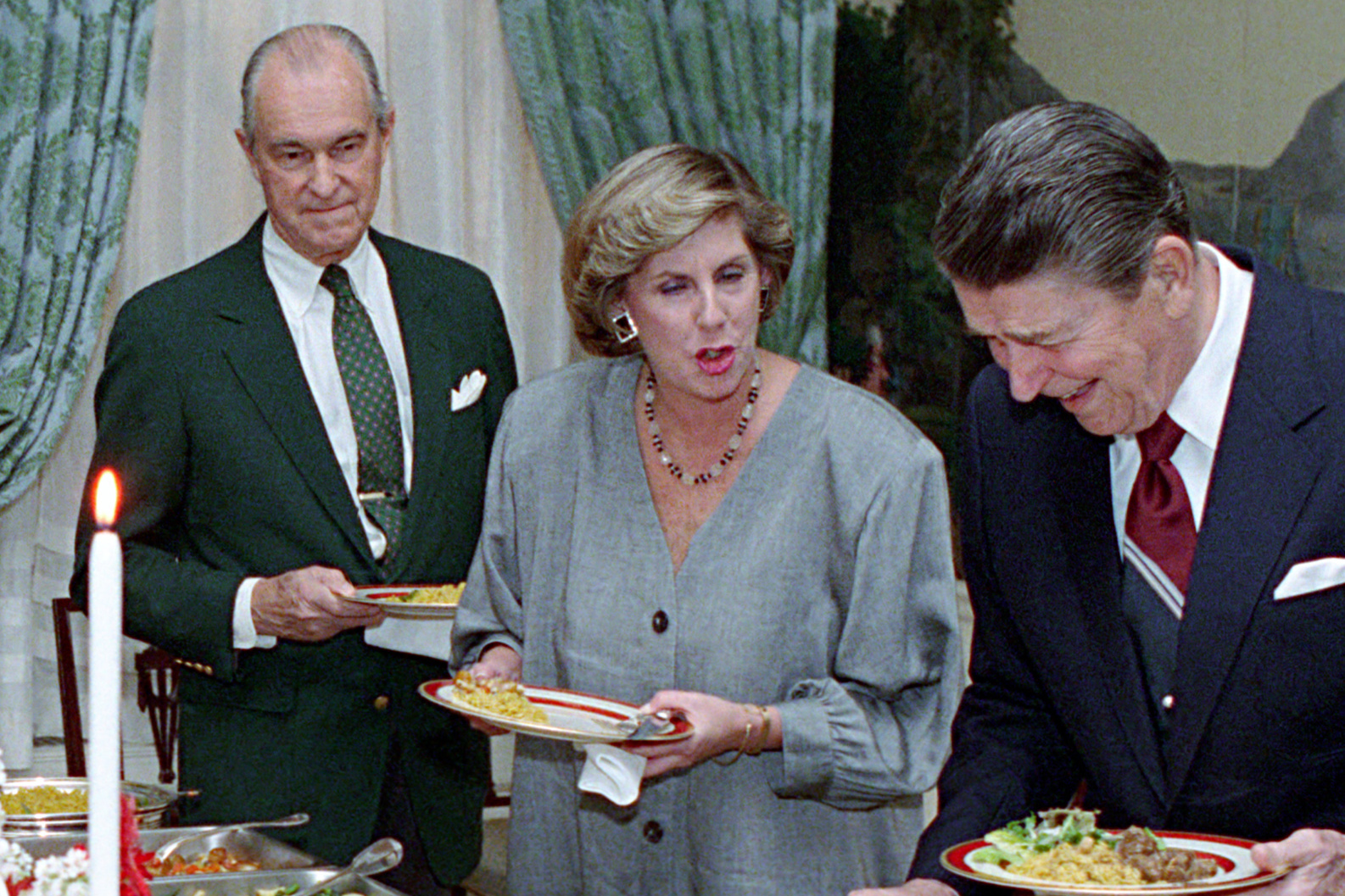
Helms (left) with Sarah Brady and President Ronald Reagan at a private dinner on the night of the 1988 elections.

After returning home from Tehran, Helms founded an international consulting company on K Street called Safeer, the Persian word for "ambassador." Although the business was established to assist Iranians seeking to do business in the United States, it was quickly transformed by the Iranian Revolution, which caught Helms by surprise, and focused instead on general consulting to businesses investing abroad.

After the 1980 election of Ronald Reagan as president, Helms was among those who supported Reagan's campaign manager, William J. Casey, for DCI. Helms had worked with Casey in the OSS during World War II. His appointment was opposed by former president Gerald Ford and vice president George Bush. In his history of the CIA under Casey, Bob Woodward attributed Helms's support to an institutional interest in the preservation of the CIA against criticism from the political right. Casey, whom Helms viewed as apolitical, would preserve the neutrality of the agency. "The danger, the threat to the CIA, came from both the right and the left," Woodward wrote. "Maybe the left had had its way in the 1970s and the investigations, causing their trouble. But the right could do its own mischief."

As a consequence of William Westmoreland's libel lawsuit against CBS News for its 1982 documentary The Uncounted Enemy, Helms was deposed by CBS attorneys. CBS insisted on video-taping Helms's deposition, but he successfully challenged the request.

In 1983, Helms was awarded the National Security Medal by Reagan and served as a member of the president's Commission on National Security. He also received the Donovan Award at a Washington banquet held in honor of him and William J. Donovan.

=== Interviews and memoirs ===
In 1979, Helms was interviewed by journalist Thomas Powers about his years of service in the CIA over four mornings. The resulting transcript totaled about 300 pages and produced the book The Man who Kept the Secrets: Richard Helms and the CIA. In his memoirs, Helms wrote, "In the event, the book's title ... seemed to bear out my intention in speaking to Powers." He sat for repeated interviews over the remainder of his life. In 1978, he was interviewed by British television personality David Frost. In 1982–84, he was interviewed by Agency historian Robert M. Hathaway and by his former DDCI Russell Jack Smith for a classified, 1993 CIA biography. He sat for additional CIA interviews through 1988. In 1969 and 1981, Helms had participated in interviews for the Lyndon Baines Johnson Library and Museum. Other interviews were conducted by Edward Jay Epstein, Thomas Powers, John Ranelagh, William Shawcross, and Bob Woodward.

Helms's memoirs, A Look Over My Shoulder: A Life in the Central Intelligence Agency, were published posthumously in 2003 by Random House. Former OSS and CIA agent William Hood assisted Helms with the book, and Henry Kissinger wrote the foreword.

== Personal life and death ==
In 1939, Helms married Julia Bretzman Shields, a sculptor six years his senior. Shields had two children at the time of their marriage, James and Judith. Together, Helms and Shields had a son, Dennis, who briefly worked at the CIA before becoming a lawyer. Their marriage ended in 1967.

Helms later married Cynthia McKelvie, an English woman. She wrote two books on her public experiences during their long marriage, including visits to Lyndon B. Johnson at his Texas ranch and to the Shah, who was undergoing treatment for terminal cancer in New York City following his exile from Iran. In the mid-1980s, the Helmses hosted a small dinner party at their Washington residence for President Ronald Reagan and First Lady Nancy Reagan.

Although Helms was friendly with President Johnson and conflicted with President Nixon, Helms remained publicly apolitical throughout his career. His first wife was an active member of the Democratic Party.

He frequently read spy fiction, as was common in the intelligence field, but reportedly detested The Spy Who Came in from the Cold by John le Carré, which he found centered too much on cynicism, violence, betrayal, and despair and offended his sense that espionage should be based on trust and fraternity. In his memoirs, Helms included several other books by le Carré among "the better spy novels."

He was not related to Jesse Helms.

Richard Helms died at the age of 89 of multiple myeloma on October 23, 2002. He was interred at Arlington National Cemetery in Arlington, Virginia.

== Legacy ==
In 1989, Bob Woodward referred to Helms as "one of the enduring symbols, controversies and legends of the CIA."

Despite personal conflicts with Helms, both William Colby and Henry Kissinger praised Helms as honorable and dutiful. Kissinger wrote, "There was no public servant I trusted more. His lodestar was a sense of duty." On another occasion, Kissinger said, "Disciplined, meticulously fair and discreet, Helms performed his duties with the total objectivity essential to an effective intelligence service."

Jefferson Morley of Slate magazine referred to Helms as "socially correct, bureaucratically adept, [and] operationally nasty." Both critics and supporters referred to him as urbane, professional, impeccably dressed, and elegant.

=== In media ===
- In the 1977 television miniseries Washington: Behind Closed Doors (based on John Ehrlichman's novel The Company), the character William Martin was based loosely on Helms and portrayed by Cliff Robertson.
- In the 1995 film Nixon, directed by Oliver Stone, Helms was portrayed by actor Sam Waterston. The scene featuring Helms was deleted from the original release but included in the director's cut.
- In the 2006 film The Good Shepherd, the character Richard Hayes was based loosely on Helms and portrayed by actor Lee Pace.

== Publications ==
Articles

- "The (Really) Quiet American." Washington Post (May 20, 1973), p. C2.

Books

- A Look over My Shoulder: A Life in the Central Intelligence Agency, with William Hood. New York: Random House (2003). ISBN 037550012X, 978-0375500121. OCLC 50693016.

Recordings

- "Intelligence Service in a Democracy," with Hale Boggs and Richard G. Kleindienst. New York: Encyclopedia Americana/CBS News Audio Resource Library (April 1971). OCLC 6845503.

"In an address to the nation's newspaper editors, CIA Director Richard Helms states that while he can understand Americans' inherent distaste for a peacetime intelligence gathering agency, he cannot agree that it is in conflict with the ideals of a free society."

== See also ==
- Tennent H. Bagley
- Desmond Fitzgerald
- Roscoe Hillenkoetter
- Thomas Karamessines
- Sidney Souers
- Hoyt Vandenberg

== Bibliography ==
=== Primary ===
- Richard Helms with William Hood. A Look Over My Shoulder: A Life in the Central Intelligence Agency. New York: Random House (2003).
- Thomas Powers, The Man Who Kept the Secrets: Richard Helms and the CIA. New York: Alfred A. Knopf (1979).
- Ralph E. Weber, editor, "Richard M. Helms" pp. 239–312 in Weber (1999).
  - Harold Jackson, "Richard Helms. Director of CIA whose lies about the overthrow of Allende's Chilean government led to his conviction." (October 23, 2002), obituary in The Guardian.
  - Christopher Marquis, "Richard M. Helms Dies at 89; Dashing Ex-Chief of the C.I.A." (October 23, 2002), obituary in The New York Times.
  - Jefferson Morley, "The Gentleman Planner of Assassinations. The nasty career of CIA Director Richard Helms." (November 1, 2002), obituary in Slate.
- Robert M. Hathaway & Russell Jack Smith, Richard Helms as Director of Central Intelligence 1966–1973, edited by J. Kenneth McDonald. Washington: Center for the Study of Intelligence (1993).

Written by members of the CIA's History Staff, this 230-page book (as photocopied, with white-outs) was released to the public by the Agency in 2006.

- David S. Robarge, "Richard Helms: The Intelligence Professional Personified. In memory and appreciation." (2007), CIA article.
- A Life in Intelligence - The Richard Helms Collection. Documents and literature at CIA website.

=== Secondary ===
CIA

- William Colby and Peter Forbath, Honorable Men: My Life in the CIA. New York: Simon and Schuster 1978.
- Allen Dulles, The Craft of Intelligence. New York: Harper and Row 1963, revised 1965'; reprint: Signet Books, New York, 1965.
- Stansfield Turner, Burn before Reading. Presidents, CIA Directors, and Secret Intelligence. New York: Hyperion 2005.
  - Ray S. Cline, Secrets Spies and Scholars. Blueprint of the Essential CIA. Washington: Acropolis Books 1976.
  - Harold P. Ford, CIA and the Vietnam Policymakers: Three Episodes 1962–1968. Central Intelligence Agency 1998.
  - Victor Marchetti and John D. Marks, The CIA and the Cult of Intelligence. New York: Alfred A. Knopf 1974; reprint: Dell, NY 1980, 1989.
  - Ludwell Lee Montague, General Walter Bedell Smith as Director of Central Intelligence, October 1950–February 1953. Pennsylvania State University 1992).
  - Stansfield Turner, Secrecy and Democracy: The CIA in Transition. Boston: Houghton Mifflin 1985.
- H. Bradford Westerfield, editor, Inside the CIA's Private World: Declassified Articles from the Agency's Internal Journal, 1955–1992. Yale University 1995.

Senate/President

- Commission on CIA activities within the United States (Nelson A. Rockefeller, chair), Report to the President. Washington: U.S. Govt. Printing Office 1975.
- Senate Select Committee (Frank Church, chair), Alleged Assassination Plots involving Foreign Leaders, An Interim Report. Washington: U. S. Govt. Printing Office 1975.
- Senate Select Committee (Frank Church, chair), Final Report, Book I: Foreign and Military Intelligence. Washington: U. S. Govt. Printing Office 1976.
- Senate Select Committee (Frank Church, chair), Final Report, Book IV: Supplementary detailed Staff Reports on Foreign and Military Intelligence. Washington: U. S. Govt. Printing Office 1976.
  - Anne Karalekas, "History of the Central Intelligence Agency" in Senate (Church), Final Report, Book IV (1976) [Report 94-755] at v–vi, 1–107.

Commercial/Academic

- Rhodri Jeffreys-Jones, The CIA and American Democracy. Yale University 1989.
- Richard H. Immerman, The Hidden Hand: A Brief History of the CIA Chichester: Wiley Blackwell 2014.
- John Ranelagh, The Agency: The Rise and Decline of the CIA from Wild Bill Donovan to William Casey. Cambridge Pub. 1986; NY: Simon & Schuster 1986.
- Tim Weiner, Legacy of Ashes: The History of the CIA. New York: Doubleday 2007.
  - Edward Jay Epstein, Deception: The Invisible War between the KGB and the CIA. New York: Simon & Schuster 1989.
  - David C. Martin, A Wilderness of Mirros. New York: Harper and Row 1980.
  - Mark Mazzetti, The Way of the Knife: The CIA, a Secret Army, and a War at the Ends of the Earth. New York: Penguin 2013.
  - John Prados, William Colby and the CIA: The Secret Wars of a Controversial Spymaster University of Kansas 2003, 2009.
  - Bob Woodward, Veil: The Secret Wars of the CIA 1981–1987. New York: Simon and Schuster 1987; reprint: Pocket 1988.
- Athan Theoharis, editor, The Central Intelligence Agency. Security under Scrutiny. Westport: Greenwood Press 2006.
- Ralph E. Weber, editor, Spymasters. Ten CIA officers in Their Own Words. Wilmington: Scholarly Resources 1999.

=== Tertiary ===
- Christopher Andrew and Vasili Mitrokhin, The World Was Going Our Way. The KGB and the Battle for the Third World. Harmondsworth: Allen Lane 2005; NY: Basic Books 2005.
- Thomas Powers, Intelligence Wars: American Secret History from Hitler to Al-Qaeda. NY: New York Review Books 2002, rev. 2004.
- Dana Priest and William M. Arkin, Top Secret America: The Rise of the New American Security State. Boston: Little, Brown 2011.
- Jeffrey T. Richelson, A Century of Spies: Intelligence in the Twentieth Century. Oxford University 1995.
- Abram N. Shulsky and Gary J. Schmitt, Silent Warfare: Understanding the World of intelligence. Washington: Potomac Books 1991, [1993], 3d ed. 2002.

Government offices
Preceded by Richard M. Bissell Jr.	Deputy Director of Central Intelligence for Plans; 1962–1965	Succeeded by Desmond Fitzgerald
Preceded by Marshall Carter	Deputy Director of Central Intelligence; 1965–1966	Succeeded by Rufus Taylor
Preceded by William Raborn	Director of Central Intelligence; 1966–1973	Succeeded by James R. Schlesinger
Diplomatic posts
Preceded by Joseph S. Farland	United States Ambassador to Iran; 1973–1976	Succeeded by William H. Sullivan
