= Donald M. Weller =

U.S. Marine Corps Major General

Donald McPherrin Weller
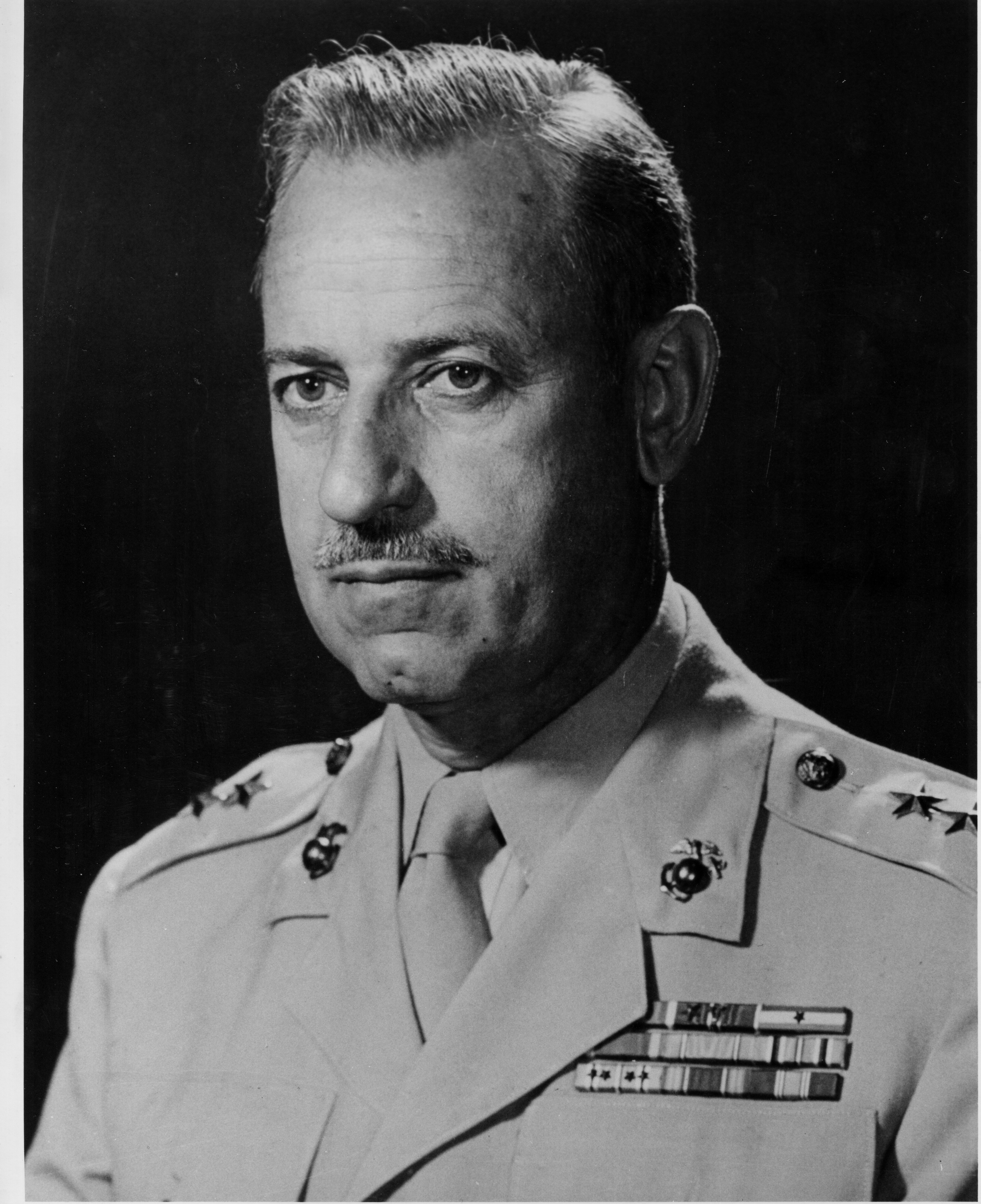
- MG Donald M. Weller, USMC
- Born: May 1, 1908; Hartford, Connecticut, U.S.
- Died: March 8, 1985 (aged 76); Joint Base Andrews, Maryland, U.S.
- Burial place: Arlington National Cemetery
- Military career
- Allegiance: United States of America
- Branch: United States Marine Corps
- Service years: 1930–1963
- Rank: Major general
- Nickname: "Don"
- Service number: 0-4550
- Commands: DepCom FMF, Pacific; 3rd Marine Division; 10th Marine Regiment
- Conflicts: Nicaraguan Campaign; Yangtze Patrol; World War II: Bougainville Campaign; Recapture of Guam; Battle of Iwo Jima
- Awards: Legion of Merit; Bronze Star Medal (2)

Donald McPherrin Weller (May 1, 1908 – March 8, 1985) was a decorated officer of the United States Marine Corps with the rank of major general. He is most noted as pioneer of Naval gunfire support and author of many publications on this topic. Weller also commanded 3rd Marine Division and ended his career as deputy commander, Fleet Marine Force Pacific.

== Early career ==
Donald M. Weller was born on May 1, 1908, in Hartford, Connecticut, as the son of a Methodist clergyman. He attended a grade school in East Greenwich, Rhode Island, and later high school in Pittsburgh, Pennsylvania. Following his graduation, he spent a year at Carnegie Tech, before he received appointment to the United States Naval Academy at Annapolis, Maryland, in June 1926. As a midshipman, he was an avid swimmer and saved the life of classmate in a boating accident in a stormy sea. In his final year at the academy, Weller shared a room with future Commandant of the Marine Corps, Wallace M. Greene.

After four years of studies, Weller successfully graduated on June 5, 1930, and was commissioned second lieutenant in the Marine Corps on the same date. He was subsequently ordered to the Basic School at Marine Corps Base Quantico, where he was taught the basics of being an "Officer of Marines". Following his graduation, he remained for some time at Quantico and also attended the Infantry Basic Course at local Marine Corps Schools for improvement of his knowledge of infantry tactics.

His first service assignment was with the Battery "A", 1st Battalion, 10th Marine Artillery Regiment with garrison at Quantico. The 1st Battalion was selected to participate in the ten-week training cruise aboard the battleship USS Arkansas in the Caribbean during January 1932.

Following his return from the exercise, Weller served for some time as Detachment Officer at Marine Barracks within Norfolk Navy Yard, before rejoined his 1st Battalion in January 1935. He was also promoted to the rank of first lieutenant during the same time.

A major breakthrough in his career occurred when he was sent to the Army Field Artillery School at Fort Sill, Oklahoma. Weller studied the application of Naval gunfire support during the amphibious assault through study of the Gallipoli Campaign while he prepared a term paper on the subject. He finished the Artillery School in July 1935 and returned to Battery "E" as an executive officer.

He continuously served with 10th Marines until June 1937, when he was appointed commander of the Marine detachment aboard the heavy cruiser USS Tuscaloosa. For his new task, he was also promoted to the rank of captain in August 1937. During his service on Tuscaloosa, he simultaneously served as Control Officer of the 5"/25 caliber Anti-aircraft battery and used this opportunity to improve his knowledge of use of naval gun for support of the landing operations.

== World War II ==
After two years of sea duties aboard the Tuscaloosa, Weller returned to the 1st Battalion, 10th Marines at Quantico Base, Virginia, in June 1939 and was appointed commanding officer of "A" Battery. He led his battery for the Fleet Exercise at Culebra, Puerto Rico, aboard the battleship USS Wyoming during the beginning of January 1940. His unit arrived back at Quantico during March 1940 and Weller himself remained with 1st Battalion until September 1940.

He was then transferred to the staff of 1st Marine Brigade under Brigadier General Holland Smith as Artillery and Naval Gunfire Advisor. Within this capacity, Weller took part in the extended Caribbean Maneuvers, in which 1st Brigade was transferred to Guantánamo Bay, Cuba to prevent expansion of Vichy French from Martinique.

Weller returned to the United States in March 1941 and following the activation of the Amphibious Corps, Atlantic Fleet again under General Smith, Weller was appointed to Smith's staff as assistant operations officer with specialization on the matters of Naval Gunfire. He received promotion to major in January 1942 and later to lieutenant colonel in August 1942. In this capacity, Weller was tasked again with the reorganization of the Naval Gunfire Shore Fire-Control Party, the link between the supporting ship and the troop unit ashore.

Lieutenant Colonel Weller received new orders in September 1942, when he was transferred to San Diego, California and appointed to the same capacity within Amphibious Corps, Pacific Fleet under Major General Clayton B. Vogel. His command was redesignated I Marine Amphibious Corps one month later and finally sailed overseas in December 1942. Weller was stationed on New Caledonia until he was transferred to 2nd Battalion, 12th Marine Artillery Regiment under Colonel John B. Wilson in January 1943.

The 75mm Howitzers of his battalion provided artillery support for the advancing units during the Battle of Piva Forks within Bougainville Campaign during November 1943. His battalion was assigned to the 3rd Marine Division under Major General Allen H. Turnage and Weller later received the Bronze Star Medal with Combat "V" and Navy Unit Commendation for his service on Bougainville.

He later led his battalion during the Recapture of Guam at the end of July 1944 and after he distinguished himself again, he received his second Bronze Star Medal with Combat "V" for his service there.

For his experiences in naval gun fire matters, Weller was transferred as Naval Gun Officer to the staff of Fleet Marine Force, Pacific under his old superior, General Holland Smith. While at Headquarters in Hawaii, Weller developed the shore bombardment training program for the Pacific Fleet and Marine units in the Pacific areas.

He participated in the planning and later took part in the Battle of Iwo Jima during spring 1945. Weller served simultaneously as naval gun officer for Task Force 51 under Vice Admiral Richmond K. Turner and had devised together with Lieutenant Colonel William W. Buchanan a modified form of the "rolling barrage" for use by the bombarding gunships against beachfront targets just before H-Hour. This concentration of naval gunfire would advance progressively as the troops landed, always remaining 400 yards to their front. Air spotters would help regulate the pace.

For his distinguished service with the Fleet Marine Force on Hawaii and during the Battle of Iwo Jima, Weller was decorated with the Legion of Merit with Combat "V" and received also the Navy Presidential Unit Citation.

== Postwar career ==
Upon his return to the United States in June 1945, Weller was appointed Chief of the Naval Gunfire Section within Troop Training Unit, Training Command, Amphibious Forces, Pacific Fleet at Coronado, California, under Brigadier General Harry K. Pickett.

He was subsequently assigned to the course at Army-Navy Staff College in Washington, D.C., and following the graduation, he was transferred to the Marine Corps Base Quantico, Virginia, to attend Instructor's Orientation Course at Marine Corps Schools located there. Weller finished all courses in June 1946 and for his experiences in Naval Gunfire, he began his three-year tour of duty as Chief of the Naval Gunfire Section, Marine Corps Schools, Quantico. While in this capacity, he was promoted to the rank of colonel in February 1948.

Weller left Quantico in July 1949 and entered Senior Course at the Naval War College in Newport, Rhode Island, one month later. He graduated in June 1950 and traveled to Washington, D.C., where he was appointed Chief, Strategic Planning Section within Division of Plans and Policies at Headquarters Marine Corps. He later switched to the capacity of Chief of Policy at Analysis Division, before he left for Camp Lejeune, North Carolina in July 1952.

While there, he succeeded Colonel Jack Tabor as commanding officer of 10th Marine Artillery Regiment, 2nd Marine Division. Weller served simultaneously as Division Artillery Officer under Major General Edwin A. Pollock. His division did not sail for Korean battlefield and he spent next months at Camp Lejeune. Weller was later promoted to the capacity of Division Chief of Staff in June 1953.

He was transferred to Quantico in August 1954 and appointed chief of staff, Marine Corps Schools. While in this capacity, Weller was responsible for the administration of the several educational facilities within Marine Corps Base Quantico. He was promoted to the rank of brigadier general in November 1955.

Another interesting assignment came at the end of May 1956, when Weller was transferred to Paris, France and appointed Deputy Operations Officer to the Commander in Chief, European Forces under General Lauris Norstad. He served in that capacity during the then-ongoing Revolution in Hungary in October 1956, but his command did not do anything.

Weller returned stateside during April 1958 and after a brief leave, he assumed duties as assistant chief of staff for personnel at Headquarters Marine Corps in Washington, D.C., under General Randolph M. Pate. While in this capacity, he was promoted to the rank of major general in July 1958.

General Weller was transferred to Okinawa, Japan, during August 1960 and assumed duties as commanding general, 3rd Marine Division. In this capacity, he succeeded his old comrade from his early service with 1st Battalion, 10th Marines, Major General Robert B. Luckey. Because of the ongoing Laotian Civil War and worsening situation in Vietnam, he was tasked with the training and combat preparation of the division for Counter-guerrilla operations.

He spent a year with service in the Far East, before finally left for Hawaii in September 1961, when he was appointed to his final assignment as deputy commander, Fleet Marine Force Pacific under Lieutenant General Alan Shapley.

== Civil life ==
He retired from the Marine Corps service after 33 years of commissioned service on August 1, 1963. Weller joined Institute for Defense Analyses, where he spent next nine years with work on addressing national security issues. He also attended London School of Economics and later served as consultant for the Naval Surface Weapons Center in Dahlgren, Virginia.

Weller also authored of several publications, including the widely known Naval Gunfire Support to Amphibious Operations: Past, Present, and Future. He later assumed the capacity of chairman, Marine Corps Heritage Foundation.

Major General Donald M. Weller died on March 8, 1985, at Malcolm Grow Medical Center and is buried at Arlington National Cemetery, Virginia, with his wife Frances Jordan Weller (1904–1990). They had one son, Donald M. Weller Jr., who also served in the Marine Corps and reached the rank of captain, and one daughter, Mary Calvert Brodbeck.

== Decorations ==
Here is the ribbon bar of Major General Donald M. Weller:

1st Row	Legion of Merit with Combat "V"			
2nd Row	Bronze Star Medal with one 5/16" gold star and Combat "V"	Navy Presidential Unit Citation with one star	Navy Unit Commendation	American Defense Service Medal with Fleet Clasp
3rd Row	American Campaign Medal	Asiatic-Pacific Campaign Medal with four 3/16 inch service stars	World War II Victory Medal	National Defense Service Medal with one star

Military offices
Preceded by Robert B. Luckey	Commanding General of the 3rd Marine Division; September 1, 1960 – September 1, 1961	Succeeded by Robert E. Cushman Jr.
Preceded by Jack Tabor	Commanding Officer of the 10th Marine Regiment; July 15, 1952 – June 5, 1953	Succeeded by Joe C. McHaney
