= Rufus Taylor =

American naval officer (1910–1978)

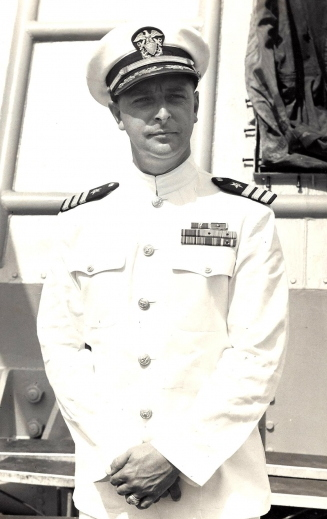
- Taylor as Commander of USS Noa in 1948

8th Deputy Director of Central Intelligence
- In office October 13, 1966 – February 1, 1969
- Appointed by: Lyndon B. Johnson
- Director: Richard Helms
- Preceded by: Richard Helms
- Succeeded by: Gen. Robert E. Cushman Jr.

Personal details
- Born: Rufus Lackland Taylor Jr. January 6, 1910 St. Louis, Missouri, U.S.
- Died: September 14, 1978 (aged 68) Whispering Pines, North Carolina, U.S.

Military service
- Allegiance: United States
- Branch/service: United States Navy
- Rank: Vice Admiral
- Commands: Office of Naval Intelligence
- Battles/wars: World War II

Rufus Lackland Taylor Jr. (January 6, 1910 – September 14, 1978) was an officer in the United States Navy. Eventually he became Director of the Office of Naval Intelligence and held the rank of Vice Admiral. In 1966 he was appointed as Deputy Director of the Defense Intelligence Agency (DIA), then shortly thereafter as Deputy Director of the CIA, where he served from 1966 to 1969.

== Career overview ==
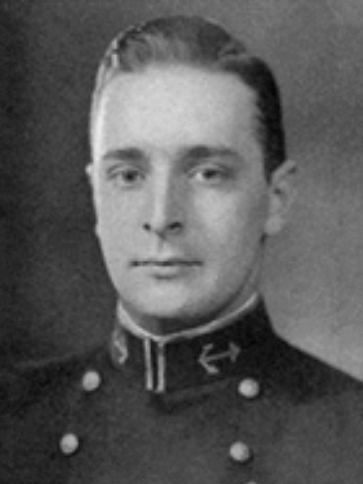
Rufus Taylor, U.S. Naval Academy Yearbook, c. 1933

Taylor was born in St. Louis, Missouri, and attended the Holderness School in Plymouth, New Hampshire, and Hall’s School in Columbia, Missouri. In August 1929 he enrolled in the United States Naval Academy, graduating in the Class of June 1933. While studying there he was active in baseball and association football. After graduating, he served on USS Arizona (1934–36) and USS Preston (1936–38). During World War II, he served in the Pacific. For the years 1963 to 1966 he was Director of the Office of Naval Intelligence (ONI). In June 1966, he was made Vice Admiral and Deputy Director of the Defense Intelligence Agency (DIA). That September President Lyndon Baines Johnson appointed him Deputy Director of Central Intelligence at CIA; he was quickly confirmed by the United States Senate. He served at CIA under DCI Richard Helms. Taylor later resigned as DDCI effective February 1969.

== In the Navy ==
Stationed in Japan from 1938 to 1941, he had been sent there by Naval Intelligence to study Japanese. In 1942 he was with an intelligence unit in Corregidor, when the Japanese invaded the Philippines. He was evacuated by motor boat and submarine to Australia. There he joined the staff of the Commander, Allied Naval Forces, Southwest Pacific. In 1943 he was sent to Washington, D.C., to the Office of Naval Intelligence (ONI). Then in Hawaii, he was with Fleet Radio Unit Pacific (FRUPAC), working to decipher enemy naval codes, until the Japanese surrender. He returned to Japan with occupation forces. He then served at sea until 1953. Back in Washington, he was sent to the National Security Agency (NSA). He was then given various assignments in intelligence. In Washington in 1959, he became chief of Pacific Intelligence. In 1963 he was promoted to Director, ONI.

Taylor directed Naval Intelligence until 1966. Among other things, in 1965 he initiated the set up of a secret HUMINT capacity for the Navy. "Despite some concern by senior Navy officers about the 'flap potential', the proposal was approved" by Paul Nitze, the Secretary of the Navy. Established in 1966, the covert unit was designated the Naval Field Operations Support Group (NFOSG) – more commonly known as 'Task Force 157'.

== At CIA ==
The Deputy Director (DDCI) was second in command to the Director of Central Intelligence (DCI), then the top intelligence officer. In the absence of the DCI the DDCI assumes the Director's responsibilities. Below are several rulings made by Taylor which addressed high-level disputes within the Agency.

=== Yuri Nosenko ===
In late 1967, DCI Richard Helms asked Taylor to oversee a difficult, intra-CIA dispute involving Yuri Nosenko, who had defected from Soviet intelligence in 1964. CIA counterintelligence chief James Angleton had almost immediately accused Nosenko of being a double agent and provocateur sent by the Soviets to penetrate American intelligence. As a result of this dilemma Nosenko was held for several years by CIA pending resolution. Taylor conducted his "independent review" of the "immense files" and began to interview the CIA officers involved. Finally Taylor concluded that Nosenko was not a double agent and that Helms should set him free.

In his exhaustive review Taylor also had relied on an internal CIA report by Bruce Solie of October 1968. Despite strong objections from CIA counterintelligence, in March 1969 Nosenko was released and put on the CIA payroll as a consultant. Angleton, however, kept insisting Nosenko was a counterspy, until in 1974 Angleton resigned from CIA. A further internal CIA report by John Hart in late 1976 confirmed Nosenko's bona fides.

Spy Wars, a 2007 book by a former CIA officer, follows the view of Angleton. It presents the case that Yuri Nosenko was a Soviet counterspy.

=== Sam Adams ===
In May 1968, DCI Helms had appointed three top CIA officials to a special review board, which was given the case of Sam Adams, a mid-level analyst at CIA. The board was chaired by Taylor and included CIA general counsel, Lawrence Houston, and OSS and CIA veteran John Bross, assistant to the DCI. It was "as high level a [board] as could be found within the agency."

Adams in 1966 had challenged the prevailing view of the number of Viet Cong guerrillas, known as the Order of Battle controversy. The Army's MACV had lower numbers and forcefully asserted its position. These lower numbers were attacked as being the result of a politically motivated effort to present the American war effort in a more positive light. The conflict between the Army officers in the field and CIA analysts in Washington had become a serious concern for the intelligence community. By statute DCI Helms had to arbitrate the dispute. Taking into consideration the prevailing political views of the Johnson Administration, and of the military leaders, in late 1967 Helms finessed it. Adams cried foul at the compromise which favored the lower MACV numbers, and filed a formal complaint against Helms.

By August 1, 1968, the special review board determined that, although Adams' numbers were probably more accurate, his methodology could not provide certainty. While Adams himself had followed correct CIA procedure regarding his complaint, the CIA also had given him a fair opportunity to present his case. The board recommended another opportunity be granted Adams: a presentation to General Maxwell Taylor chairman of the PFIAB. That November Adams discussed the situation in person with Helms. Never fully reconciled to Helms' policy stance, Adams resigned from the Agency in 1973.

Nota Bene: Adams starts his memoirs by referring to "a letter from Admiral Rufus Taylor, the agency's otherwise kindly deputy director, who intimated that the CIA would be better off without me." As Adams recalls, "The letter was Admiral Taylor's last official act" at CIA, on January 31, 1969. The letter ends suggesting that Adams "submit [his] resignation." Adams instead reflected on troubles at CIA, and "the damnedest set of misdeeds that U.S. Intelligence had ever strung together," e.g., the Order of Battle controversy. "Despite his letter I had no intentions of quitting. Instead I removed from my desk a manilla folder of classified documents... walked past the guard... and drove home." Adams buried these and other documents, afraid they "might vanish" at CIA. They later supported the controversial 1982 CBS documentary The Uncounted Enemy and then were produced for the 1984–1985 trial Westmoreland v. CBS.

== Legacy ==
The Vice Admiral Rufus L. Taylor Award "is presented annually by the National Military Intelligence Association and the National Military Intelligence Foundation to the active duty Naval Intelligence professional whose contributions to the Navy best exemplify the dedication to duty and the unique accomplishments of Vice Adm. Taylor."

Taylor "made naval history as a superb manager and signals intelligence analyst. He played a leading role in the analysis of Japanese codes in World War II. His efforts provided critical intelligence to naval commanders which contributed significantly to the Allied victory."

== Personal life ==
Taylor was the son of Rufus Lackland Taylor Sr. and Caroline Newman Taylor. His older brother Edmond Lapierre Taylor (February 13, 1908 – March 30, 1998) was a journalist and writer.

Between September 1938 and September 1941 Taylor was assigned to the American Embassy in Tokyo. There, on September 20, 1940, he married Karin Margareta Gerdts, a Swedish citizen born in Yokohama on May 12, 1914. The couple had a son, two daughters, and three grandchildren. Their son Rufus Lackland Taylor III is a 1966 graduate of the U.S. Naval Academy. Karin Taylor died at age 98 on December 6, 2012 in North Carolina.

== See also ==
- Deputy Director of the Central Intelligence Agency
- Office of Naval Intelligence
