= Thomas Powers =

American author and intelligence expert (born 1940)

Thomas Powers (born December 12, 1940, in New York City) is an American author and intelligence expert.

He was awarded the Pulitzer Prize for National Reporting in 1971 together with Lucinda Franks for his articles on Weatherman member Diana Oughton (1942-1970). He was also the recipient of the Olive Branch award in 1984 for a cover story on the Cold War that appeared in The Atlantic, a 2007 Berlin Prize, and the Los Angeles Times Book Prize for History for his 2010 book on Crazy Horse.

== Life and works ==
Born in New York City in 1940, Powers attended Tabor Academy in Marion, Massachusetts, graduating in 1958. He later attended Yale University, where he graduated in 1964 with a degree in English. At first, he worked for the Rome Daily American in Italy and later for United Press International. In 1970, he became a freelance writer.

Powers is the author of six works of non-fiction and one novel. The Man Who Kept Secrets: Richard Helms and the CIA, his 1979 biography of former Director of Central Intelligence Richard Helms, is "widely regarded as one of the best books ever written on the subject of intelligence." His work on Werner Heisenberg tracks secret developments in nuclear physics during the 1930s and early 1940s.

The revised edition of his Intelligence Wars contains twenty-eight articles previously published in The New York Review of Books and The New York Times Book Review from 1983 to 2004. His most recent book follows the life of Lakota war leader Crazy Horse. Evan Thomas, while reviewing the book in The New York Times, commented broadly on Powers' work:

Powers is "a great journalistic anthropologist. In possibly the best book ever written about the C.I.A, The Man Who Kept the Secrets, Powers took the reader on a fascinating journey into the world of secret intelligence gathering and covert action. The C.I.A. was, at least in the early years of the cold war, a tribe as mysterious and exotic as the Great Plains Sioux of the 1870s. And Powers tells us much that is revealing and often moving about the Sioux in their last days as free warriors".

Powers has been a contributor to The New York Review of Books, The Atlantic, the Los Angeles Times, The New York Times Book Review, Harper's Magazine, The Nation, Commonweal, and Rolling Stone.

Besides writing, Powers joined a partnership to found a publishing company, Steerforth Press, in 1994. Originally headquartered in South Royalton, Vermont, it is now located in Hanover, New Hampshire. Its website describes itself as a "small independent house" with a "range of titles on a variety of topics".

Powers and his wife Candace live in Vermont.

== Bibliography ==
- Diana: The Making of a Terrorist, Houghton Mifflin, 1971, ISBN 978-0-395-12375-1
- The War at Home, Grossman, 1973
- The Man Who Kept the Secrets: Richard Helms and the CIA, Knopf, 1979, ISBN 978-0-394-50777-4
- Thinking About the Next War, Knopf, 1982, ISBN 978-0-394-52831-1
- Heisenberg's War: The Secret History of the German Bomb. Knopf. 1993. ISBN 978-0-394-51411-6.
- The Confirmation, Knopf, 2000, ISBN 978-0-375-40020-9, a novel
- Intelligence Wars: American Secret History from Hitler to Al-Qaeda. New York Review Books. 2002. ISBN 978-1-59017-023-6.
  - revised and expanded edition, 2004.
- The Military Error: Baghdad and Beyond in America's War of Choice. New York Review of Books. 2008. ISBN 978-1-59017-299-5.
- The Killing of Crazy Horse. Random House, Inc. 2010. ISBN 978-0-375-41446-6.
- "Getting Sacagawea Right" (review of Our Story of Eagle Woman: Sacagawea: They Got It Wrong, by the Sacagawea Project Board of the Mandan, Hidatsa, and Arikara Nation, Paragon Agency, 2021, 342 pp.), The New York Review of Books, vol. LXX, no. 10 (8 June 2023), pp. 39–42.
