= Elaine O'Beirne-Ranelagh =

American writer and folklorist

- Born: Elaine Lambert Lewis; 6 July 1914; Brooklyn, New York
- Died: 5 April 1996 (aged 81); London, UK

Elaine O'Beirne-Ranelagh (6 July 1914 – 5 April 1996) was an American writer and folklorist, who also published under the pseudonym Anne O'Neill Barna.

== Early life and education ==
Elaine O'Beirne-Ranelagh was born in Brooklyn, New York on 6 July 1914. She was the only child of Josephine Lambert Lewis and Harry M. Lewis. She attended Vassar College, studying the classics and majoring in Greek. It was an interest in mythology that led to her becoming interested in folklore, and after Vassar she went on to study folklore at postgraduate level at the Indiana University. She won the Guggenheim Fellowship in 1935, and in 1936 went to Rome to study Italian fairy tales. A Guggenheim chaperone warned her that Mussolini would make passes that the fellowship girls, but her memory was of Mussolini as a squat man in black attracting all of the attention.

Upon her return to the United States, O'Beirne-Ranelagh immersed herself in the study of African-American spirituals and slave music, making pioneering broadcasts of such music on station WNYC with her programme Folksongs for the seven million. Through this she brought the music of Lead Belly to a broader audience, appearing regularly on her radio programme. Towards the end of World War II she met James O'Beirne at Columbia University Library, meeting to record his repertoire of Irish songs. He had fought in the 1916 Easter Rising with The O'Rahilly, and later with the Cork No. 1 Brigade during the War of Independence. Following a period of internment, he had traveled to the United States in 1923 to complete the engineering degree he had started at University College Cork.

== Career ==
The couple married in July 1946, in Rathnew, County Wicklow. The changing of their name from O'Beirne to O'Beirne-Ranelagh is often ascribed to her, but it was inspired by James' interest in the Irish literary revival and the "Celtic twilight". The couple had four children, John, Bawn, Elizabeth, and Fionn. She described the decade after her marriage, living in rural Ireland, in her book Himself and I. The book chronicled her move from New York city to rural County Kildare, where she lived with no electricity and running water. She came to understand that in Ireland the "good old days" was synonymous with illiteracy, Jansenism, and the oppression of women. Following the publication of the book in New York in 1957 there was staunch criticism in Ireland of its portrayal of the Catholic Church's control of Irish education, birth control, censorship, along with the sexual immaturity of the Irish people. She published the book under the pseudonym Anne O'Neill Barna for legal reasons, though her identity was widely known in Dublin. The book was banned from sale in Ireland.

O'Beirne-Ranelagh continued to collect ballads and folklore in Ireland, made some broadcasts for Radio Éireann, and served on the Irish Fulbright commission. By the late 1950s her husband's farming and business ventures were failing, and in 1959 she moved to Cambridge with her children to take up a position as educational director for the University of Maryland. The university was among the first to establish a campus in Europe after World War II, and had a contract to run university courses for those stationed US Air Force bases in East Anglia. James remained in Ireland, and from this point they lived separate lives. They never divorced, and when James was suffering with terminal cancer, he lived his last months with her and the children in Cambridge. He died there in May 1979.

For the next 25 years she worked for the University of Maryland in East Anglia, but she also resumed her folklore research. This work culminated in two major academic works: The past we share (1979), which dealt with how much western culture owed to the Arab world, and Men on women (1985), which focused on the how certain male attitudes to women have persisted throughout history and was a prescient feminist text. She also drew on her study to write lighter fare, a series of books on jokes starting in 1987 with Rugby jokes, Son of rugby jokes and Hands up for rugby jokes' (1988), Rugby jokes in the office (1989), Rugby jokes score again and Even more rugby jokes (1990), and More rugby jokes (1992). She had no interest in rugby but instead treated the subject with the same dedication she had to other forms of folklore she studied with due academic rigour. She also wrote one romantic novel, Wentworth Hall, published in 1974.

O'Beirne Ranelagh died in London on 5 April 1996.
