= Robert E. Cushman Jr. =

US Marine Corps general and CIA Deputy Director

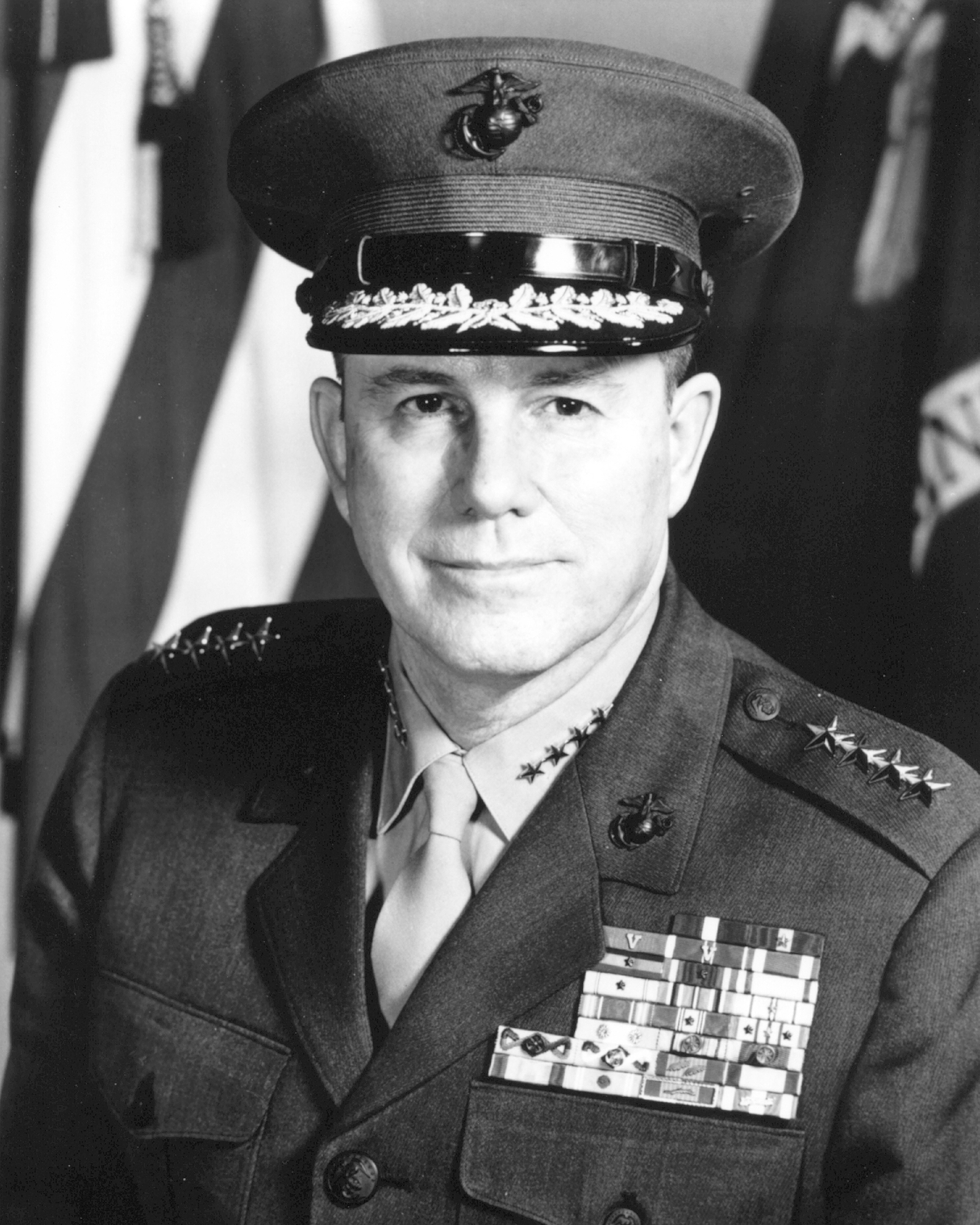
- General Robert E. Cushman Jr.

9th Deputy Director of Central Intelligence
- In office May 7, 1969 – December 31, 1971
- President: Richard Nixon
- Director: Richard Helms
- Preceded by: Rufus Taylor
- Succeeded by: Vernon A. Walters

Personal details
- Born: December 24, 1914 St. Paul, Minnesota, U.S.
- Died: January 2, 1985 (aged 70) Fort Washington, Maryland, U.S.
- Resting place: Arlington National Cemetery

Military service
- Allegiance: United States
- Branch/service: United States Marine Corps
- Years of service: 1935–1975
- Rank: General
- Commands: Commandant of the Marine Corps; III Marine Amphibious Force; 5th Marine Division; 4th Marine Division; Marine Corps Base Camp Pendleton; 3rd Marine Division; 2nd Marine Regiment; 2nd Battalion, 9th Marines
- Battles/wars: World War II: Attack on Pearl Harbor; Battle of Guam; Battle of Bougainville; Battle of Iwo Jima; Vietnam War
- Awards: Navy Cross; Navy Distinguished Service Medal (4); Legion of Merit; Bronze Star Medal

Robert Everton Cushman Jr. (December 24, 1914 – January 2, 1985) was a United States Marine Corps four-star general who served as the 25th commandant of the Marine Corps from January 1, 1972, to June 30, 1975. He was honored for heroism during World War II at the battles of Guam (Navy Cross), Bougainville (Bronze Star Medal) and Iwo Jima (Legion of Merit). He also commanded all Marine forces in the Vietnam War from June to December 1967, and served as deputy director of the Central Intelligence Agency (CIA) from 1969 to 1971.

== Early life ==
Cushman was born December 24, 1914, in St. Paul, Minnesota, the son of Jennie Lind (née Cumley) and Robert Everton Cushman. He attended Central High School and at sixteen, before graduating, was appointed to the United States Naval Academy. Cushman graduated tenth in his class of 442 from the academy.

== Marines career ==
=== Early career ===
Cushman was commissioned a second lieutenant in the United States Marine Corps on June 6, 1935. He completed the Basic School for Marine officers at the Philadelphia Navy Yard, then served briefly at the Marine Corps Base, San Diego, California. In February 1936, he arrived in Shanghai, China, and served as a platoon commander with the 4th Marines and later the 2nd Marine Brigade. On his return to the United States in March 1938, he served at naval shipyards in Brooklyn, New York, and Portsmouth, Virginia. He was promoted to first lieutenant in August 1938.

In April 1939, Cushman was assigned to the Marine detachment at the New York World's Fair, and was subsequently stationed at the Marine Barracks, Quantico, Virginia. He was promoted to captain in March 1941.

=== World War II ===
In June 1941, Cushman reported aboard USS Pennsylvania in San Diego, en route to Pearl Harbor, as commanding officer of the ship's Marine detachment. He was serving in this capacity when the Japanese attacked the ship and other naval installations at Pearl Harbor on December 7, 1941. Upon his transfer from the Pennsylvania, he joined the 9th Marine Regiment at San Diego as a battalion executive officer in May 1942 and was promoted to major that same month.

Cushman hiked from San Diego to Camp Pendleton with his unit in September 1942, and embarked for the Pacific Area in January 1943. That month, Cushman was appointed commanding officer of the 2nd Battalion, 9th Marines, and in May 1943 was promoted to lieutenant colonel. During the two years he held that post, he led his battalion repeatedly into combat, earning the Bronze Star Medal with Combat "V" on Bougainville, the Navy Cross during the Battle of Guam, and the Legion of Merit with Combat "V" during the Battle of Iwo Jima, where two of his companies were nearly wiped out (10 survivors – 3 from F Company, and 7 from E Company) when they were trapped in a defilade later called "Cushman's Pocket."

=== Post war years ===
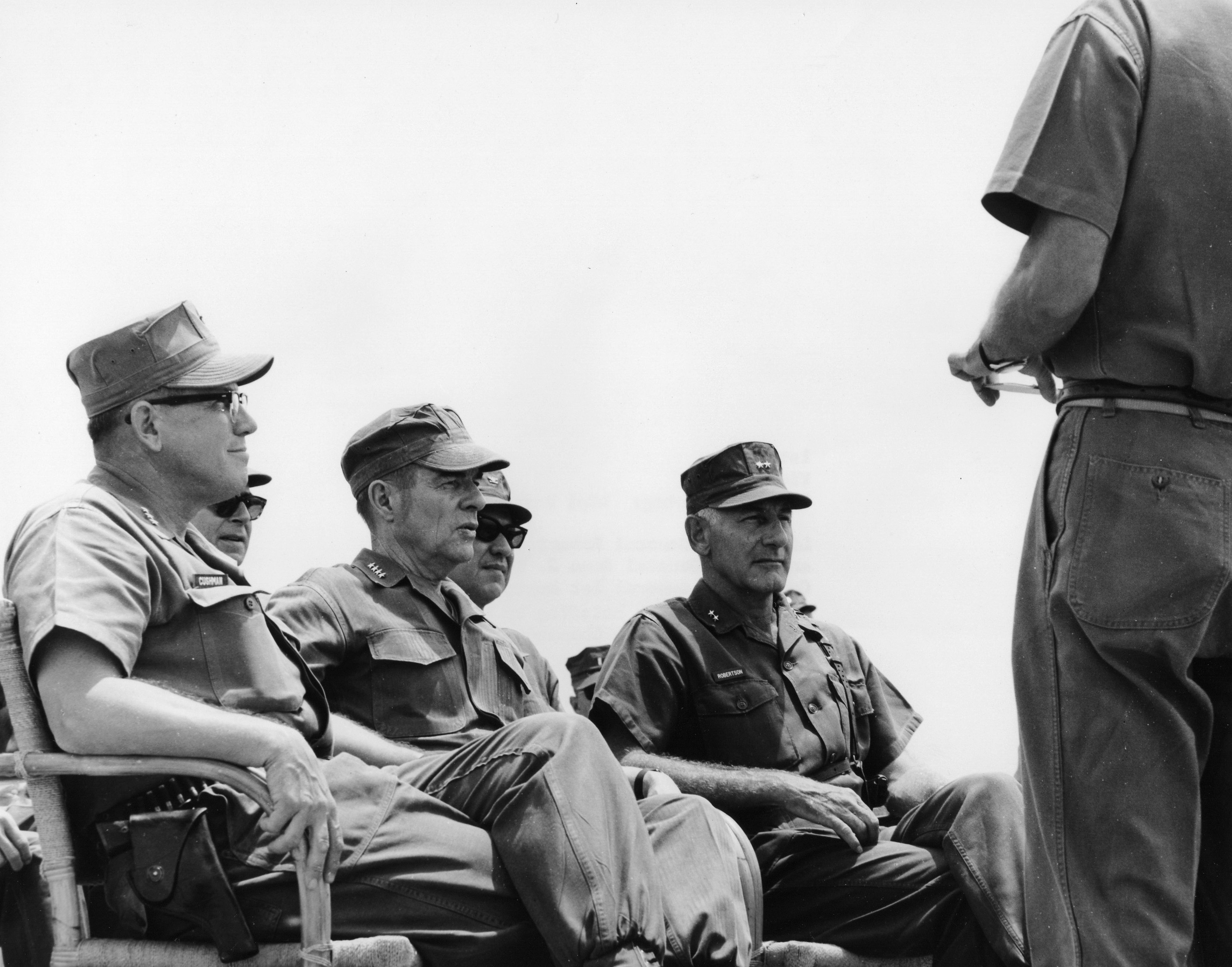
Lieutenant General Robert E. Cushman, Jr. with General Wallace M. Greene and Major General Donn J. Robertson listening to map briefing by Lieutenant Colonel John D. Counselman, Commanding Officer 3rd Battalion, 7th Marines, Da Nang, 1967.

Upon his return to the United States in May 1945, Cushman was stationed at Marine Corps Schools, Quantico, for three years. During that period he completed the Senior School, served as an instructor in the Command and Staff School, and during the latter two years was supervisory instructor, Amphibious Warfare School. In June 1948, he was named head of the Amphibious Warfare Branch, Office of Naval Research, Navy Department, Washington, D.C. From October 1949 until May 1951, he served on the staff of the Central Intelligence Agency (CIA). While there, he was promoted to colonel in May 1950.

In June 1951, Cushman joined the staff of the commander-in-chief, United States Naval Forces, Eastern Atlantic and Mediterranean Fleet, in London, serving as amphibious plans officer until June 1953. Following his return to the United States, he was transferred to Norfolk, Virginia, where he served as a member of the faculty of the Armed Forces Staff College, and in July 1954 became director of the Plans and Operations Division there. In July 1956, he assumed command of the 2nd Marine Regiment at Camp Lejeune, North Carolina.

Assigned to Washington, D.C., in February 1957, Cushman served four years on the staff of then-vice president Richard Nixon as assistant to the vice president for National Security Affairs. While serving in this capacity he was promoted to brigadier general in July 1958.

Following his departure from Washington, Cushman became assistant division commander, 3rd Marine Division, on Okinawa in March 1961. He was promoted to major general in August 1961, and in September assumed command of the division, when he relieved Major General Donald M. Weller.

In July 1962, Cushman reported to Headquarters Marine Corps (HQMC) in Washington, D.C., where he was assigned as both assistant chief of staff, G-2 (Intelligence) and assistant chief of staff, G-3 (Plans, Operations and Training), in which capacities he served until January 1, 1964. From that date until June 1964, he served only as assistant chief of staff, G-3.

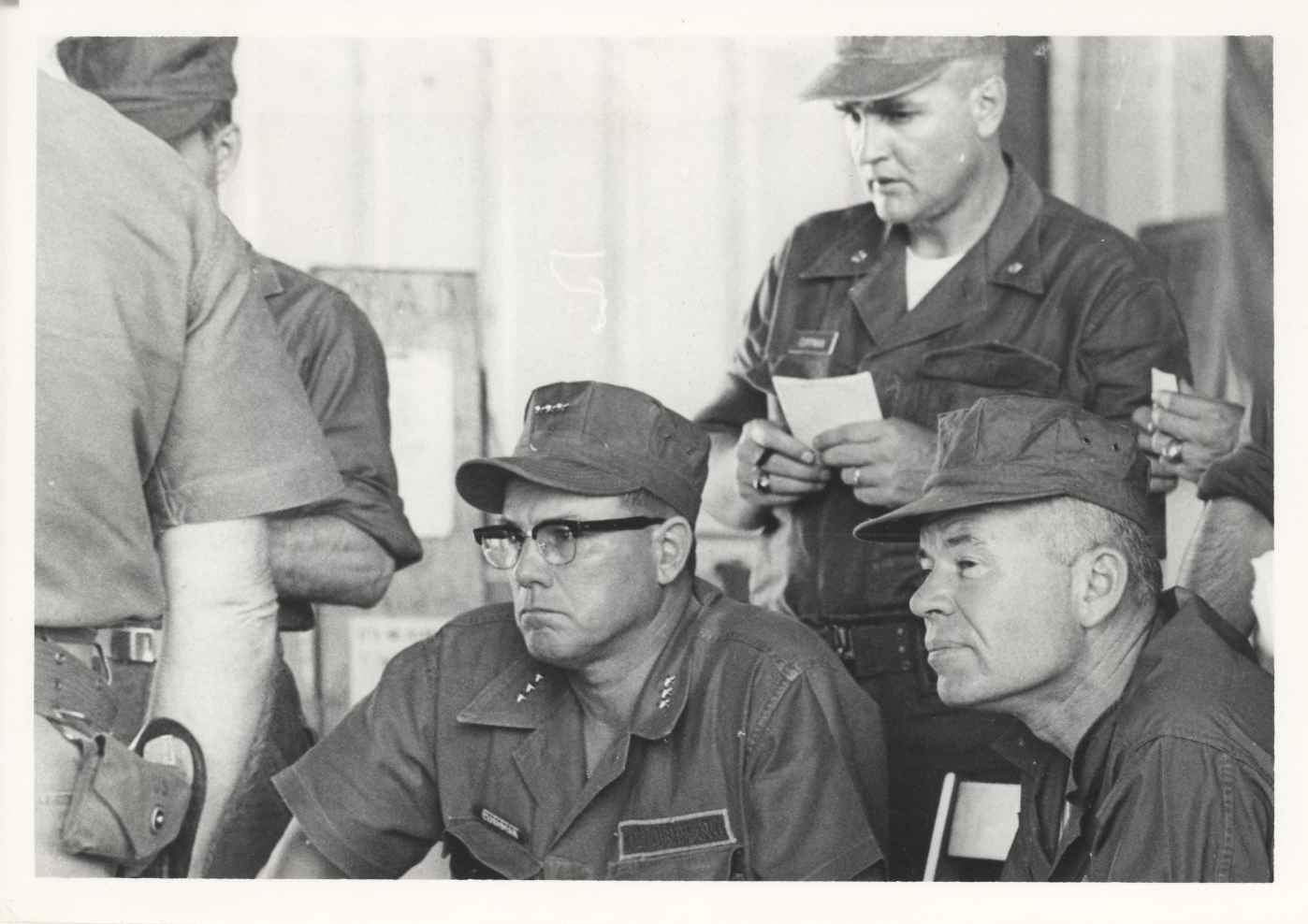
Lieutenant General Robert Cushman, Jr. and the Honorable Charles Baird (Under Secretary of the Navy) in briefing about Marine Aircraft Group 12 (1967)

From June 1964 until March 1967, Cushman served in the dual capacity of commanding general, Marine Corps Base Camp Pendleton, California, and commanding general, 4th Marine Division Headquarters Nucleus. In June 1966, he formed the 5th Marine Division, and additionally, he served as its commanding general at Camp Pendleton until November 1966.

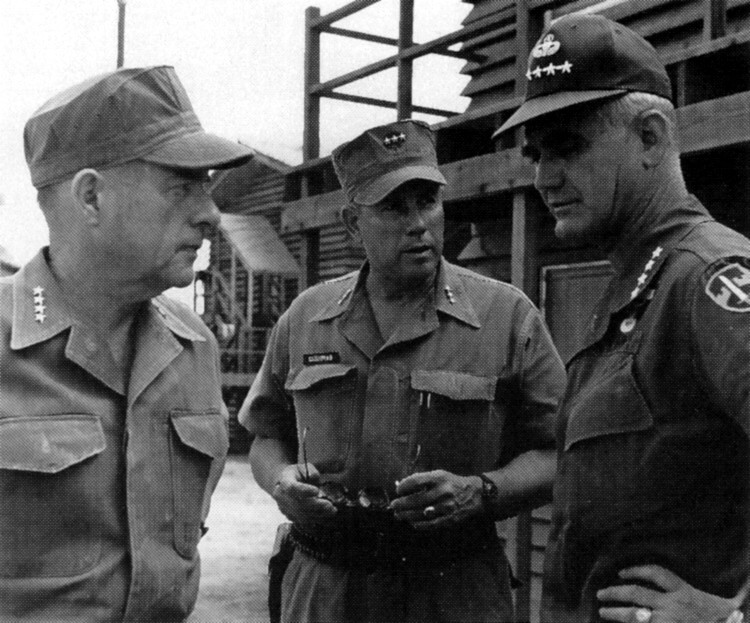
Lieutenant General Cushman as Commanding General III MAF in the centre with Commandant Wallace M. Greene (left) and General William C. Westmoreland, Commanding general of MACV in Vietnam, 1967.

=== Vietnam War ===
Cushman was ordered to South Vietnam in April 1967 and was assigned as the deputy commander, III Marine Amphibious Force (III MAF). Upon assuming duty as commanding general, III MAF, the largest combined combat unit ever led by a Marine, he was promoted to lieutenant general in June 1967. For his service as deputy commander, from April to May 1967, and subsequently as commanding general, III MAF, from June to December 1967, he was awarded the Navy Distinguished Service Medal. A Gold Star in lieu of a second Distinguished Service Medal was awarded for his service as commanding general, III MAF; senior advisor, I Corps Tactical Zone; and I Corps coordinator for United States/Free World Military Assistance Forces, from January 1968 to March 1969.

=== Senior and command appointments ===
On March 6, 1969, while serving in Vietnam, Cushman was nominated by President Richard Nixon to be the deputy director of the Central Intelligence Agency (CIA); the Senate confirmed his nomination on April 21, 1969. Upon his return to the United States, he served briefly as director of personnel/deputy chief of staff (manpower) at HQMC. Cushman subsequently served as deputy director of the CIA from April 1969 through December 1971, for which service he was awarded the Distinguished Intelligence Medal.

Cushman was promoted to general and assumed the office of Commandant of the Marine Corps on January 1, 1972. During Cushman's tenure, he saw the last of the Marines leave Vietnam and the peacetime strength fall to 194,000 while still maintaining readiness to act in such emergencies as the Mayaguez incident and the evacuations of Phnom Penh and Saigon.

== Later life ==
Cushman died January 2, 1985, at his home in Fort Washington, Maryland. He is buried in Arlington National Cemetery.

== Awards ==
Cushman's medals and decorations include:

1st Row		Navy Cross	Navy Distinguished Service Medal w/ 3 award stars	
2nd Row	Legion of Merit w/ valor device	Bronze Star Medal w/ valor device	Navy and Marine Corps Commendation Medal	Navy Presidential Unit Citation w/ 1 star
3rd Row	Navy Unit Commendation w/ 1 star	Distinguished Intelligence Medal	China Service Medal	American Defense Service Medal w/ 1 star
4th Row	American Campaign Medal	Asiatic-Pacific Campaign Medal w/ 5 stars	World War II Victory Medal	National Defense Service Medal w/ 1 star
5th Row	Vietnam Service Medal w/ 7 stars	Order of May to the Naval Merit, Commander (Argentina)	National Order of Vietnam, Commander	National Order of Vietnam, Officer
6th Row	Vietnam Army Distinguished Service Order, 1st Class	Vietnam Navy Distinguished Service Order, 1st Class	Vietnam Gallantry Cross w/ 2 palms	Order of Military Merit, Eulji Cordon Medal
7th Row	Order of Military Merit, Chungmu Cordon Medal	Order of National Security Merit, Sam-il Medal	Vietnam Gallantry Cross unit citation	Vietnam Campaign Medal

=== Navy Cross citation ===
Citation:

The President of the United States of America takes pleasure in presenting the Navy Cross to Lieutenant Colonel Robert Everton Cushman, Jr. (MCSN: 0-5062), United States Marine Corps, for extraordinary heroism as Commanding Officer of the Second Battalion, Ninth Marines, THIRD Marine Division, in action against enemy Japanese forces on Guam, Marianas Islands, from 21 July to 20 August 1944. When his Battalion was ordered to seize and hold a strongly organized and defended enemy strong point which had been holding up the advance for some days on 25 July, Lieutenant Colonel Cushman directed the attacks of his Battalion and the repulse of numerous Japanese counterattacks, fearlessly exposing himself to heavy hostile rifle, machine-gun and mortar fire in order to remain in the front lines and obtain first-hand knowledge of the enemy situation. Following three days of bitter fighting culminating in a heavy Japanese counterattack which pushed back the flank of his Battalion on 28 July, he personally led a platoon into the gap and, placing it for defense, repelled the hostile force. By his inspiring leadership, courage and devotion to duty, he contributed materially to the success of the mission with the annihilation of one enemy Battalion and the rout of another, thereby upholding the highest traditions of the United States Naval Service.

== In popular culture ==
Cushman was portrayed by Roy Barnitt in the film Nixon in an uncredited appearance.

== Notes ==
Government offices
Preceded by Rufus L. Taylor	Deputy Director of Central Intelligence; 1969–1971	Succeeded by Vernon A. Walters
Military offices
Preceded by Leonard F. Chapman Jr.	Commandant of the Marine Corps; 1972–1975	Succeeded by Louis H. Wilson Jr.
Preceded by Unit reactivated	Commanding General of the 5th Marine Division; March–October 1966	Succeeded by Lewis J. Fields
Preceded by Donald M. Weller	Commanding General of the 1st Marine Division; 1961–1962	Succeeded by Henry W. Buse Jr.
