= John Ranelagh =

Irish historian

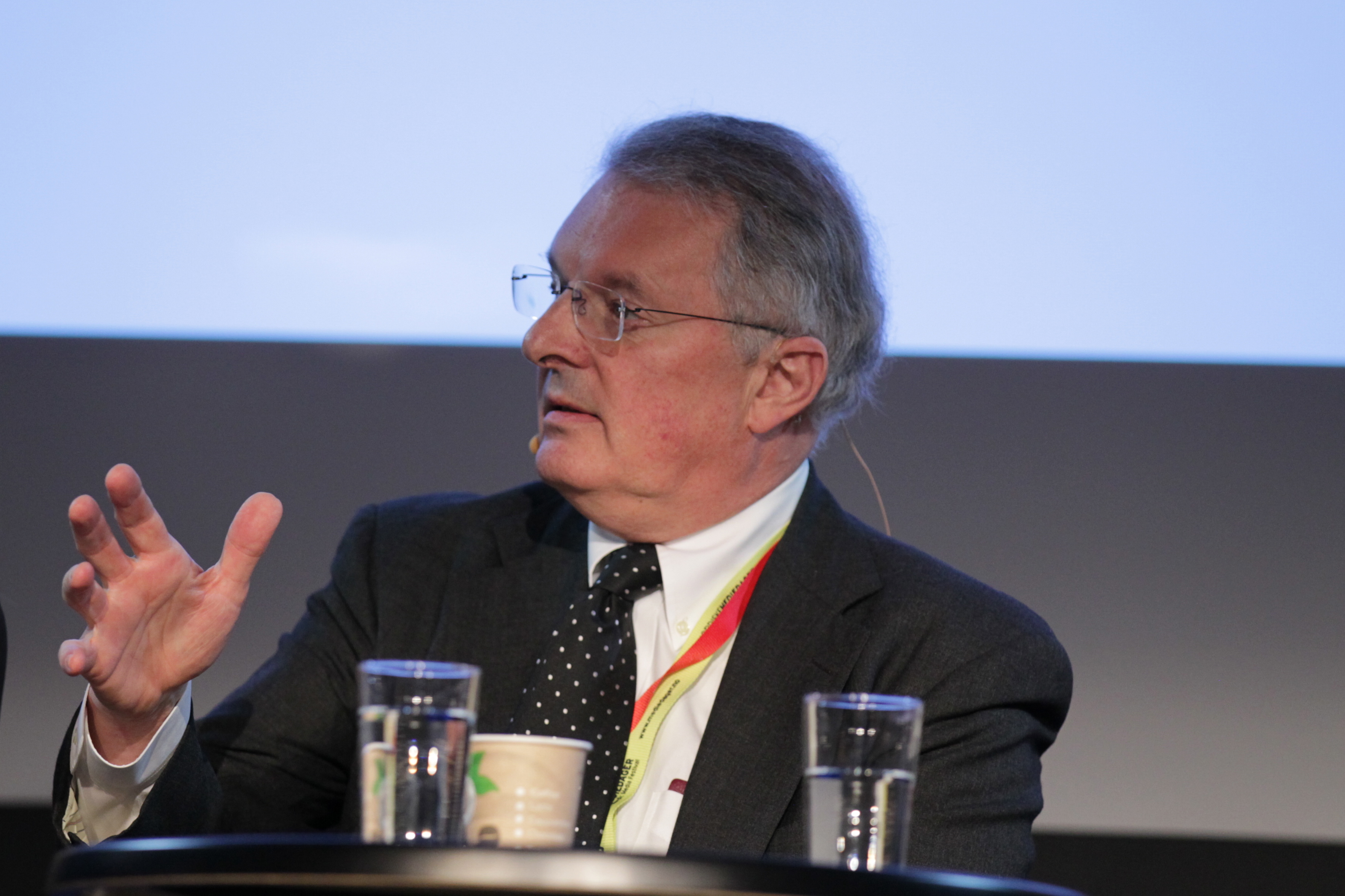
John Ranelagh, 2013

John O'Beirne Ranelagh is a television executive and producer, and an author of history and of current politics. He was created a Knight First Class by King Harald V of Norway in 2013 in the Royal Norwegian Order of Merit, for outstanding service in the interest of Norway.

Ranelagh was born in New York and moved to rural Ireland following his parents’ 1946 marriage.

== Education ==
He read Modern History at Christ Church, Oxford, and went on to take a Ph.D. at Eliot College, University of Kent.

== Career ==
He was Campaign Director for "Outset", a charity for the single homeless person, where he pioneered the concept of charity auctions. From 1974 to 1979 he was at the Conservative Research Department where he first had responsibility for Education policy, and then for Foreign policy. He started his career in television with the British Broadcasting Corporation, first for BBC News and Current Affairs on Midweek. As Associate Producer he was a key member of the BBC/RTE Ireland: A Television History 13-part documentary series (1981). Later a member of the team that started Channel 4, he conceived the Equinox program, developed the "commissioning system", and served as Board Secretary. He was the first television professional appointed to the Independent Television Commission (ITC), a government agency which licensed and regulated commercial television in Britain from 1991 to 2003.

Eventually Ranelagh relocated to Scandinavia where he continued in television broadcasting. There he has been with various companies: as Executive Chairman for NordicWorld; as Director for Kanal 2 Estonia; and, as Deputy Chief Executive and Director of Programmes for TV2 Denmark. Later Ranelagh worked at TV2 Norway as Director of Acquisition, and at Vizrt as deputy Chairman and then Chairman .

Ranelagh stood as the Conservative Party candidate in Caerphilly in the 1979 general election. He stood for the seat of Bethnal Green and Bow in the 1977 Greater London Council election.

== Books ==
Ranelagh has also written several books:

- "The I.R.B. from the Treaty to 1924," in Irish Historical Studies, Vol. 20, No. 77 (March 1976). (a New Statesman Book of the Year; a New Yorker Book if Interest)
- "Science and Education," CRD, 1977.
- "Human Rights and Foreign Policy," with Richard Luce, CPC, 1978.
- Ireland. An illustrated history (Oxford University 1981);
- A Short History of Ireland (Cambridge University 1983, 2d ed. 1995, 3d ed. 2012);
- The Agency. The rise and decline of the CIA (New York: Simon and Schuster 1986, pb. ed. 1987); (a New York Times Notable Book; winner of the National Intelligence Book Prize)
- "Secrets, Supervision and Information," in Freedom of Information; Freedom of the Individual, ed. Julia Neuberger, 1987.
- "The Irish Republican Brotherhood in the revolutionary period, 1879–1923," in The Revolution in Ireland, 1879–1923, ed. D.G. Boyce, 1988.
- Den Anden Kanal, Tiderne Skifter, 1989.
- Thatcher's People. An insider's account of the politics, the power and the personalities (HarperCollins 1991);
- CIA: A History (London: BBC Books, illustrated edition 1992). (a Financial Times Book of the Year)
- Encyclopædia Britannica, "Ireland," 1993–
- "Through the Looking Glass: A comparison of United States and United Kingdom Intelligence cultures," in In the Name of Intelligence, eds. Hayden B. Peake and Samuel Halpern, 1998.
- "Channel 4: A view from within," in The making of Channel 4, ed. Peter Catterall, 1998.

== Family ==
John Ranelagh's Irish father was James O'Beirne Ranelagh (died 1979 Cambridge) who had been in the IRA in 1916 and later, fighting on the Republican side in the 1922–24 Civil War. His mother was Elaine (née Lambert Lewis). She had been a young American folklorist with her own WNYC radio program, and thereafter became the noted author, E. L. Ranelagh (born 1914 New York, died 1996 London). A native New Yorker, she had moved to rural Ireland following her 1946 marriage to James. Their son John Ranelagh, who has three younger sisters, Bawn, Elizabeth and Fionn, was born in 1947. His wife is Elizabeth Grenville Hawthorne, author of Managing Grass for Horses (2005). Hawthorne is the daughter of the late Sir William Hawthorne.

== See also ==
- Channel 4
- Equinox
- TV2 Norway
