= John Stockwell (CIA officer) =

American activist and CIA officer (1937–2026)

John R. Stockwell
- Stockwell in 1978
- Born: August 27, 1937; Angleton, Texas, U.S.
- Died: June 2026 (aged 88); Austin, Texas, U.S.
- Occupations: CIA officer; Author
- Known for: Criticism of US foreign policy

John Robert Stockwell (August 27, 1937 – c. June 14, 2026) was an American CIA officer who became a critic of United States government policies after serving seven tours of duty over thirteen years. Having managed American involvement in the Angolan Civil War as Chief of the Angola Task Force during its 1975 covert operations, he resigned and wrote In Search of Enemies.

== Early years ==
Stockwell was born in Brazoria, Texas on August 27, 1937. After his birth, his Presbyterian father moved the family to the Belgian Congo when he was posted there to provide engineering assistance. Stockwell graduated from the University of Texas in 1959 with a bachelor's degree.

== CIA career ==
After serving three years in the United States Marine Corps Stockwell joined the CIA in 1964. He served as a case officer through three wars: the Congo Crisis, the Vietnam War, and the Angolan War of Independence. Stockwell spent six years in Africa, Chief of Base in the Katanga during the Bob Denard invasion in 1968, then Chief of Station in Bujumbura, Burundi, in 1970, before being transferred to Vietnam to oversee intelligence operations in the Tay Ninh province and was awarded the CIA Intelligence Medal of Merit for keeping his post open until the last days of the fall of Saigon in 1975.

In December 1976, he resigned from the CIA, citing deep concerns for the methods and results of CIA paramilitary operations in Third World countries and testified before Congressional committees. Two years later, he wrote the exposé In Search of Enemies, about that experience and its broader implications. He claimed that the CIA was counterproductive to national security, and that its "secret wars" provided no benefit for the United States. The CIA, he stated, had singled out the MPLA to be an enemy in Angola despite the fact that the MPLA wanted relations with the United States and had not committed a single act of aggression against the United States. In 1978 he appeared on the popular American television program 60 Minutes, claiming that CIA Director William Colby and National Security Advisor Henry Kissinger had systematically lied to Congress about the CIA's operations.

== Writing career ==
After leaving the CIA, Stockwell wrote the bestselling book, In Search of Enemies. The CIA retaliated by suing him for breaching security and Stockwell filed for bankruptcy to prevent the CIA from impounding the proceeds. The CIA was awarded 65 cents for every copy of the book that was sold.

A brief story in the book is about a CIA officer having Patrice Lumumba's body in the trunk of his car one night in then Elizabethville, Congo. Stockwell mentions in a footnote to the story that at the time he did not know that the CIA is documented as having repeatedly tried to arrange for Lumumba's assassination.

Stockwell further accused the US of orchestrating the coup against Kwame Nkrumah in Ghana, claiming that agents at the CIA's Accra station "maintained intimate contact with the plotters as a coup was hatched". Afterward, "inside CIA headquarters the Accra station was given full, if unofficial credit for the eventual coup. [...] None of this was adequately reflected in the agency's written records." Later that same year, Seymour Hersh, then at The New York Times, defended Stockwell's account, citing "first hand intelligence sources". He claimed that "many CIA operatives in Africa considered the agency's role in the overthrow of Nkrumah to have been pivotal." These claims have never been verified. In the 1992 Adam Curtis documentary Pandora's Box, Stockwell stated that CIA station chief Howard Bain made sure to leave no paper trail of the plot, and received a double promotion and an Intelligence Star after the coup succeeded.

Stockwell's novel, Red Sunset, was published in 1982.

In 1991, Stockwell published a compilation of transcriptions of many of his lectures called The Praetorian Guard.

== Personal life and death ==
Stockwell was found dead near his home in Austin, Texas, on June 14, 2026, after being reported missing the previous day. He was 88.

== See also ==
- Philip Agee, author, former CIA case officer in Mexico and Ecuador
- Robert Baer, author, former CIA case officer in Middle East
- Peer de Silva, author, former CIA Chief of Station in East Asia
- Richard Helms, author, former Director of CIA
- Victor Marchetti, author, special assistant to Helms
- Ray McGovern, former CIA senior analyst and national security adviser
- Ralph McGehee, author, former CIA case officer
- Peter Wright, author, principal scientific officer for MI5

== Books ==
- The Praetorian Guard: The US Role in the New World Order. Boston: South End Press (1991). ISBN 0896083950.
- Red Sunset. New York: William Morrow & Co. (1982).
- In Search of Enemies: A CIA Story. New York: W. W. Norton & Co. (1978). ISBN 0393009262.

== Filmography ==
- The C.I.A. Case Officer: John "Bob" Stockwell. Institute for Policy Studies (1978).
- The Secret World of the C.I.A: The Testimony of John Stockwell. Cambridge, Mass.: Insight Video (1988). OCLC 18296714.
