= John D. Marks =

American author (born 1943)

John D. Marks (born 1943) is the founder and former president of Search for Common Ground (SFCG), a nonprofit organization based in Washington, D.C., that focuses on international conflict management programming. Marks now acts as a senior adviser to SFCG. He is also a former foreign service officer of the U.S. Department of State, and he co-authored the 1974 book The CIA and the Cult of Intelligence with Victor Marchetti.

== Biography ==
Marks is a graduate of Phillips Academy and Cornell University. He worked for five years with the State Department, first in Vietnam and then as an analyst and staff assistant to the director of the Bureau of Intelligence and Research. After leaving the State Department, he became an executive assistant for foreign policy to US Senator Clifford Case (R-NJ), responsible within the senator's office for passage of the Case–Church Amendment, which eventually cut off funding for the Vietnam War.

=== The CIA and the Cult of Intelligence ===
External audio
- John D. Marks delivers remarks at the 1977 Libertarian Party National Convention (July 12–17, 1977), at the Sheraton-Palace Hotel in San Francisco

In 1973, Marks and Victor Marchetti completed writing The CIA and the Cult of Intelligence. CIA officials read the manuscript and told the authors that they had to remove 339 passages, nearly a fifth of the book. After long negotiations, the CIA yielded on 171 items, leaving 168 censored passages. The publisher, Alfred A. Knopf, decided to go ahead and publish the book with blanks for those passages, and with the sections that the CIA had originally cut then restored printed in boldface.

The publication of the book, which became a bestseller, raised concerns about the way the CIA was censoring information. It contributed to investigative reports by Seymour Hersh in The New York Times and the decision by Frank Church to establish the United States Senate Select Committee to Study Governmental Operations with Respect to Intelligence Activities, in 1975. The report, Foreign and Military Intelligence, was published in 1976.

Documents obtained from the CIA by Marks under Freedom of Information in 1976 showed that, in 1953, the agency considered purchasing ten kilograms of LSD, enough for 100 million doses. The proposed purchase aimed to stop other countries from controlling the supply. The documents showed that the CIA did obtain some quantity of the substance from Sandoz Laboratories, in Switzerland.

Marks delivered a speech on the book at Turning Point 1977, the 1977 Libertarian Party National Convention held July 12–17, at the Sheraton-Palace Hotel, in San Francisco.

=== The Search for the Manchurian Candidate ===
Marks' 1979 book, The Search for the Manchurian Candidate, describes a wide range of CIA activities during the Cold War, including unethical drug experiments as part of a mind-control and chemical interrogation research program known as Project MKUltra. The book is based on 16,000 pages of CIA documents obtained under the Freedom of Information Act and many interviews, including those with retired members of the psychological division of the CIA, and the book describes some of the work of psychologists in this effort, with a whole chapter on the Personality Assessment System.

Marks later became a fellow of Harvard's Institute of Politics and a visiting scholar at Harvard Law School. In 1982, he founded the nonprofit conflict resolution organization Nuclear Network in Washington, D.C., which was soon renamed Search for Common Ground. He served as its president until 2014. He also founded and headed Common Ground Productions. He wrote and produced The Shape of the Future, a four-part TV documentary series that was simulcast on Israeli, Palestinian, and Arab satellite TV, and he is executive producer of the television and radio show The Team, among others.

== Honors and accolades ==
John Marks is the recipient of numerous awards. These include:

- Honorary doctorate from the UN University of Peace (2010, with his wife, Susan Collin Marks)
- Marvin E. Johnson Diversity and Equity Award, from the Association for Conflict Resolution (2010, with Susan Collin Marks)
- Senior Ashoka Fellow (2009)
- Social Entrepreneurship Award, from the Skoll Foundation (2006, with Susan Collin Marks)
- Temple Awards for Creative Altruism, from the Institute of Noetic Sciences (2005, with Susan Collin Marks)
- Cultures of Peace Award, from Psychologists for Social Responsibility (2002)
- Wild School Award, from Upland Hills School (2001, with Susan Collin Marks)

== Works ==
=== Books ===
- The CIA and the Cult of Intelligence, with Victor Marchetti. New York: Alfred A. Knopf (1974). Full text.
- The CIA File, edited with Robert Borosage. New York: Grossman Publishers (1976). ISBN 067022247X.

"Proceedings and papers presented at a conference, The CIA and Covert Action, held in Washington, Sept. 1974, sponsored by the Center for National Security Studies."

- The Search for the Manchurian Candidate: The CIA and Mind Control. New York: Times Books (1979).
- Common Ground on Terrorism: Soviet-American Cooperation Against the Politics of Terror, edited with Igor Beliaev. New York: W. W. Norton (1991). ISBN 0393029867. ISBN 978-0393029864.

=== Articles ===
- "Inside the CIA: The Clandestine Mentality," with Victor Marchetti. Ramparts Magazine (Jul. 1974), pp. 21–25, 48, 50, 52.
- "How to Spot a Spook". Washington Monthly (Nov. 1974), pp. 5–11.
- "One Man We Remembered." Washington Monthly (Jun. 1975), pp. 26–29.
- "Sex, Drugs, and the CIA: The Shocking Search for an 'Ultimate Weapon'". Saturday Review (February 3, 1979), pp. 12–16.
