= Ralph McGehee =

Central Intelligence Agency officer (1928–2020)

McGehee playing football for University of Notre Dame

Ralph Walter McGehee Jr (April 9, 1928 – May 2, 2020) was an American case officer for the Central Intelligence Agency (CIA) for 25 years and an author.

From 1953 to 1972, his assignments were in East Asia and Southeast Asia, where he held administrative posts. After leaving intelligence work in 1977, he publicly expressed views highly critical of the CIA.

== Early life ==
McGehee was born in 1928 at Moline, Illinois. His father, originally from Kentwood, Louisiana, where his family had lived for three generations, was of Scotch-Irish descent, and had moved to Illinois when a teenager. His mother was from neighboring Osyka, Mississippi. Along with his older sister, they then had moved from Moline to Chicago about 1930. While a student at Tilden Tech, a "working class" high school in south Chicago now known as Tilden High School, he was All State in football, and class president. Although a Baptist, he attended the University of Notre Dame where he was a starting tackle on the football team. For the four seasons 1946 to 1949, they never lost a game, and won three national championships. McGehee obtained a B.S. in Business Administration, cum laude.

He married Norma Galbreath in 1948. He had met her at a Presbyterian Church in south Chicago while home on vacation from Notre Dame. They had four children, two girls followed by two boys. Often but not always, his wife and children would move their family home to accompany him, while on foreign assignments with the CIA. After graduation from Notre Dame, he tried professional football with the Green Bay Packers. Then he coached the offensive line in the football program at the University of Dayton for a year. Returning to Chicago, circa 1951, he took a job as a management trainee at Montgomery Ward.

== Recruitment by the CIA ==
In January 1952, McGehee was recruited by the CIA. Decades later, he would describe himself, and his political outlook then, as "gung ho" America, a young cold warrior, ready to go.

Understanding it was an important government job with foreign travel, McGehee first was interviewed at the courthouse. The recruiters declined to name the federal agency that might be his new employer. He traveled from Chicago to Washington, D.C., where he joined a pool of over 100 candidates, men and women. Several weeks of extensive testing and lectures followed. Having survived this shake out, he began a month-long orientation, which featured cold war rhetoric and films. With 50 men he entered a "basic operations" course on espionage, to fit them for the CIA's Directorate for Plans. Then with 30 others he attended a six-week paramilitary course at the CIA's Camp Peary (known as the "farm") near Williamsburg, Virginia. Many there were former college football players. The curriculum included parachute jumping, demolition, weapons, and a "hellish obstacle course".

Thereafter he was posted to his initial CIA post.

== CIA assignments ==
=== Japan and the Philippines, 1953–1956 ===
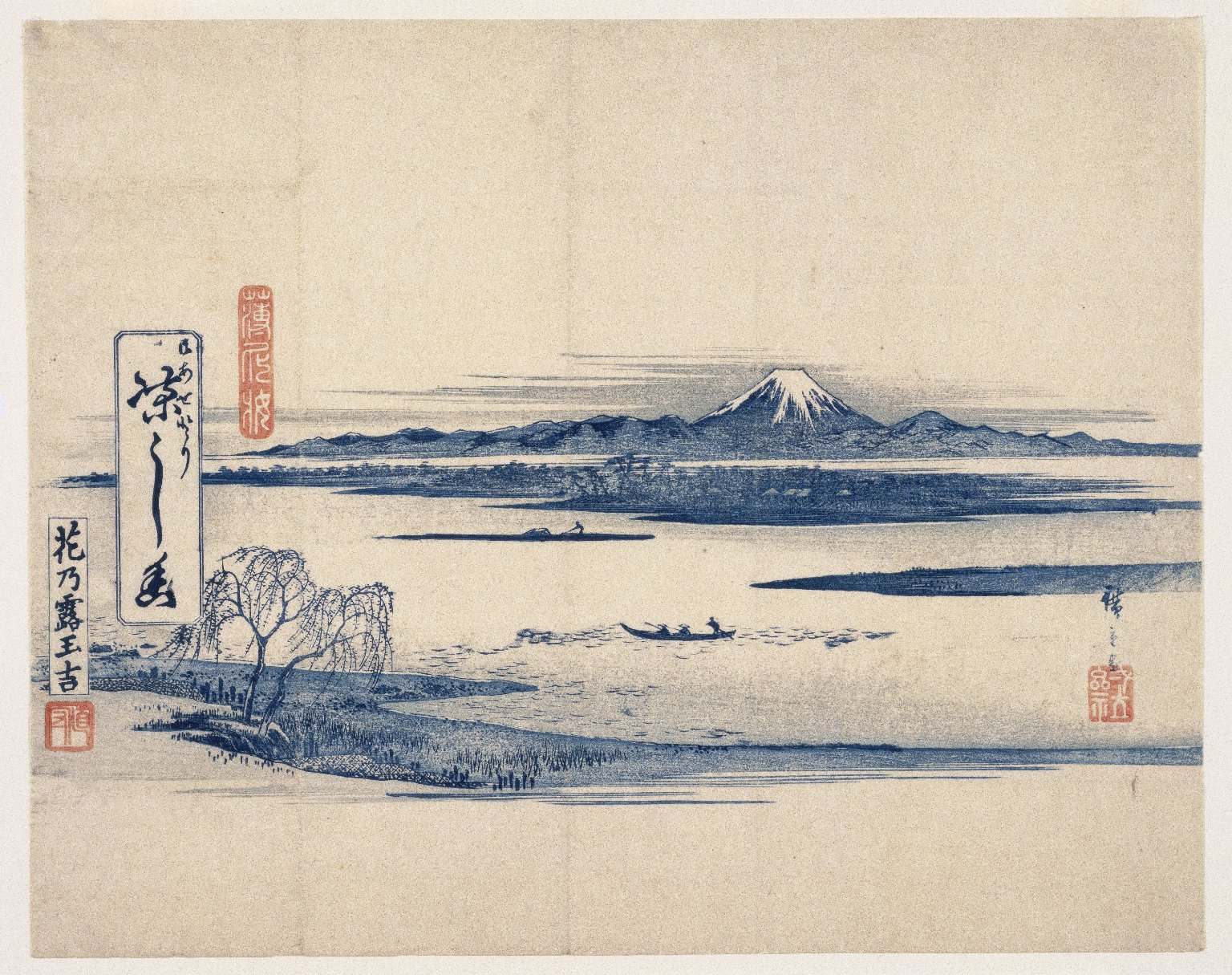
Mount Fuji, woodblock print

McGehee was sent to Japan, where he went to work for the China operations group. The group's task was, in conjunction with allied governments, to gather intelligence on the PRC. The group in the Tokyo area supervised and supported four other offices or bases in East Asia (Seoul, Taiwan, Hong Kong, Okinawa). His job "unfortunately" was as a file checker. Yet he appreciated being involved in "the immense and noble effort to save the world from the International Communist Conspiracy".

He lived with his wife and daughters in a beautiful home in Hayama. They had a maid and a gardener, and a view of Mount Fuji. Husband and wife "became intoxicated with the romance of being overseas." There was "a close knit community of Agency families". A son was born to them. Yet his wife would repeat her complaints about CIA rules which prohibited any talk of company business, even within families; she insisted that the "marital bonds and trust" should be the stronger.

After two and a half years, the China operations group moved to Subic Bay in the Philippines. Desmond FitzGerald, the CIA's Chief of Station (COS) there, would become one of the Agency's top leaders. He was a long-time friend of William Colby (the CIA Director in the 1970s). Yet because of CIA secrecy, and its "need to know" policy, McGehee knew comparatively little about its operations worldwide. The CIA's China operations at Subic Bay were then terminated, and the McGehees returned home.

=== CIA HQ, Washington, 1956–1959 ===
At CIA headquarters near the Washington Monument, McGehee became chief of records for counterintelligence at China activities, basically supervising the work he had been doing in Japan. His office had a staff of 15 women; he admitted that some "could do a better job" than him. Two requests routinely came in: for a "file trace" (a search for records about a person, e.g., a candidate for doing business with the Agency); and a "clearance" (a more thorough check, often for potential CIA employees). Yet in general CIA records were in a deplorable condition. Huge piles of backorders were common. An expert proposed working criteria for selecting files to destroy, e.g., duplicates, nonsense, useless. Other problems were addressed, such as carding information. In McGehee's unit, the Chinese characters (often ambiguous to non-Chinese) could be variously transliterated into different roman letters, making for file repetition and much confusion. Instead, each character was reduced to a 4-digit number.

From Saigon a former Chinese politician claimed that his contacts back in China had excellent intelligence, which they sent him by short-wave radio. The politician sought "financial support" in return for current political information. His reports appeared to be very valuable. But an allied intelligence agency told CIA that a "newspaper clipping service" in Saigon was the probable source. When CIA tried to listen in to transmissions, there was silence. Instead, his "intelligence" was being fabricated from bits and pieces of local Chinese press coverage, rewritten to make the incidents more significant to CIA. Yet the "germ of truth" in each gave it verisimilitude. Later, CIA discovered that the operation was run by a Taiwan intelligence agency. The rewrites told a story about mainland China that Taiwan wanted to spread.

After many applications for a change in status, McGehee was promoted. Following a 3-months training course, he'd be a CIA case officer.

=== Taiwan, 1959–1961 ===
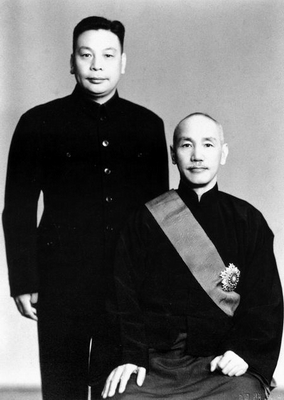
Chiang Ching-kuo and Chiang Kai-shek

As a case officer his work involved liaison with his Chinese counterparts in various Nationalist intelligence services. Their common purpose was collecting information on the PRC. The CIA worked with Taiwan "to train and drop teams of Chinese on the mainland to develop resistance movements and gather intelligence." When mainland fishermen were detained on Chinmen Island [aka Quemoy], McGehee would go out for the debriefing. The PRC shelled the island on certain hours every other day, hitting only barren spots according to a "gentleman's agreement". The 1958 Quemoy-Matsu Crisis was still fresh.

The CIA had great difficulty recruiting agents for espionage activity on the mainland. Hence its intelligence on what it then called 'Red China' was very patchy. Apparently the CIA missed the great extent of the famine in China caused by the Great Leap Forward.

Taiwan offered to share one of its best agents. American officers taught him the CIA system on many espionage subjects, marveling that he was "the best agent they had ever trained." He was to stay in radio contact daily while on the mainland. After four months away, he returned. Yet when away he seldom made radio contact. His excuses for this didn't add up. McGehee could not be sure if he was a duplicitous Nationalist, "playing games with us", or was working for the Communists.

Ray Cline, soon to become a major figure in American intelligence, was the COS in Taiwan. As a friend of the COS, Chiang Ching-kuo, son of the Generalisimo, would visit the CIA club. For an upcoming CIA "hail and farewell" gathering, a particularly lavish costume party was planned, with an Indian tribe theme. The COS and McGehee's "clique" of eight couples attended. During his late night drive home, McGehee saw "hovels of Taiwanese people" who were dressed in rags, in "a struggle to stay alive".

=== CIA HQ, Langley, 1961–1962 ===
Largely because of its Bay of Pigs disaster, CIA headquarters was "rife with despair and upheaval". Based on news reports, McGehee thought "the Agency had relied too much on an anticipated uprising by the Cuban people." The CIA's move into its new 7-story headquarters building in Langley, Virginia, began in late 1961. It was located 9 miles from Washington on 219 acres and "resembled a college campus". But excitement was curtailed by a cut in personnel, one in five to be fired. The survivors celebrated. The new offices for China activities were on the third floor. After 9 months, he was offered an overseas position in Thailand.

=== Thailand (1), 1962–1964 ===
By its Northeast border Thailand is hill country. McGehee had set up a home/office there. He worked on his Thai. On the wall he placed a poster featuring an evil-looking Mao and Ho Chi Minh. Contributing to cold war tension was fear of a bloodbath in event of a takeover. CIA liaison work dealt with the local Thai Border Patrol Police (BPP).

His interpreter, Captain Song (as McGehee calls him), also headed the Thai counterinsurgency operations. Song had good rapport with the locals and hill tribes, but "took an immediate dislike to anyone with direct authority over him." There were many minority ethnic groups in the rugged terrain, with several plotting for political independence from neighboring Burma. The remote hill tribes practiced a slash-and-burn agriculture, necessitating frequent relocations; their "major cash crop was opium from the poppy." At the moment the border was quiescent. China apparently failed to notice when the CIA's airplane accidentally crossed the border.

Perhaps unintentionally, political infighting developed among some Americans. Yet the COS was naturally gregarious, avoiding conflict. He'd nurtured a close relationship with Prime Minister Sarit Thanarat. The American ambassador, however, did not get along well with Sarit. At a well-attended state ceremony, Sarit avoided the ambassador in favor of the COS. This exacerbated ill-feelings at the top. McGehee called the COS "Rod Johnson".

Meanwhile, the deputy COS of CIA in Bangkok had called on McGehee (now back in the north) to report to the station. Also given a fictitious name, the deputy had acquired a bad reputation (bullying, manipulation, grudge holding). The COS and his deputy made a good cop, bad cop pair. As McGehee listened in the deputy's office, he eventually came to the point where, McGehee writes, he "was tearing down my superiors in my presence and asking me to spy on them for him!" Consequently, McGehee's ethics disappointed the ambitious deputy. McGehee figured he became the latest addition to the deputy's enemy list; he then thought that people like this deputy COS, who put his career above the mission, were "aberrations" among otherwise dedicated CIA agents. Rather McGehee continued to idealize CIA activities as "somewhere between the Peace Corps and missionary work".

On a 3-week hike to visit remote villages in the Northeast highlands, McGehee lost 20 pounds. Delivery of medical goods and agricultural implements to the tribes furthered the civil development side of counterinsurgency work. To further both objectives, "small mountain airstrips" would facilitate transport to the more isolated areas. The first Yao village had about "two dozen bamboo houses with roofs of thatch" spread out on the hillside. The "gentle, intelligent" village headman agreed, at an evening meal, to build the airstrips. That morning a CIA plane had dropped supplies by parachute, scattering them over the mountain forest. A location for the airstrip was found, and young men selected to be trained. Other airstrips were arranged at other villages. Yet a few years later, because of "communist influence on the Lao border" the villages were "bombed and napalmed" by Thai warplanes. It was a bitter end for the hill tribes.

=== CIA HQ, Langley, 1964–1965 ===
At the Thai desk in Langley, McGehee's job was to keep track of the continuations of the work he had done in Thailand. He called it paper pushing. The general advice was not to be harsh, which seemed to encourage platitudes. Many of the reports from Bangkok station concerned the Communist Party of Thailand. Once a week Colby, the Far East division chief (and later DCI), would review the reports (with Langley comments) and pass on "rating sheets" that had been written up. These would be sent back to the reporting stations around the world, where they would be read with gravitas as the view from headquarters.

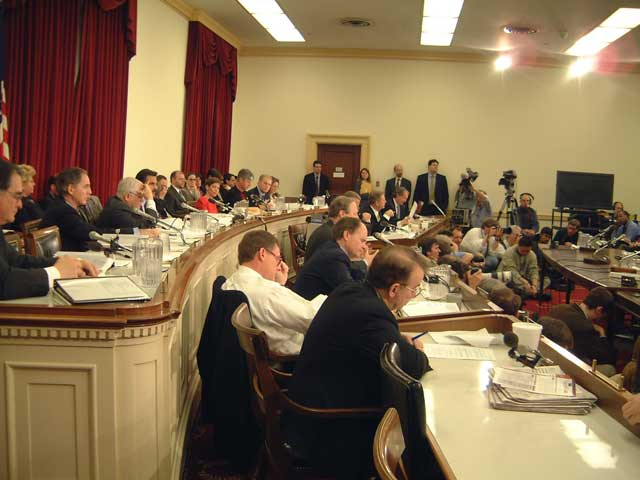
A Subcommittee of Congress in session

It was announced that Colby would brief a Congressional committee about the 'secret war' in Laos. He wanted approval for new plans of CIA. At first McGehee was pleased to be part of the team doing the preparation work. Colby stressed the importance of using the right word. In finding the best name for Hmong tribal groups that fought against communists guerillas, the middle path between "Hunter-Killer Teams" and "Home Defense Units" was agreed to be "Mobile Strike Forces". Facts seemed open to be tweaked into what might make a better argument. An 'ineffective' present situation could become 'what it might be'. McGehee considered it "duping Congress". Colby obtained approval.

President Johnson began to escalate the war in Vietnam. In Thailand a China-based group announced the start of the revolution. McGehee asked his desk chief to help him arrange a return to Thailand.

=== Thailand (2), 1965–1967 ===
Back in Thailand McGehee's first assignment was assisting in liaison work with "a small Thai counterinsurgency force" that the CIA itself had created. These Thai agents gathered information on communist activities; they also acted as a secret police. McGehee doubted the quality of information gathered by "untrained interrogators" from poorly vetted sources, yet at first he wrote it up for CIA reports. Then he co-wrote a review of this large accumulation of counterinsurgency data. He concluded that without detailed processing, e.g., carding the information into "geographic and subject files", the "inchoate mess remained just that". Thus, here in Thailand or back at CIA HQ in Washington, an analyst collating it "could make of it just about anything he wanted to".

McGehee came across an ambitious CIA case officer who guarded his field data in a locked file room. He claimed to be running, as a paid CIA spy, the important leader of a Communist splinter group. After this case officer left Thailand, it was discovered that his paid spy was a phony, a "fabricator" of useless, so-called intelligence. So unmasked, the 'spy' then wrote a book attacking the CIA.

==== Survey ====
Following the departure of the disagreeable deputy COS, the CIA station offered McGehee the job of "establishing an intelligence-collection program" for "the 50,000-man national police". After questioning the criteria and support available (especially his status per the American Agency for International Development (AID) program), McGehee welcomed this "difficult and challenging" task. He characterized it as "my Mission Impossible: convert a bunch of unschooled patrolmen into sophisticated intelligence gatherers and do it without money and the authority that comes with it." His subsequent work here to develop the intelligence Survey program would define his second tour in Thailand.

Royal Police of Thailand

McGehee met with Colonel Chat Chai, head of police intelligence. Its personnel knew little about Communist organization and had no intelligence training. Overcoming the Colonel's initial suspicion, they toured police HQ in Bangkok and later the provinces. Since 1963 a budding insurgency in Thailand had received some local support and had mounted some assassinations and ambushes. Although little was clearly understood, the CIA thought several thousand Communists in guerrilla bands hid out in the highlands, chiefly in the Thai northeast, and raided lowland villages for "rice, money and recruits".

From the literature on intelligence gathering in counterinsurgency situations, McGehee initially adopted a 'mail box' technique. It functioned like the 'suggestion box' in civilian life. The literate villager could provide information anonymously, about local insurgent activities, and about the identities and whereabouts of communist 'jungle soldiers' and supporters ... yet remain safe from reprisals. Government agents, however, could not confirm the data so sourced, nor ask follow-up questions. This "germ of an idea I was later to develop into a full-scale, effective intelligence-counterinsurgency operation," wrote McGehee. Eventually, in-person interviews of the local villager and farmer (called taking a "census") was appraised to provide better information and results. Joining the team was Lieutenant Somboon, a university graduate with "a remarkably intuitive feel for the esoteric art of intelligence gathering." He was serving then as a local deputy nai amphur (sheriff).

McGehee proposed to develop a "pilot project" and to first concentrate on one district. A thorough Survey of the views of the rural villagers and farmers would be made. The province governor helped recruit a select group of twenty-five agents with which to start. Beside police, it included military officers, several administrators, and a high-ranking educator. Also part of the team were four translators and a PAT armed force for protection against communist guerrillas. Questionnaires were developed and the Survey's interrogators trained in their use "out of hearing range of other[s]". Also started were village networks for community support and for ongoing intelligence sources. As a corresponding result, some villagers confessed to being "duped" by the Communists, named other members, then quit the 'movement' and joined the government side.

Lt. Somboon gave a motivating speech at a meeting of villagers called by their headman, which successfully countered Communist propaganda. He and others, however, also used aggressive techniques involving simulated threats of death and other cruel ruses to obtain information from suspected guerrillas, or "to sow dissension" in enemy ranks. Such methods raised human rights issues for McGehee. Counterinsurgency, if not careful, could descend into a barbarous business. Yet he was then persuaded that an efficient intelligence process, even if somewhat flawed, which also threw light on murky shadows where the guerrillas hid, would save lives in the long run of a counterinsurgency war. In fact, the Survey and police presence itself resulted in many villagers abandoning the armed communist insurgency.

Survey information, so collected then translated, was carded into categories, and collated, and digested, then written up. From the bits and pieces of "vague, partial, shifting, incomplete, fragmentary intelligence", it provided a hitherto "unknown total picture." It revealed, among other things, that the communist insurgency in northeast Thailand was considerably stronger than originally supposed. It also struck a blow. The Survey was distributed nationwide to government and police officials, who praised the CIA case officer responsible. The COS 'Rod Johnson' called him to CIA in Bangkok where his work was celebrated; he was promoted to a 2-year command in Thailand. Ralph McGehee felt he had hit his stride, and was reaching new levels of professional skill and acumen.

==== William Colby's visit and ends of Survey ====
William Colby, then chief of the CIA's Far East division, came to the province in 1967. McGehee proudly told him of his teams' work on the district Survey and its findings, showing him the file cabinets with the carded and collated intelligence information. The Communists in Thailand, he explained, were far more numerous than assumed. They also enjoyed substantial support among rural people. Communist agents concentrated on "winning the cooperation of the peasants," citing the example of a specific village. Yet the Survey had, by throwing light on the insurgent violence, caused villagers to re-think the issues and many to desert the Communist cause. McGehee naturally expected some appreciation from Colby and interest in furthering the Survey work. But Colby kept his silence.

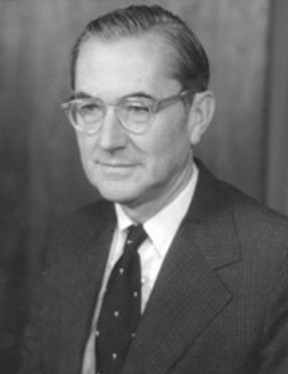
William Colby in the 1970s

McGehee described the enemy's Farmers' Liberation Association (FLA). It recruited rural villagers, who were then secretly indoctrinated about Communist plans for widespread armed struggle in Thailand. Local guerrilla cadres were already launching minor terrorist assaults. In retaliation the Thai government ordered unfocused, brutal attacks that often fell on innocent farmers, creating an "atmosphere of hate" that the Communists were eager to exploit politically. To the contrary, McGehee's Survey teams had "used our intelligence to penetrate the Communists' crucial shield of secrecy" and accordingly had broken their grip on the villagers. Farmers had confessed, given information, and quit the FLA. Here, McGehee felt he was presenting to Colby a counterinsurgency program that worked. Otherwise, Communists insurgents would multiply in Thailand, as had happened in Vietnam.

In response, Colby appeared puzzled. He was non-committal, evasive, eventually saying only, "We always seem to be losing." Later McGehee realized that Colby was "probably weighing the broader ramifications." Colby and his entourage then quickly left for the airport in jeeps and land rovers. Two months later the COS offered McGehee a plum CIA job in Taiwan on a career channel ensuring rapid promotions. But McGehee wanted to continue his work in Thailand. Au contraire the COS told him. He had to leave Thailand in three weeks, and the Survey project would be terminated. Despite local protests by involved Thai officials and by the American consul, it happened that way.

=== CIA HQ, Langley, 1967–1968 ===
McGehee arrived at headquarters still mystified by the surprising and unexplained decision, which must have been made by Colby, to terminate the Survey program. The plum job in Taiwan, that had been dangled before him, proved to be a ruse to get him out of the way; upon his arrival at the Langley, it was already cancelled. McGehee writes that he was "having a difficult time justifying my previously idealistic view of the Agency."

The head of China activities offered him a desk job. Judging by past results, repetitive failure seemed to be the story about the job's major task: "recruiting a Chinese official to be our spy." The track record showed a repeating cycle of fruitless attempts: new idea, enthusiasm, field action, failure; new idea, enthusiasm... . E.g., after the war it became known that CIA estimates of the Chinese military in Vietnam were egregiously low.

Despite the Sino-Soviet split, McGehee thought, some in the China desk seemed to have a "vested interest" in keeping China as a major enemy. The CIA had obtained a recent, 40-page China document that detailed the PRC's long-range foreign policy and short-range moves. Nonetheless, China desk decided not to circulate it, McGehee reasoned, because the PRC's plans were reasonable, not belligerent.

He wrote a memorandum to put the Thailand Survey program back in play. First he sent it to Colby's new replacement at the Far East division (without success), then to a suggestion committee. The China desk leader then told him that he'd ruffled the new Far East division chief, whose anger was jeopardizing his career. McGehee wrote later about his "awakening" to see the CIA in a new, cynical way. Vietnam was in a situation somewhat similar to Thailand. He volunteered to serve CIA in Vietnam, something nobody with an eye on their career was doing in 1968. Then, out of the blue, the CIA's office of training told him how good the Thailand Survey program looked. They were already teaching this "McGehee method" as a major part of counterinsurgency training at the CIA "farm" in Virginia. Yet the Far East division remained uninterested.

=== Vietnam, 1968–1970 ===
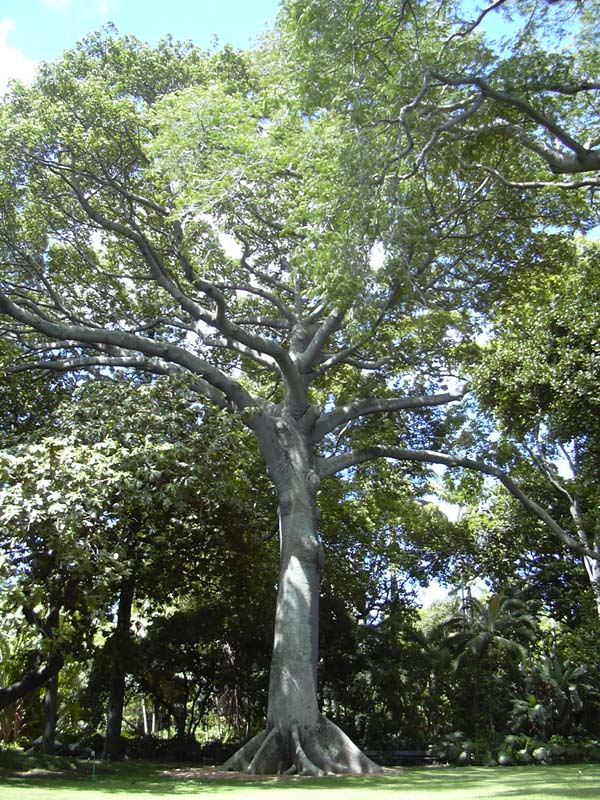
Sài Gòn may refer to bông gòn trees

McGehee arrived at Tan Son Nhut airport outside of Saigon in October 1968. The Viet Cong's Tet Offensive had struck at cities the previous January. He'd last visited Saigon in 1960, which then seemed "a peaceful city with tree-lined boulevards," with herbal aromas and flower markets, and "Vietnamese women wearing the flowing ao-dai". Now in the downtown he was unpleasantly surprised by Tu Do Street, where "an atmosphere of hate permeated the air" like "the clouds of [vehicle] exhaust". Bars, massage parlors, and rock music catered to American G.I.s. In a very much larger, congested Saigon, the Vietnamese shared their streets also with Chinese merchants and Indian Sikhs.

==== Disenchantment with the CIA ====
In his 1983 book, McGehee at this point describes the institutional history of the CIA and counterinsurgency in Vietnam, in caustic terms informed by his later turn to the left. Yet in 1968 he remained "still fiercely anti-communist". From his own experience in Thailand, however, McGehee was already convinced that "intelligence reports ... had nothing to do with reality". Immediately he wrote a memorandum to the Saigon COS suggesting incorporation of the learning from his Thailand intelligence Survey.

McGehee's first assignment was as "regional officer in charge" (ROIC) in Gia Định province near Saigon. As expected, he found its intelligence and field operations seriously flawed. After a useless meeting headed by Colby the newly appointed head of Civil Operations and Rural Development Support (CORDS), he spoke with Colby. McGehee hid his harsh criticism and contempt, figuring that a cocktail party was the wrong forum, and that surely Colby already knew what McGehee wanted to say.

After six weeks McGehee started work in charge of liaison with the chief of South Vietnam's Special Police. His CIA boss, who was new to Asia, listened to McGehee after getting his memorandum. "Ralph, the rest of the world sees things differently," he said, "How can you be right?" Slowly, McGehee had come to conclude that "the vast majority of the Vietnamese people were fighting against the U.S. troops and for the NLF." He became isolated and tense.

After qualifying for home leave after six months, his wife listened only so long to his repetitive monologue. Ironically, DCI Richard Helms now gave him an award for his Survey work, presented by his nemesis the Far East Division chief. McGehee began to identify with anti-war protestors. Seeking release, he considered changing jobs, but realized his career experience was a CIA secret. With four children in school and a mortgage, he returned to South Vietnam.

==== Investigating a spy ring ====
Back in Saigon, he followed Special Police reports apparently about "a North Vietnamese spy net that had penetrated the highest levels of the Thieu government of South Vietnam." Called Operation Projectile, its dubious sources and flimsy information caused widespread doubt. Yet further investigation seemed to verify its explosive charges. CIA headquarters delayed authorization for making arrests, as many suspects were high South Vietnamese government officials. McGehee then reorganized and 'carded' the office files on the putative spy net. He was a past master at interpreting information from field reports. He exhumed and deciphered a cock-eyed old document. It turned out to record a similar spy ring from the Diem era, with many matches to current espionage activity and agents. It proved convincing.

Although apprehensive, CIA HQ gave the ok for a mass arrest of suspects. When President Thieu was solicited, he became "extremely upset" and suggested delay until he could dismiss the spies from his government. Finally, he agreed. Great caution was exercised to prevent leaks. "At midnight the police fanned out through Saigon" in three-man arrest teams. 50 were arrested, 41 were later tried and convicted. Huynh Van Trong held the highest government office, but his communist superior Vu Ngoc Nha was a close friend of Thieu. Trong had recently made a high-level trip to Washington. McGehee comments that while we were not able to recruit a single "clear-cut, high-ranking Viet Cong agent", the communists made "thousands of penetrations".

By fortunate coincidence the arrests also brought in Van Khien, an officer at North Vietnam military intelligence. He was leading a penetration "into command elements of the South Vietnamese army (ARVN)." Further investigations turned up ten more spies, and its unraveling resulted in further arrests. McGehee's liaison office had become a high-performance operation, with quality intelligence work and a steady stream of reports. Yet McGehee was not promoted, despite his pro-active insistence. Another CIA agent, however, who McGehee thought an "incompetent flake" later gained advancement because of his loyalty to the station chief. When his tour ended, the Special Police gave McGehee a medal.

On the flight home, McGehee reflected on his last few years in Vietnam. "The reality that I had seen and reported and urged my superiors to recognize had been totally rejected." It had cost him his ideals. "Full of anger, hatred, and fear, I bitterly contemplated a dismal future." He recalled that when at Gia Dinh province early in his tour, he had considered suicide, in despair at the horrible events of the war: the deaths, the napalm, the children and the old people in refugee camps. Instead he'd vowed to "expose the Agency's role in Vietnam" due to its fantasies and illusions. When McGehee was in despair at Gia Dinh, "the seed of [his] book was first planted."

=== CIA HQ, Langley, 1970 ===
McGehee was set to return for another tour of duty in Thailand. At headquarters he attended several briefings, yet he was growing increasingly dissatisfied with the CIA as an institution. While back in Washington, he looked for another job; yet his lack of any work history (due to his inability to list his CIA employment) sank his efforts. In addition, his transforming state of mind made it difficult for him to effectively communicate, with anyone. He could not talk to his children about his changing attitudes toward the CIA and the cold war. On campus at Georgetown he noticed young dissenters. He wanted the war to stop, too, but felt paralyzed by internal conflicts.

=== Thailand (3), 1970–1972 ===
The Thailand station was a large installation. McGehee performed as "deputy chief of the anti-Communist Party operations branch". He supervised many case officers working in liaison. Yet he realized that with the CIA nothing had changed—except his own views. U.S. policy goals determined what intelligence was collected. In support of a military dictatorship the CIA "never reported derogatory information". American intelligence often came from Thai leaders or liaison counterparts. Agency case officers were forbidden to "maintain direct contact with the general population". 80% of Thais were farmers, but their issues were seldom addressed. For a case officer to get information from the working classes, he risked getting the label "gone native" followed by a ticket home. McGehee mentions the secret war in Laos, but he did not directly participate. Although remaining committed "to stop the spread of the Communist Party of Thailand" he opposed what he considered the CIA's false testimony and counterproductive operations.

In Udorn, north Thailand, McGehee met with the police colonel, Chat Chai, he'd worked with on the Survey program. McGehee noticed he'd changed, from a hard working, no non-sense leader, to a more relaxed cynic. They spoke together for hours at a hotel's roof-top restaurant. McGehee found the Survey deputy nai amphur, Lieutenant Somboon, in Bangkok. Stationed in south Thailand, he now faced an insurgency, and spoke up about how good the Survey project went. Confused about why it'd been dropped, McGehee replied that it'd been overruled by higher-ups. Latter in a coffee shop McGehee spotted a classmate, Jimmy Moe, from the CIA paramilitary course at its farm in Virginia almost 20 years ago. He'd fought in the secret war in Laos, where the CIA had led the Hmong tribe to defeat. "We contemplated each other, and a thousand thoughts passed unspoken between us.".

Failing to get a promised promotion McGehee wrote "a long, bitter memorandum" that he routed to the COS. McGehee claimed that the current, unnamed COS "let his secretary run the station". The touring CIA Inspector General had then put McGehee on "special probation". Yet very soon McGehee required back surgery. He was flown to Georgetown Hospital in Washington.

=== CIA HQ, Langley, 1972–1977 ===
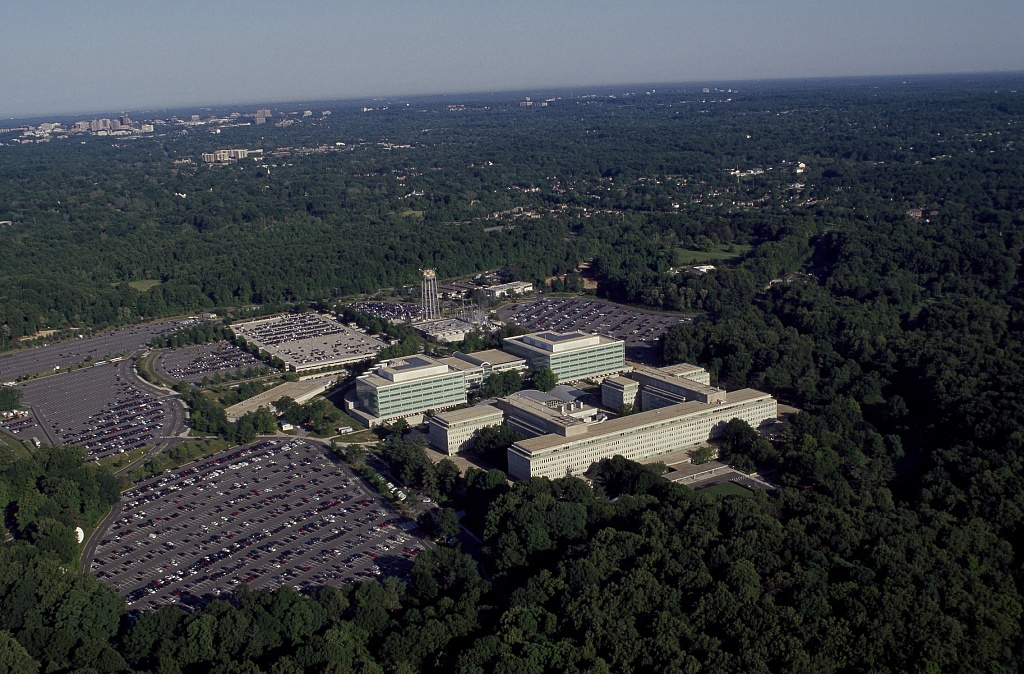
CIA Headquarters in Langley

McGehee arrived at the East Asia Division, where the personnel manager told him he'd been recommended for counseling. After McGehee mentioned his last memo to Shackley, he got the label of a "malcontent". Shackley became the head of East Asia Division. McGehee was then turned down by all East Asia branch offices. His request to transfer from CIA Operations to its Intelligence Directorate as an analyst, had been declined. While on temporary assignment at an obscure records office, he wrote a memorandum to Colby detailing the CIA's intelligence flaws in Vietnam. Unexpectedly, he was then sent back to Thailand for a few months. In the meantime, the new DCI James Schlesinger (Feb. 2 to July 2, 1973) had been blindsided by Watergate revelations. The CIA got bad press. Schlesinger then sought information about any other illegal or unsavory activity committed by the Agency. The result was a list known to CIA as the Skeletons, but to outsiders as the Family Jewels. McGehee in Thailand didn't get news of it until the deadline had passed.

Eventually McGehee was placed as the Far East Division's "referent" (representative) to the 'international communism branch' (ICB) of the Directorate's notorious 'counterintelligence staff'. He became isolated, which lasted for his remaining four years. "Everything now angered me. I openly laughed at the serious pronouncements made by Agency leaders, pointing out the fallacies behind the rhetoric." He endured the "silent treatment" from the Directorate's leadership. "Former friends avoided me and I them," McGehee writes. His assigned duties, however, took only "about one hour a day." It required him to review incoming paper: cables from the CIA, State, and Defense; communist publications and transcripts of communist radio broadcasts; a few newspapers. Each day selections were mounted on a "clipboard". Apart from this, he charted his own course. Eventually he obtained approval for his chosen research.

==== Propaganda: planted news ====
It was standard CIA practice to anonymously place stories in news publications with stories written to spread ideas favorable to CIA goals. Accordingly, these stories were edited to misdirect some readers. The stories that the CIA planted might be further spread by third parties, in a slightly altered form, or even picked up as news and then rewritten by a journalist. McGehee himself, in doing his assigned duties, followed news stories in the international press, communist affairs in particular. He also monitored incoming intelligence reports for such topics.

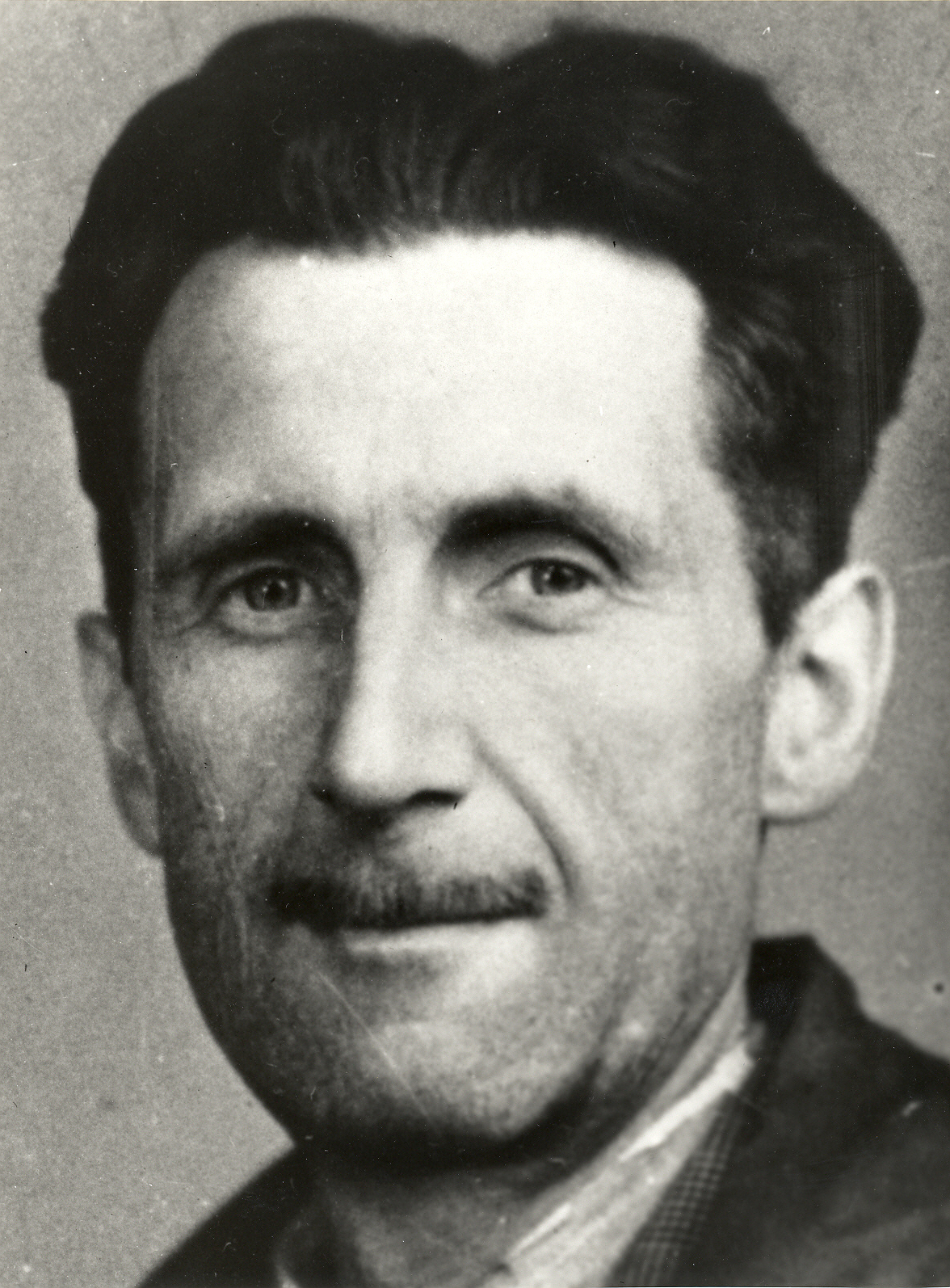
George Orwell

Eventually McGehee began to notice a subtle congruence in content between the planted stories and the incoming intelligence. Propaganda that the CIA generated to shape world opinion could circle back and contaminate the CIA's own information files. McGehee gives an example. The CIA in 1965 fabricated a story about weapon shipments sent by sea to the Viet Cong (to show foreign support). The CIA even staged its discovery for the press. The Marines later began to patrol the coast to intercept the reported contraband.

To stress his experience of CIA's disregard for the truth of an event, McGehee refers to Orwell's duplicitous 'Ministry of Truth' from the novel 1984. The intelligence trade has developed terms for a wider category of fact manipulation, which range from black propaganda, to grey, to white.

==== Facts: Thailand and Vietnam ====
A tipping point for McGehee was in 1975, when he learned about the prior work of CIA analyst Sam Adams. In 1966–1967 Adams had, without success, challenged the then prevailing intelligence reports regarding the count of communist combatants in South Vietnam, asserting that it was too low. Although Adams had supporters within the CIA, the Army's MACV insisted on its lower numbers. The dispute became notorious. MACV then directed American combat forces fighting in Vietnam, and considered the issue its turf. Ultimately, per the 1967 SNIE, the CIA politically acquiesced. To Adams, the CIA here betrayed its mission by agreeing to doctored intelligence. McGehee saw parallels between Adams' situation and his own mid-1960s Thailand Survey.

McGehee also considered his critical views confirmed in the 1975–1976 Congressional investigations of the CIA, by Pike's House committee, and by Frank Church's Senate committee. Both committees had faulted the CIA for its handling of specific covert operations, and for several intelligence failures.

==== Reading Asian communists ====
About CIA's information on certain of its political strategic enemies, McGehee wrote: "Totally ignored by the Agency were four [sources] about Asian communism: French writings ... ; State Department 'China hands' ... ; American scholars and newsmen ... ; [and] writings on revolution" authored by Asian communists.

== Career Intelligence Medal ==
In early 1977, McGehee, by a recent change in CIA policy, became eligible for early retirement. He took it.

Receiving the Career Intelligence Medal

McGehee was then awarded the CIA's Career Intelligence Medal. "My wife, my four children, one son-in-law, and a grandson all gathered for the awards ceremony." William W. Wells presented the medal to him. McGehee's views on the Agency began with an idealist's appreciation of its principles, when cold war tensions were high. During the second half of his 25 years of service, however, his view of the CIA had markedly declined, until reaching a bitterness. He gave his reasons why he accepted the medal.

I agreed to accept it for three reasons: to give my children an occasion to be proud of their father, not to embarrass Jake [his supervisor at CIA who recommended McGehee for the Medal], and to lend credibility to any criticisms of the Agency I might make in the future. Otherwise, I very much wanted to say, 'Take your medal and shove it.'

The Career Intelligence Medal is awarded by the Central Intelligence Agency for a cumulative record of service which reflects exceptional achievements that substantially contributed to the mission of the Agency.

== Activities after CIA service ==
=== Deadly Deceits ===
In his 1983 book, Deadly Deceits: My 25 Years in the CIA, McGehee recounts his duties as an intelligence agent. For several decades he was assigned to East Asia, performing in the field and at CIA stations in Japan, the Philippines, Taiwan, Thailand, and Vietnam. Details of the practices and techniques of a CIA case officer are given. He shows how he gradually changed his opinion of the Agency. He arrived at the view that CIA operations in many cases damage the people affected, and overall results are often negative for America, its allies, or the world. CIA intelligence can be altered or pitched so that political purposes frequently trump the accurate transmission of information. Alexander Cockburn and Jeffrey St. Clair praised it as "one of the outstanding books written by former CIA agents". The book was reissued in 1999 with updates, and reprinted in 2015 with a foreword by David MacMichael, a former CIA analyst.

The 1983 book proceeds in a chronological fashion. It describes his first-hand experiences and his contemporaneous reflections. Yet there are several exceptions, lengthy digressions inserted into the narrative. These provide the reader with information from McGehee's subsequent research, research done often many years after. The inserts are not easy to distinguish from the narrative text by just flipping through the book. Among them are: CIA activities in the 1950s, pp. 22–31; CIA activities in the 1960s, pp. 56–63; America in the Vietnam conflict (from the French to 1968), pp. 128–141. Three other long inserts are of a somewhat different nature: American counterinsurgency activities in Thailand, pp. 165–172; planting news, politicized intelligence, Asian communism, and Congress investigating the CIA, pp. 185–190; and his critical summary regarding the CIA, pp. 192–195.

His last chapter "Conclusion" is a critical summary of his views on the CIA. It begins with a sharp attack on the Agency he came to know by his 25 years on the job, and by his later research. The CIA's chief purpose "is not now nor has it ever been" to gather intelligence, McGehee argues, but to engineer results by clandestine means. "It is the covert action arm of the President's foreign policy advisers." In this context, whatever information it advances is calculated to support its political objectives. A Cold War, anti-communist agenda, in short, has repurposed its intelligence function. If its content was not thus nefariously politicized, the CIA would view differently the third world, where angry peoples are not lackeys of communist subversion, but peoples whose egalitarian defiance motivates their own struggles. Instead of such clarity, the CIA's intelligence product misinforms. Accordingly, the CIA backs a United States which often supports a privileged local strata whose rule works to abuse and impoverish the majority of its subject people. He describes the CIA's operational malfeasance in Vietnam, El Salvador, Iran, Nicaragua, Laos, Indonesia, Libya. McGehee recommends that the CIA be abolished, and a new intelligence agency created, free of links to covert operations. A separate Agency that acts clandestinely may be necessary, but not favored. For reason stated in his book, McGehee has reversed many of his original 'gung ho' views.

Deadly Deceits has some peculiarities. CIA policy required its personnel to sign a contract stipulating CIA pre-publication approval for writings about their Agency experience. McGehee makes the case that CIA's review was meant to harass, and to delay or stonewall publication, not protect secrets. By persistence he eventually got around CIA objections, yet: deleted passages are marked, occurring throughout the book as published; aliases are used for most people (listed in the index with quotation marks); and McGehee, because he himself could not mention certain facts based on his own experience due to CIA claims that such were still classified, quotes from published books to convey the same or similar material. The CIA's tactics did delay publication. Among books written by former CIA, it was "the last of the major exposés of the era."

=== Articles and speeches ===
After leaving the CIA, McGehee brought to the public his highly critical views, based on his experience. He discussed and illustrated how the CIA's covert actions and interventionist policies can produce unfavorable outcomes. His articles on CIA activities have appeared in The Washington Post, The Nation, The Progressive, Harper's Magazine and Gannet News Service, among others. He also developed CIABASE, a website containing information on events, people, and programs concerning the CIA or American intelligence, including links to other texts available to the public.

Tribunal on CIA Operations

McGehee, as an advocate of reform, was invited to speak at political events, rallies, and at colleges and universities. He gave interviews to the press, television, and other media.

== Controversies ==
He discussed his time spent in South Vietnam and claimed that the CIA supported anti-Communist counterinsurgency in the Philippines.

A downside of his book, Deadly Deceits, was McGehee's personal knowledge of the extent to which the famed physician, Thomas Anthony Dooley III, was involved in CIA warfare across Indochina. This included awareness that the atrocities alleged in the 1956 best seller, Deliver Us From Evil, were fabricated for the beginning of a psywar campaign (later revealed by the Church Committee in 1975).

A 1981 allegation by McGehee about CIA involvement in the Indonesian killings of 1965–1966 was censored by the CIA, prompting the American Civil Liberties Union to sue on his behalf. The CIA prevailed. McGehee described the terror of Suharto's takeover in 1965–66 as "the model operation" for the US-backed coup that got rid of Salvador Allende in Chile seven years later: "The CIA forged a document purporting to reveal a leftist plot to murder Chilean military leaders, just like what happened in Indonesia in 1965."

In 1999, he also filed a Freedom of Information request, claiming that he had been harassed since 1993, suspected to be because of his criticisms. Asking for a halt of the actions, he sent a letter to the president of the United States, the director of the CIA, and his town council, documenting many of the incidents. He asserted his intention to pursue the issue through the FOIA process because of receiving no response to earlier letters.

== Death ==
McGehee died from COVID-19 in Falmouth, Maine, on May 2, 2020, during the COVID-19 pandemic in Maine. He was 92.

== Quote ==
The CIA is not now nor has it ever been a central intelligence agency. It is the covert action arm of the President's foreign policy advisers. In that capacity it overthrows or supports foreign governments while reporting "intelligence" justifying those activities. It shapes its intelligence, even in such critical areas as Soviet nuclear weapon capability, to support presidential policy. Disinformation is a large part of its covert action responsibility, and the American people are the primary target audience of its lies.

== Selected publications ==
External audio
- Interview with Studs Terkel (May 11, 1983). Chicago History Museum. "Discussing the book Deadly Deceits: My Twenty Five Years in the CIA with the author Ralph McGehee."

Books

- Deadly Deceits: My 25 Years in the CIA (1983). New York: Sheridan Square Publications. ISBN 978-0940380035.

Articles

- "Foreign Policy by Forgery: The CIA and the White Paper on El Salvador" (April 11, 1981). The Nation, pp. 423–425.
- "Should the U.S. Fight Secret Wars?" (September 1984). Harper's Magazine.

A forum featuring William Colby, John Stockwell, Angelo Codevilla, George W. Ball, Morton Halperin, Leslie Gelb and Ray S. Cline. Moderated by Daniel Patrick Moynihan.

- "Letters" (December 1984). Harper's Magazine, vol. 269, pp. 4–5, 73–76.

== See also ==
- Church Committee, 1975 U. S. Senate investigations of intelligence activities
- CIA activities in Vietnam, 1945–1972
- Directorate of Operations (CIA), the Clandestine Service
- United States and state terrorism, allegations and critiques
- Philip Agee, author, former CIA case officer in Mexico and Ecuador
- Robert Baer, author, former CIA case officer in Middle East
- Peer de Silva, author, former CIA Chief of Station in East Asia
- Richard Helms, author, former Director of CIA
- Victor Marchetti, author, special assistant to Helms
- Ray McGovern, former CIA senior analyst and national security adviser
- John R. Stockwell, author and former CIA case officer in Vietnam and Africa
- Peter Wright, author, principal scientific officer for MI5
