= Victor Marchetti =

American intelligence agent and author (1929–2018)

Victor Leo Marchetti Jr
- Born: December 23, 1929; Hazleton, Pennsylvania
- Died: October 19, 2018 (aged 88)

Victor Leo Marchetti Jr. (December 23, 1929 – October 19, 2018) was a special assistant to the Deputy Director of the Central Intelligence Agency who later became a prominent critic of the United States Intelligence Community and the Israel lobby in the United States.

== Early life and background ==
Marchetti was born in Hazleton, Pennsylvania. From 1951 to 1953, he served as a corporal in U.S. Army Intelligence in France and Germany. Returning to the United States after his military service, he enrolled in Pennsylvania State University, where he majored in Russian area studies, graduating with a bachelor's degree in history in 1955.

== CIA career ==
External audio
- "Looking at the CIA." Interview by Tim McGovern. KPFK (April 27, 1974). Los Angeles: Pacifica Radio Archives. PRA BC2043.
- "Intelligence Service." Interview by Tim McGovern. KPFK (1977). Los Angeles: Pacifica Radio Archives. PRA KZ0390.

After a few months working as an analyst at the National Security Agency, Marchetti joined the CIA in October 1955. He began his career as an analyst in the Office of Research and Reports, eventually serving a tour of duty in the Office of National Estimates (ONE).

From ONE, Marchetti moved to the Office of Planning, Programming, and Budgeting in 1966, where he worked for over two years. Beginning in July 1968, he served for nine months as special assistant to CIA Deputy Director Rufus Taylor. His final position in the Agency was on the Planning, Programming, and Budget Staff of the National Photographic Interpretation Center. Among other projects with which he was involved, Marchetti worked on setting up the Pine Gap satellite ground station near Alice Springs in Central Australia.

In September 1969, Marchetti resigned from the CIA.

== Writing career ==
After leaving the CIA, Marchetti began a writing career. His first work was a novel, The Rope-Dancer, published in 1971. The plot involves an officer in the "National Intelligence Agency" who becomes a spy for the Soviet Union. In a 2004 article for American Intelligence Journal, Jon Wiant, career member of the Department of State's Senior Executive Service and a faculty member of the Joint Military Intelligence College, reported a 1991 conversation with retired KGB General Oleg Kalugin in which the latter told him that Rope Dancer is assigned as required reading for every KGB officer assigned to the United States. Kalugin believed the novel was an excellent primer in American counterintelligence doctrine.

External audio
- "The CIA and Dirty Tricks." Interview by Robert Kuttner on WBAI (February 21, 1972). Los Angeles: Pacifica Radio Archives, with CovertAction Magazine.
- The Internal Danger: Uncovering Covert CIA Activities (1975), with William Colby, John D. Marks, Bella Abzug, Phillip Agee. Los Angeles: Pacifica Radio Archives. PRA KZ1146.01.

During public appearances promoting the novel, Marchetti announced that he was writing a non-fiction work about the CIA. In March 1972, he completed a draft of an article for Esquire which, according to a later CIA account, included "names of agents, relations with named governments, and identifying details of ongoing operations." The CIA received a copy of the article and decided to seek an injunction against its publication.

The basis for seeking an injunction against Marchetti was the secrecy agreement which he had signed when beginning employment at the CIA. The CIA presented the agreement and the parts of the draft article it considered in violation of the agreement, to Judge Albert V. Bryan, Jr. of the US District Court for Eastern Virginia, who granted a temporary restraining order in April 1972. The case proceeded to trial, at which Bryan found for the CIA and issued a permanent injunction requiring Marchetti to submit his writings to CIA for review prior to publication.

Marchetti appealed the injunction to the Fourth Circuit Court of Appeals, which upheld Bryan's restraint but limited it to classified material. The appeals court also found that Marchetti was entitled to timely review of materials he submitted to the CIA. Marchetti appealed again to the US Supreme Court, but the Court rejected Marchetti's appeal in December 1972.

Marchetti continued work on his book with a co-author, John D. Marks, and signed a book contract with publisher Alfred A. Knopf. In August 1973, they submitted their manuscript to the CIA. After reviewing the manuscript, the Agency responded with a list of 339 passages which it claimed contained classified information and demanded their deletion. Marchetti and Marks rejected the demand and indicated they would go to court in order to print the manuscript as written. The CIA then withdrew its objections to 171 of the items but stood firm on the remaining 168. The trial was held again before Judge Bryan. This time, however, he rejected all but 26 of the deletions requested by the CIA on the grounds that the information in them was not properly or provably classified. The CIA appealed Bryan's ruling, and ultimately the Fourth Circuit Court of Appeals upheld all 168 of the deletions. The book was published by Knopf in 1974 as The CIA and the Cult of Intelligence. It was printed with blanks for deleted passages and boldface type for the 171 deletions which CIA originally requested and later withdrew.

=== Later writing ===
In 1978, Marchetti published an article about the JFK assassination in the far-right newspaper of the antisemitic Liberty Lobby, The Spotlight. Marchetti, a proponent of the organized crime and the CIA conspiracy theory, claimed that the House Select Committee on Assassinations revealed a CIA memo from 1966 that named E. Howard Hunt, Frank Sturgis and Gerry Patrick Hemming in the JFK assassination. Marchetti also claimed that Marita Lorenz offered sworn testimony to confirm this. The HSCA reported that it had not received such a memo and rejected theories that Hunt was involved in a plot to kill Kennedy.

In 1981, Hunt sued the Liberty Lobby and Marchetti for defamation and won $650,000 in damages. Liberty Lobby, represented by attorney Mark Lane, appealed the verdict. On February 1, 1985, Marchetti stated that key parts of his articles were based upon rumors that he heard from Penthouse columnist Bill Corson and that he had no corroboration of Corson's story. Corson had provided an earlier deposition stating that he not discussed the rumors with Marchetti. Marchetti and Liberty Lobby won the appeal in 1985. Commenting afterward, two jurors rejected that the conspiracy theories offered by Lane influenced the verdict. Lane's 1991 book Plausible Denial, develops the claims he presented in the trial.

In 1988 he appeared in an episode of The Kwitny Report discussing the American mafia and Kennedy's assassination. In 1989, Marchetti presented a paper on the CIA at the Ninth International Revisionist Conference held by the Institute for Historical Review (IHR).

Marchetti edited the New American View newsletter, which described its aim as to "document for patriotic Americans... the excess of pro-Israelism, which warps the news we see and hear from our media, cows our Congress into submission, and has already cost us hundreds of innocent, young Americans in Lebanon and elsewhere." He also co-published the Zionist Watch newsletter with Mark Lane, and published ADL and Zionism, by Paul Goldstein and Jeffrey Steinberg, who were both closely associated with the LaRouche movement.

== Personal life and death ==
Marchetti suffered from dementia in his last years. He died at his home in Ashburn, Virginia at the age of 88 on October 19, 2018.

== Filmography ==
- Inside Pine Gap (1997)
- Inside the CIA: On Company Business (1980)
- The JFK Conspiracy: Final Analysis (1992)
- "You Have Used Me as a Fish Long Enough" (Part 2). The Living Dead: Three Films About the Power of the Past (1995). The second major television documentary series by British filmmaker Adam Curtis for the BBC. The series examines the manipulation of history and memory (both national and individual) by politicians and others.
  - Extract of Marchetti discussing Acoustic Kitty. 1 min.

== Publications ==
=== Articles ===
- "CIA: The President's Loyal Tool." The Nation, vol. 214, no. 14 (Apr. 3, 1972), pp. 430–432.
- "Inside the CIA: The Clandestine Mentality," with John D. Marks. Ramparts Magazine (Jul. 1974), pp. 21-25, 48, 50, 52.
- "Twilight of the Spooks." Inquiry (July 10, 1978), pp. 6–8.
- "CIA to Admit Hunt Involvement in Kennedy Slaying." Spotlight (Aug. 14, 1978).
- "How the CIA Views the UFO Phenomenon." Second Look, vol. 1, no. 7 (May 1979), pp. 2–7.

Republished in the Journal of Historical Review, vol. 17, no. 5 (Sep./Oct. 1998), p. 14.

=== Books ===
- The Rope-Dancer. New York: Grosset & Dunlap (1971). ISBN 0448024608, 978-0448024608. OCLC 159470.
- The CIA and the Cult of Intelligence, with John D. Marks. New York: Knopf (1974). ISBN 978-0394482392.

=== Book reviews ===
- "Memoirs of a Frustrated Spook." Review of Decent Interval: An Insider's Account of Saigon's Indecent End Told by the CIA's Chief Strategy Analyst in Vietnam by Frank Snepp. Inquiry (Feb. 6, 1978), pp. 22–24.
- "A Sand Trap for the CIA." Review of Ropes of Sand by Wilbur Crane Eveland. Inquiry (Nov. 10, 1980), pp. 23–24.

Republished: Journal of Historical Review, vol. 14, no. 3 (May-Jun. 1994), p. 43.

=== Interviews ===
- Kondracke, Morton. Penthouse (January 1975).
- Castleman, Michael. "I Was a Spook for the CIA: A Conversation with Victor Marchetti." Ann Arbor Sun, vol. 3, no. 9 (April 25, 1975), pp. 15, 21. JSTOR community.28032710. full issue.
- Interview for episode of The Kwitny Report; "Mafia Involvement in the JFK Assassination?" (1988)
- Interview for The Kennedy Assassinations: Coincidence or Conspiracy? (1992), hosted by Robert Conrad.

=== Newsletters ===
- New American Views (as editor). Washington, D.C. (1988–). OCLC 20463595.

"Monitoring the special relationship between the United States and Israel."

- Zionist Watch (as co-publisher, with Mark Lane).

=== Transcripts ===
- "Propaganda and Disinformation: How the CIA Manufactures History." Presented at the Ninth International Revisionist Conference in Huntington Beach, California, hosted by the Institute for Historical Review (February 1989).

Republished in the Journal of Historical Review, vol. 9, no. 3 (Fall 1989), pp. 305–320.

== See also ==
- Philip Agee, author, former CIA case officer in Mexico and Ecuador
- Robert Baer, author, former CIA case officer in Middle East
- Peer de Silva, author, former CIA Chief of Station in East Asia
- Richard Helms, author, former Director of CIA
- Ray McGovern, former CIA senior analyst and national security adviser
- John R. Stockwell, author and former CIA case officer in Vietnam and Africa
- Ralph McGehee, author, former CIA case officer
- Peter Wright, author, principal scientific officer for MI5
