= 1977 Libertarian National Convention =

United States political event

Convention
- Date(s): July 12–17, 1977
- City: San Francisco, California
- Venue: Sheraton-Palace Hotel

Turning Point – 1977, the 1977 Libertarian Party National Convention was held at the Sheraton-Palace Hotel in San Francisco between July 12 and 17, 1977. It had more than 50 events and an estimated attendance of 1500 people.

== Event ==
A march across the room was organized by a group of libertarian feminists in support of the Equal Rights Amendment; the March featured a few of the leading women in the movement and two men: Robert Anton Wilson and Steve Trinward.

== Staff and committees ==
Walter Grinder, platform committee chair

== Changes ==
- The Executive Committee was renamed the National Committee
- The maximum number of regions was increased from 8 to 10

== Speakers, panelists, and honorees ==
External audio
- John D. Marks delivers a speech at the 1977 conference. via Plutopia News Network.

- Linda Abrams
- David Bergland
- Nathaniel Branden, Objectivist leader
- Karl Bray, tax activist
- Jim Eason, radio talk show host
- John Hospers
- Diane Hunter-Smith
- Ann Jackson
- Paul Krassner, editor of The Realist
- Dr. Timothy Leary, 1960s Guru
- Roger MacBride, 1976 presidential nominee
- John D. Marks, co-author of The CIA and the Cult of Intelligence
- Eugene McCarthy, independent presidential candidate and opponent of MacBride in 1976
- Tonie Nathan, 1972 vice presidential candidate
- David Nolan (libertarian), party founder
- Ron Paul, former U.S. Congressman
- Sharon Pressley
- Earl Ravanel, unofficial shadow Secretary of State
- Murray Rothbard, keynote speaker
- Margo St James, chair of COYOTE
- Robert Anton Wilson, author

== LNC ==
- David Bergland, chair
- Mary Louise Hanson, vice chair
- Sylvia Sanders, secretary
- Paul Allen, treasurer
- Ed Clark, at large
- Carol Cunningham, at large
- Eric Garris, at large
- John Hildberg, at large
- Charles Koch, at large
- Dick Randolph, at large
- Murray Rothbard, at large
- Bill Evers, regional representative
- RA Childs, Jr., region 9
- Michael Fieschko, region 9 (alt?)

== Other noted events ==
- William Westminster distributed a pamphlet entitled "On Account of Tyranny"
- The IRA initially had a table, but was asked to leave after their $10 literature table fee was refunded. Their table had been singled out by a speech by David Nolan.
- Aron Kay, pie-throwing Yippie, was present on a mission to pie Timothy Leary

== Bibliography ==
- "National Convention 1977." LPedia.
- Against the Wall (newsletter), vol. 5, no. 10.
- "Libertarian Party National Convention – San Francisco, July 14–17, 1977." Libertarian Party.

Two typewritten pages containing the text of two resolutions adopted at the 1977: a condemnation of singer Anita Bryant's anti-gay campaign, and of the Briggs Initiative, a California proposition to bar homosexuals from working in public schools.

- Palmer, Tom G., with Tom Avery. "The 1977 Libertarian Party National Convention." Libertarianism.com (October 1977).
- Times-Post Service. "Libertarian Coalition Made Up of Odds, Ends." Salinas Californian (July 15, 1977), p. 34.
- Staff writer. "Liberatarians [sic] Adopt 'Plank.'" Santa Cruz Sentinel (July 21, 1977), p. 8.
