= Viet Cong order of battle controversy =

The order of battle for the Viet Cong was a contested American intelligence issue during the Vietnam War. Arising in the mid-1960s, its focus was the count of enemy combatants. Often called the order of battle controversy, the debate came to divide the Central Intelligence Agency (CIA) and challenge military intelligence. The politics and strategy of the war also became involved in the debate.

Insignia patch for MACV

Order of battle (O/B) is a military term for a description of the strength of an armed force, its composition and particulars. A key factor is the total number involved. Here the count was of communist forces in South Vietnam. While then chiefly the Viet Cong (VC), it also included forces coming from North Vietnam: the People's Army of Viet Nam (PAVN). This article addresses the order of battle (O/B) not for any single engagement of the war, but rather for the overall strength of communist forces in South Vietnam at the time, e.g., 1967.

Determining the O/B number for VC and PAVN forces was complicated by the wide range of personnel involved, especially among VC. There were trained and equipped 'regular soldiers', but also other forces, e.g., rural militias, many part-time, with various or little training and weapons. In addition were politically organized support groups of civilians, some full-time, highly trained party cadres, often collectively called by American intelligence the Viet Cong Infrastructure (VCI).

The American Military Assistance Command, Vietnam (MACV) was established in 1962. MACV intelligence provided reports on the enemy O/B. A few years later the CIA, too, began to study the VC. A dispute then arose as to the number of enemy forces, because the CIA had arrived at significantly higher figures than MACV.

During 1967 this controversy became widely known in American intelligence. It held important implications for how the Vietnam War was described to the American people, the prospects for victory. When the year's Special National Intelligence Estimate for Vietnam (SNIE 14-3-67) was prepared, it became difficult to reconcile the competing number estimates for VC. Charges were made, e.g., by Sam Adams an analyst for the CIA, that MACV's low numbers were the result of political interference with the data of intelligence work. Later that year the controversy was resolved in favor of the lower numbers which MACV had forcefully and persistently asserted.

In January 1968, communist forces dramatically changed their low-profile strategy: they brazenly attacked many cities and other targets across South Vietnam. Their Tet Offensive surprised South Vietnamese and American military forces, and only after heavy fighting were they able to defeat the attackers. Although eventually a major military victory for the US and its allies, in the end it proved to be a great political victory for the communist cause. Shortly after, President Lyndon Johnson withdrew from reelection to the Presidency. The war became increasingly unpopular with American voters after their surprise and shock at the magnitude and intensity of the VC offensive.

As a result of Tet, the American intelligence community significantly adjusted the O/B to reflect the CIA's higher numbers. The O/B controversy then quietly lost much of its importance. The issues, however, resurfaced in 1982 because of a CBS television documentary followed by a civil trial for libel, Westmoreland v. CBS.

== Order of battle controversy ==
At its foundation, the American O/B controversy derived from the appraisal by analysts of a foreign enemy's ability to field combatants. Its wider effect involved a host of issues: the entire war in Southeast Asia and domestic public opinion, the politics of military intelligence and the utility of combat/support formations, presidential electioneering confronting an intelligence estimate suggested by the CIA.

Magnifying its importance in the mid-1960s was the metrics of the American strategy of attrition in South Vietnam. Complicating its resolution were the conflicting perspectives of the institutional players, in the year before the U.S. presidential election. The O/B controversy came to an unexpected denouement, however, as a result of a failed military offensive by the VC that nonetheless reaped their cause significant political rewards.

=== Attrition strategy, cross-over ===
The Johnson Administration and the US Army, particularly Military Assistance Command, Vietnam (MACV), in consultation arrived at their chosen Vietnam strategy, basically a war of attrition. In early 1966 this strategy was made explicit in a writing to General William Westmoreland, then commander of American forces in Vietnam. A narrative derived from the strategy worked to coordinate both the military's explanation of the war, and the President's special care to maintain voter support for it. Instead of territory taken as shown on a map, or a series of enemy retreats or surrenders, the attrition narrative demonstrated progress in the war by the steady destruction of enemy forces.

In a war of attrition a grim victory went to the army that more quickly reduced the size of its opponent. Hence, the importance of search and destroy missions and of body counts, which affected the O/B numbers. A significant benchmark of success was the cross-over point, achieved when the prevailing army wears down an enemy until he begins to suffer casualties at a rate higher than he can replace. This carnage allows the expectant victor to see "light at the end of the tunnel". The war ends, eventually, when the losing side can no longer field sufficient forces to sustain the fight. Yet the metrics of replacement, from existing reserves, new recruitment, or infiltration from outside, were debatable.

For President Johnson, favorable changes in the O/B numbers for the VC, such as reduction in the number of their main force, would directly indicate the war's progress. American combat forces were introduced in 1965. Their numbers were steadily augmented until reaching over half a million troops. Military doctrines generally had required a ten to one advantage to defeat a guerrilla 'people's army'. Yet because American technology provided better mobility (e.g., helicopters) and increased firepower in weaponry, a mere three to one ratio was thought sufficient. General Westmoreland mentioned the possibility of reaching a cross-over point ahead.

A war of attrition was one of several conventional military approaches. Yet in Vietnam a revolutionary situation existed, a civil war whose combatants were not only regular soldiers but also part-time guerrillas who were civilians by day. The fighting was largely without borders as control of much of the country was openly contested. A conventional conquest of territory was seldom an option. The 'search and destroy' operation, a tactic used by American forces to attrit the enemy, was difficult as the VC resisted detection; merely finding such an elusive enemy was a major problem.

An entirely different approach was counterinsurgency, a strategy in which protection (pacification) of the population was a prime objective. After the 1968 Tet Offensive, this latter approach was given much more emphasis. In the meantime, for the American military in the mid-1960s, attrition strategy generally governed the way the war was fought.

=== Institutional context ===
The O/B controversy attracted the interests of powerful institutions in the federal government. In such a climate, an intelligence agency became vulnerable to pressures tending to influence, or compromise, its finished product. Consequently, the intelligence community as a whole, including military intelligence and the CIA in particular, had to chart a course through a maze of national policy, administration agendas, demanding politicians and generals, the evidenced probabilities and their professional mandate.

President Johnson sought popular support for the Vietnam War. He spoke of the struggle's necessity, and assured the American people that the nation would prevail. Always he welcomed news of the progress of American arms, specifically, news of a steady decline in the number of enemy combatants, which fit the established politico-military narrative toward victory. For several years the Army released falling numbers suggesting such progress, based on the attrition strategy. Starting in early 1966, however, the CIA, as well as some analysts at military intelligence, began discussing evidence indicating that the number of enemy combatants was much larger than earlier thought.

The American military takes its orders from the civilian administration, specifically from the President as Commander-in-Chief, who may act through the Secretary of Defense. The administration also influences military's strategy, operations, officer assignments, and (along with Congress) the military's budget. A harmony of interests between the President and the Joint Chiefs of Staff serves the nation. In the extreme, the success or failure of a President's foreign policy can depend on the military's victory or defeat in war. In Vietnam the Army generals encountered unexpected difficulties, e.g., because the local politics of the struggle seemed to favor the native communists and because of the unexpected ability of VC to avoid detection and escape engagement. Eventually, as the war continued, American domestic political support began to erode.

During this period the Charter of the Central Intelligence Agency (CIA) gave the agency two major intelligence tasks: (i) production of intelligence for the President and his administration, its primary consumers; and, (ii) coordinating the other intelligence agencies of the federal government in order to produce coherent intelligence findings. The largest component of the American intelligence community, however, was the several military intelligence services. The task of coordinating the intelligence community would result in a yearly National Intelligence Estimate (NIE). Regarding the first task, the CIA had been for years providing the President with intelligence reports that were generally pessimistic on the Vietnam War, often with the assent of military intelligence. President Johnson, however, had chosen to disregard much of the CIA's negative assessments.

=== Recounting the Viet Cong ===
The O/B here concerns not only the VC, but the VC combined with the People's Army of Vietnam (PAVN) who had begun infiltrating from the north. Combined they formed the overall communist fighting forces and auxiliaries, largely under a unity of command, active in South Vietnam. They were the subject of an ongoing debate within American intelligence, specifically, MACV and the civilian CIA sharply differed in their O/B appraisals of the VC.

==== Composition of forces ====
A complicating factor for an O/B was the composition of the VC and the PAVN. Regularly uniformed, 'conventional' soldiers were often called (in the parlance of the American military in Vietnam) 'main force' units. The majority of PAVN units were such, but only a disputed fraction of VC units were 'main force'. Troop designations used by the military might conform more to the geographic extent of their organization and command, e.g., provisional units (usually deemed soldiers) and local units (according to some: not so deemed, hence not to be counted).

The vocabulary used to designate the different kinds of VC personnel was itself somewhat problematical. Not only are the terms taken from Vietnamese, French and English, but even in English, the terms used in a technical sense are often not consistent. A few different words may be used to describe the same kind of VC combatant, while a single word may designate different kinds. The terms may overlap in different ways, or be combined in different ways, apparently depending on the author, or the agency, or the locale, or the time period. The term 'combat guerrilla' may be understood as quite similar to conventional soldiers of a 'main force' unit. Yet 'guerrilla-militias' may signify part-time, ill-armed, poorly trained forces, which may even be deemed outside an O/B limited to combatants, and hence not counted.

A recurrent issue was whether to count varieties of supporting forces. These could be differently equipped, or differently trained. They could be soldiers in training, or villagers who might fight or participate only part-time. Predominantly civilian VC were involved in combat support activity. Such positions included the political leaders, administrators, tax collectors, teachers, medical personnel, engineers, mechanics, etc. They were often designated as Viet Cong Infrastructure (VCI). Who should be counted in an O/B? "A characteristic of a guerrilla war is that the government side never knows how many of the enemy it faces." Or even who, as "every Vietnamese who passes in the street could be a guerrilla".

==== ARVN and MACV: O/B to 1966 ====
The Army of the Republic of Vietnam (ARVN) kept records of the opposing communist forces it faced within the borders of South Vietnam. These forces included the 'liberation army' directed by the VC, which first became active in the late 1950s and the PAVN, the army of its northern sponsor.

The nucleus of VC forces consisted of returning communist cadre from North Vietnam. In 1954 this cadre had evacuated to the north after the Geneva Accords ending the First Indochina War. Also involved were "stay behind" communist cadre, and others who wanted an armed revolution to overthrow the government of South Vietnamese (GSV). The VC were successful in recruiting local people into their ranks. Communications were maintained with the North, which sent it additional cadre, army personnel and equipment.

ARVN J-2 (military intelligence) discovered "a steady rise in VC strength levels". The American advisors of MAAG Vietnam were familiar with ARVN J-2 records, but "this unfavorable trend had not appeared in MAAG reporting" because in 1960 it had "no intelligence shop". Initial CIA "efforts to fill this gap were constrained by the limited volume and reliability of Vietnamese police reporting [CIA's chief source] about VC activity and about local communist military and political order of battle".

In 1965 American combat troops landed in South Vietnam; thereafter, MACV assumed the duties of MAAG Vietnam. The O/B numbers for the communist forces were kept, and work done for MACV's own compilation of the enemy's strength and composition, but apparently the VC O/B were not regularly updated using new reports from the field.

In 1965 the CIA assigned an analyst, Sam Adams, to investigate VC motivation and morale. Changing rates of defections and desertion from the VC, and the numbers involved, led him to inquire about the overall VC O/B. He found that MACV was then estimating the combined strength of the VC and PAVN at 280,000.

==== CIA: VC O/B new numbers ====
Adams, a CIA mid-level analyst, discovered what appeared to be a large gap between MACV O/B numbers and the actual count of VC in the field. Adams relied on multiple sources of information, including his own interviews with ARVN military officers, and GSV records on the conflict, especially files from its Chieu Hoi program which focused on defectors from the VC. Adams also used CIA data derived directly from American MACV and its J-2 (military intelligence), which contained translations of captured documents, of interrogations with enemy POWs, and intercepts, as well as photo-reconnaissance. Key to his research had been his latter organization of the data and its sorting onto file cards. Then he could more easily cross-reference and, if warranted, extrapolate.

Careful examination of MACV and South Vietnamese records indicated unexplained contradictions. He evidently had a 'moment of discovery' in his back office at CIA HQ in Virginia, where he did most of his work. As a result, he concluded that the number of VC was more likely at least twice what was then considered accurate. Some MACV intelligence officers quickly agreed to his higher numbers. Other MACV officials, however, refused to acknowledge his findings. Although the majority of CIA analysts who studied the matter agreed, CIA as an agency at first remained uncommitted.

The reception of his findings began to become a contentious issue at CIA. Adams suspected that the intelligence he presented was being politically tainted, i.e., intentionally misinterpreted to conform to a government agenda. As an institution MACV registered its disapproval of his reports with higher numbers of VC and PAVN. The discussions did not reach consensus. Adams' opinion hardened into the view that the intelligence was being doctored, certainly to accommodate the generals who ran MACV, and probably the political advisors whose opinions prevailed in the Johnson administration. These Johnson officials were the primary consumers of the CIA's intelligence reports. More abstractly put, the political primacy of 'domestic affairs' in achieving, or at least in explaining, the military strategy in Vietnam, necessitated that certain intelligence findings be available to facilitate continuance of set policies.

Yet the independent streak in Adams made him a problematic political operative. His persistence, however, eventually led him beyond the CIA, and resulted in media activity, his magazine article, his trial testimony and appearance before Congress.

==== Split within CIA ====
The issue as it arose thus had several components, simplified as: a) the existing war narrative, b) the prior numbers broadcast to the public, and c) what type of combatants were included in the count. In 1966 in South Vietnam, that would be: a) a war of attrition, b) about [200,000], and c) conventional and guerrilla, excluding the other categories. The Army had been counting primarily only PAVN, and VC conventional and combat guerrilla forces.

In part, this was due to the Army's established doctrine in which it viewed the struggle in more conventional terms, rather than as a revolutionary insurgency fighting a political war. A people's struggle would be half political and would include sometimes quite different tactics and strategies. Institutional context and political relevance of the controversy had its military consequences, its political tones. [Under construction].

=== Johnson: politics of war in 1967 ===
As Commander-in-Chief, the American President directs the nation's armed forces. President Johnson, in holding a democratically elected public office, was ultimately dependent upon the popular vote for political support, and on political forces at play. As a national figure, his well-known profile was in domestic policy, not in foreign policy. His main focus was expressly oriented toward American society, specifically to a package of progressive 'Great Society' programs to further his view of economic and racial justice. Johnson's political agenda was center-left. The liberal Democratic Party was his career affiliation. Rather than the Vietnam War, he preferred to first pursue to completion his administration's domestic goals.

Nonetheless, Johnson planned to satisfy as well the conservative strata of the electorate, by stopping communism in South Vietnam. To do so, Johnson relied on the military chiefs and continued to send military advisors to South Vietnam. In the early 1960s, the US Army was more focused on conventional warfare, apt for fighting the Red Army in Europe, or re-fighting the Korean War, than in tangling with elusive communist guerrillas in a political struggle in Southeast Asia.

Johnson, in his ambitious plan to satisfy different constituencies with different goals, was obliged to pursue a 'guns and butter' program, which would break the budget. His critics began to find contradictions in his pronouncements, especially after his 1964 election as an anti-war candidate was followed by his 1965 escalation of the war in South Vietnam. His stories about the situation and strategy in South Vietnam began to seem arbitrary, politicized. A "credibility gap" emerged in the press and in public opinion.

In preparation for the 1968 Presidential election, Johnson decided to mount a public relations campaign in 1967. A favorable image of American forces and prospects in the Vietnam War would be promoted to court American voters, who were becoming divided about the conflict. For this 'PR' campaign, Johnson enlisted General Westmoreland, his military commander in Vietnam, to make the pro-war case. The General returned to Washington several times. He addressed Congress, held press conferences, and appeared on television news programs responding to questions about the war. The new American ambassador in Saigon, Ellsworth Bunker, arrived later in Washington, to support the campaign, the General and the war.

"During the coming year [1968], the president was expected to seek reelection, which increased the likelihood that the presidential campaign would become a referendum on American policy in Vietnam. An antiwar wing developed in the Democratic Party... . Johnson's immediate goal was to convince the American public and press that the war was being won, and he launched a public relations campaign to counteract... the media that the war was deadlocked. As part of that effort both Bunker and Westmoreland returned to Washington in November [1967] and spoke before the U. S. Congress, reassuring the public and the legislature that the allies were winning the war. Westmoreland promised success... . ... American officials expressed confidence that the enemy was being worn down."

Johnson's campaign was effective in that subsequent opinion polls showed a general increase in public approval of the war. The "light at the end of the tunnel" was said to be coming into view. Yet opposition to the war appeared resilient as demonstrations continued to criticize Johnson and his war policies.

=== MACV and CIA's Estimate ===
==== MACV: Failure to reconcile ====
Some members MACV's J-2 intelligence staff were originally receptive to the new O/B numbers published by the CIA. Yet the more senior officers up the chain of command firmly resisted to lower numbers for VC and PAVN. As the dispute intensified, the question arose about which institution had priority for determining O/B issues: MACV whose officers commanded the soldiers and auxiliaries in the field doing the fighting, or the civilian analysts in Washington.

Although raising factual questions, MACV ultimately depended on an asserted "command position" to convince the CIA to conform to its lower numbers. The "command position" signified its direct responsibility for military planning and deployment decisions based on O/B numbers and issues. Yet it also hinted at, or camouflaged, the institutional context of the military: MACV was a major instrument of the Johnson Administration's foreign policy.

==== CIA's SNIE 14.3-67: Helms ====
The Special National Intelligence Estimate SNIE 14.3-67 went through 22 drafts during 1967. It was entitled Capabilities for the Vietnamese Communists for fighting in South Vietnam.

DCI Richard Helms knew that the President could choose to leave him out of the inner circle, as he had the former DCI John McCone in 1964. Moreover, President Johnson was informed of the intelligence debate about the order of battle for the VC, of the dispute over the numbers, of the more likely probability of higher numbers. Accordingly, an SNIE that stated lower numbers for the VC, all things considered, would not be misinforming the President. Helms, too, considered that the Army was doing the fighting, the killing and the dying; it was their call to make. Additionally, Helms did not want to alienate military intelligence because he wanted their cooperation on an issue currently outstanding: the bombing of North Vietnam, which the CIA from the start generally considered as a poor, ineffective tactic, one that should be halted. Helms, consequently, considered the advisability of weighing his decision in terms of bureaucratic issues that transcended the O/B issues at stake.

==== Saigon conference: Carver ====
MACV stuck with its lower numbers. The issue became the subject of extensive negotiations, chiefly between the MACV and the CIA, which dragged on all summer and attracted an unwanted notoriety. Although many military analysts had earlier concurred with the higher numbers proposed by CIA, many later fell silent. The lower numbers were pushed. MACV defended its "command position" stance, imposed by military leaders in Vietnam, due to political and strategic considerations sourced in Washington.

Late in 1967, a conference was called to be held in Saigon. It was intended to finally bring to an end the long-standing controversy. The CIA was represented by George Carver, the DCI's Special Assistant for Vietnam Affairs (SAVA). Here negotiations were renewed with the military regarding the VC and PAVN combatant figures for the CIA's 1967 SNIE. DCI Helms then allowed or instructed Carver to agree to MACV's lower numbers.

==== Dissent by analyst Adams ====
Adams responded with an internal memorandum calling the CIA agreement with MACV "a monument of deceit." He sketched out a point of view which related the agreement to a conspiracy between the Washington institutions, both civilian and military, which compromised the integrity of the intelligence, for the sake of a hidden agenda driven by politics. Adams, frustrated with a perversion of intelligence to meet political objectives, struggled to get levers pulled by those above him at CIA. Ultimately, his challenge to DCI Helms failed. He retained a strong belief that political pressures by the military or by those who directed the military resulted in the 1967 SNIE's depiction of the PAVN and VC as weaker than they actually were.

== Tet: winners and losers ==
A smaller VC force could not have mounted Tet Offensive. Hanoi believed 300-400,000 VC would rise up and swamp the half-strength ARVN and then the fence-sitters would join the communists in destroying the South Vietnamese regime. Less than 1/4 of the communists on the paperwork Sam Adams used took part in Tet. The disagreements were never about main force or district guerillas. The disagreement was always about the number of part-time guerillas. In January 1968, after the Tet Offensive, the CIA adopted a much higher enemy count along the lines the analyst Sam Adams had recommended.

Although in the end, Tet was a disastrous military defeat for the VC, it also became a collateral propaganda victory. Unexpectedly, it seemed a knock-out blow against the campaign of U.S. President Lyndon Johnson, as shortly after he announced his decision not to seek reelection. With his growing credibility gap, and changing stories, it was no longer possible for Johnson to pull the strings on the politico-military narrative.

Accordingly, the next NIE would be recalibrated to show higher numbers, to accord more with Adams. Yet the whole O/B controversy was rendered somewhat obsolete, as the raison d'être for the fudged numbers no longer existed. Johnson did not need intelligence reports to cover for his explanation to the American public about the desired 'progress' in the war. Already it was game over for him in the 1968 elections. Johnson had only the remainder of 1968 to remedy with peace negotiations his record.

Yet this result did not satisfy Sam Adams. He apparently wanted somehow to make a permanent institutional fix that would prevent future political manipulation of intelligence. Such problems, however, seem perennial, e.g., WMD in the Iraq War, 2002–2003.

== Aftermath ==
After the Tet Offensive the O/B controversy subsided. President Johnson announced he would not run for reelection. General Westmoreland was rotated out of the Vietnam War. The O/B numbers were recalibrated upward. The American political and military landscaped had changed. Yet, although Sam Adams had resigned from the CIA in 1973, he did not stop pushing the issue of tainted intelligence. In 1975 the war itself came to an end.

=== 1982 documentary ===
In large part due to the persistence of Adams troubling issues about the above institutional conflicts over military intelligence remained in the public discussion about Vietnam. In 1982 CBS aired a documentary about it, largely favorable to Adams, called The Uncounted Enemy. This TV program eventually prompted Westmoreland to file of a legal action for libel, Westmoreland v. CBS.

== Bibliography ==
Books

- Sam Adams, War of Numbers: An Intelligence Memoir (South Royalton, VT: Steerforth Press, 1994). ISBN 9781883642235
- Thomas L. Ahern, Vietnam Declassified. The CIA and counterinsurgency (University of Kentucky 2010, 2012).
- George W. Allen, None So Blind. A personal account of the intelligence failure in Vietnam (Chicago: Ivan R. Dee 2001).
- Bob Brewin & Sydney Shaw, Vietnam on Trial. Westmoreland vs. CBS (New York: Athenaum 1987).
- Bui Diem, In the Jaws of History (Boston: Houghton, Mifflin 1987).
- Robert Dallek, Flawed Giant: Lyndon Johnson and his times (Oxford University 1998).
- Dennis J. Duncanson, Government and Revolution in Vietnam (Oxford University 1968).
- Daniel Ellsberg, Secrets. A memoir of Vietnam and the Pentagon Papers (New York: Viking Penguin 2002, 2003).
- Harold P. Ford, CIA and the Vietnam Policymakers: Three episodes 1962–1968 (CIA: Center for the Study of Intelligence 1998).
- Richard Helms, A Look over my Shoulder. A life in the Central Intelligence Agency (New York: Random House 2003).
- C. Michael Hiam, Who the Hell Are We Fighting? The Story of Sam Adams... (Hanover: Steerforth 2006).
- Richard A. Hunt, Pacification. The American struggle for Vietnam's hearts and minds (Boulder: Westview 1995).
- Richard H. Immerman, The Hidden Hand. A brief history of the CIA (Chichester: Wiley Blackwell 2014).
- Rhodri Jeffreys-Jones, The CIA and American Democracy (Yale University 1989).
- Stanley Karnow, Vietnam. A History. The first complete account of Vietnam at war (New York: Viking 1983).
- Andrew F. Krepinevich, The Army and Vietnam (Johns Hopkins University 1986).
- Ralph McGehee, Deadly Deceits. My 25 years in the CIA (New York: Sheriden Square 1983).
- H. R. McMaster, Dereliction of Duty (New York: HarperCollins 1997, HarperPerennial 1998).
- Robert S. McNamara, In Retrospect. The tragedy and lessons of Vietnam (New York: Times Books 1995).
- Douglas Pike, Viet Cong. The organization and techniques of the National Liberation Front of Vietnam (M.I.T. 1966).
- Thomas Powers, The Man who kept the Secrets. Richard Helms and the CIA (New York: Alfred A. Knopf 1979).
- John Prados, Vietnam. The history of an unwindable war, 1945–1975 (University of Kansas 2009).
- John Ranelagh, The Agency. The rise and decline of the CIA (New York: Simon and Schuster 1986).
- Neil Sheehan, A Bright Shining Lie (New York: Random House 1988).
- Harry G. Summers, Jr., On Strategy: The Vietnam war in context (Carlisle Barracks: Strategic Studies Institute [1981]).
- Tran Ngoc Chau, Vietnam Labyrinth (Lubbock: Texas Tech University 2012).
- Tim Weiner, Legacy of Ashes. The history of the CIA (New York: Doubleday 2007).
- William C. Westmoreland, A Soldier Reports (New York: Doubleday 1976).
  - Athan Theoharis, editor, The Central Intelligence Agency. Security under scrutiny (Westport: Greenwood Press 2006).
  - W. Scott Thompson and Donaldson D. Frizzell, editors, The Lessons of Vietnam (New York: Crane, Russak 1977).
  - Spencer C. Tucker, editor, The Encyclopedia of the Vietnam War. A political, social, and military history (Oxford University 2000).

Articles

- Sam Adams, "Vietnam Cover-Up: Playing War with Numbers. A CIA conspiracy against its own intelligence", in Harper's, May, 1975. Accessed 2017-01-09.
- Robert Andersen, "Body Count of Lies. A CIA analyst's crusade against those who cooked the books in Vietnam", (Book review re Adams), in The Chicago Tribune, October 2, 1994. Accessed 2017-01-09.
- George C. Herring, "The Road to Tet", in The New York Times, 27 January 2017. Accessed 2017-01-27.
- Albin Krebs, "Samuel Adams, Ex-C.I.A. Officer and Libel Case Figure, Dies at 54" in The New York Times, October 11, 1988. Accessed 2016-03-20.
- Tom Mascaro, "The Uncounted Enemy. U.S. Documentary" at Museum of Broadcast Communications: Archives, Encyclopedia of Television. Accessed 2017-01-14.
- Thomas Powers, interviewed, "The Numbers Game. CIA analyst Sam Adams fought the intelligence establishment about its Vietnam policy like David fought Goliath", (Book Review of Adams), in The Atlantic, February, 1997. Accessed 2017-01-09.
- Eleanor Randolph, "Sam Adams' Vietnam Obsession", in The Washington Post, January 10, 1985. Accessed 2017-01-09.
- Robert Sinclair, "A Review of Who the Hell are we Fighting? The story of Sam Adams and the Vietnam intelligence wars. One intelligence analyst remembers another", (Book review of Hiam), in Studies in Intelligence, vol.50/4 (2006). Ac'd 2017-01-09.
- Times Wire Services, "Samuel A. Adams; Defendant in Gen. Westmoreland Libel Suit" in Los Angeles Times, October 13, 1988. Accessed 2017-01-10.
