= Acoustic Kitty =

1960s CIA project to use cats for spying

Acoustic Kitty was a Central Intelligence Agency (CIA) project launched by the Directorate of Science & Technology in the 1960s, which was intended to use cats to spy on the Kremlin and Soviet embassies.

== Procedure ==
In an hour-long procedure, a veterinary surgeon implanted a microphone in the cat's ear canal, a small radio transmitter at the base of its skull, and a thin wire into its fur. This would allow the cat to innocuously record and transmit sound from its surroundings. Due to problems with distraction, the cat's sense of hunger had to be addressed in another operation. Victor Marchetti, a former CIA officer, said Project Acoustic Kitty cost about $20 million.

The first Acoustic Kitty mission was to eavesdrop on two men in a park outside the Soviet embassy in Washington, D.C. According to Marchetti, the cat was released nearby, but was hit and allegedly killed by a taxi almost immediately. However, this was disputed in 2013 by Robert Wallace, a former director of the Office of Technical Service, who said that the project was abandoned due to the difficulty of training the cat to behave as required, and "the equipment was taken out of the cat; the cat was re-sewn for a second time, and lived a long and happy life afterwards". Subsequent tests also failed. Shortly thereafter the project was considered a failure and declared to be a total loss. However, other accounts report more success for the project.

== Legacy ==
The project was cancelled in 1967. A closing memorandum said that the CIA researchers believed that they could train cats to move short distances, but that "the environmental and security factors in using this technique in a real foreign situation force us to conclude that for our (intelligence) purposes, it would not be practical." The project was disclosed in 2001, when some CIA documents were declassified. The push for disclosure of project Acoustic Kitty is credited to author Jeffrey T. Richelson. The military did not give up on use of animals as spies, as in 2006 the Pentagon (DARPA) requested the creation of cyborg insects for use in espionage. Scientists at Cal Berkeley responded by creating a controllable cyborg beetle in October 2009.

== See also ==
- Birds Aren't Real
