= Upland Hills School =

School in Michigan, United States

Coordinates: 42°48′17.5″N 83°11′33.7″W

- Oxford, Michigan, USA

Information
- Founded: 1971

Upland Hills School, founded in 1971, is an independent school community in Oxford, Michigan, USA, whose purpose is to educate pre-high school children. The school's aim is to discover and respect the uniqueness of every child.

== Location ==
The school is located in northern Oakland County on 12 acres (49,000 m^{2}) of woods and rolling meadows in Oxford. The school is surrounded by the Upland Hills Ecological Awareness Center, Upland Hills Farm and Bald Mountain Recreation Area.

It is an independent school founded in 1971 by parents who were determined to create a school that protected, fostered, defended and nurtured the creativity and wonder of childhood. Inspired by the collective works of R. Buckminster Fuller and J. Krishnamurti, the school is devoted to thinking in whole systems and developing tools for self-awareness. The curriculum of the school embraces the theory of multiple intelligences and uses a developmental approach pioneered by Jean Piaget, Lawrence Kohlberg and Susanne Cook-Greuter. The school started experimenting with alternative energy in 1973 and has continued to develop an ecologically sustainable curriculum using tools and artifacts to demonstrate the effectiveness of working with nature's design. In 2010, the school installed 40 PV solar panels that generate over 10 KW of electrical energy moving it a step closer to becoming a net energy school.

The Community-Supported Agriculture, or CSA, serves as an outdoor classroom, allowing students to plant seeds, harvest, and learn about the food cycle. Additionally, the Karen Joy Theatre has been an integral part of curriculum since the school's founding, integrating performance, teamwork, and the magic of wonder.

== Affiliations ==
UHS is a member of the Association of Independent Michigan Schools and the National Coalition of Alternative Community Schools and has affiliations with the Buckminster Fuller Institute, The Starkey Hearing Foundation and the Independent Schools Association of the Central States.
