= Peer de Silva =

American intelligence officer (1917–1978)

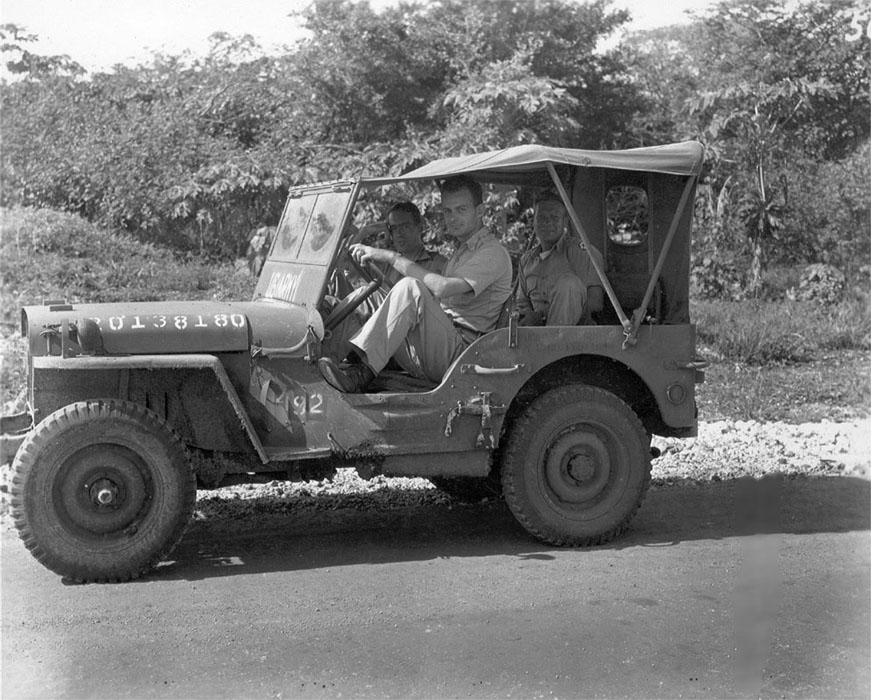
- De Silva on Tinian in 1945

Chief of Station, CIA
- In office 1956–1972

Chief of Operations Soviet Russia Division
- In office 1951–1956

Deputy Chief CIA base, Pullach
- In office 1949–1951

Personal details
- Born: June 26, 1917 San Francisco, California
- Died: August 13, 1978 (aged 61) Great Falls, Virginia
- Education: United States Military Academy
- Awards: Distinguished Intelligence Medal; Intelligence Service Medallion; Legion of Merit

Military service
- Allegiance: United States
- Branch/service: United States Army
- Years of service: 1941–1951
- Rank: Lieutenant Colonel
- Commands: 1st Technical Service Detachment
- Battles/wars: World War II; Atomic bombings of Hiroshima and Nagasaki

Peer de Silva (June 26, 1917 – August 13, 1978) was a station chief in the Central Intelligence Agency (CIA). A 1941 West Point graduate, during World War II he served as an Army officer providing security for the Manhattan Engineer District; this undercover project sought to build the first atomic bomb. After the war, he joined a pre-CIA military intelligence unit. Then, having learned Russian, he worked in central Europe, frequently traveling to Moscow. Resigning from the Army, he rose within CIA ranks, becoming a chief of station (COS). He first held such rank in Vienna, 1956–1959.

He next led the CIA station at the American Embassy in Seoul, South Korea, where he played a role in two major events. First was the democratic April Revolution in 1960. Yet in 1961 a successful May coup d'état installed General Pak Chung Hee (head of state, 1961–1979). De Silva then was assigned to Hong Kong as COS.

Following the November 1963 military overthrow of South Vietnamese President Ngo Dinh Diem (head of state, 1954–1963), President Johnson personally ratified de Silva as the CIA's new Chief of Station in Saigon. He quickly came to view the Vietnam War as political. He then advocated a counterinsurgency strategy, and took an active role in fostering such programs. The Viet Cong bombed the American Embassy in March 1965; the blast badly wounded de Silva. After an initial recovery, he returned to his post.

For a year de Silva served as the Director's first Vietnam expert (SAVA) at CIA headquarters in Virginia. However, he asked to be sent back to Southeast Asia, and arrived as COS in Bangkok in 1966. His last CIA assignment was to Canberra, Australia, where he served again as COS, until 1972.

== Early career ==
=== U.S. Army ===
Peer de Silva was born in San Francisco, California, on June 26, 1917. He entered the United States Military Academy at West Point, graduating 321st in the class of 1941. Posted to Military Intelligence, in 1942 he completed the Army's advanced school for the counterintelligence corps. Then serving as an Army officer in charge of security, he provided protection for scientists and technicians in the Manhattan Project. He personally escorted the plutonium hemispheres that formed the core of the Fat Man nuclear weapon to Tinian, the island in the western Pacific from which the raid on Nagasaki was staged. On the island, only hours before Bockscar took off for Japan, the hemispheres—called the "pit", on analogy with the seed of a stonefruit—were inserted into the center of their nuclear weapon.

Following the surrender of Japan, he accompanied a team of Manhattan Project scientists who conducted the radiological survey and compiled the final damage report on the atomic bombings of Hiroshima and Nagasaki. In October, 1945 he returned to Washington, D.C., for reassignment in the War Department. For his service with the Manhattan Project, he was awarded the Legion of Merit.

=== Strategic Services Unit ===
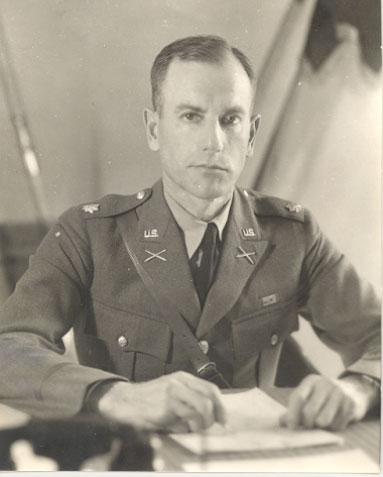
John Magruder, U.S. Army. Later OSS, SSU, & CIA.

The OSS, the major American foreign intelligence agency during World War II, interested de Silva. Although the OSS had been abolished in late 1945, core OSS functions were absorbed by a new military unit in the War Department: the SSU. It was headed by General John Magruder, formerly a deputy director of the OSS. In 1947 these core functions were folded into the newly created Central Intelligence Agency (CIA).

In the meantime, General Leslie Groves of the Manhattan Engineer District had agreed to transfer de Silva. At SSU, General Magruder assigned de Silva to "X-2" the counterintelligence section, in the new Cold War climate. Then at CIA de Silva, still in the Army, though working under Richard Helms, performed the delicate task of vetting former OSS agents, especially European refugees with "murky" backgrounds. De Silva had seen first hand the assault by Soviet espionage on the Manhattan project. An assignment to Europe was considered for de Silva, to counter Soviet attempts at malappropriation of scientific information.

=== Central Europe, USSR ===
An opportunity arose, however, for Russian language instruction at Columbia University, in a 3-year Army program. In 1946 de Silva obtained a transfer to begin his study of Russian; it continued in Germany at a school taught by Russian émigrés. In mid-1948 he was sent to Allied-occupied Austria. There he minded an unpleasant Russian colonel permitted to travel widely in the American zone, in order to speak with displaced persons; the Soviet offered them return to the USSR, a very unpopular option. Although as an Army officer he obtained his Russian language training, de Silva made contact with various CIA agents posted to central and eastern Europe, which was very tense terrain at the start of the Cold War.

During 1949 de Silva traveled by train or plane between Helsinki and Moscow, carrying classified documents as a diplomatic courier. "Except for a couple of American newsmen the only ones [in Moscow] were assigned to the Embassy. All were under frequent surveillance... . " To practice his Russian, and spot Soviet mailboxes and clandestine dead drops, he'd take the Moscow subway to the end of a line and walk, fast in the cold, back to the Embassy, trailed by Soviet agents. He witnesses "political terror". An African American in Russia since 1933 stopped him on the street and asked him to telephone his brother in Philadelphia. With another Russian-speaking U.S. Army officer he claims to have joined the 1949 May Day parade in Red Square. They ran with a Soviet group, while required to keep their hands up in the air to prevent assassination attempts. "In this fashion, we passed Stalin and Molotov, going at a fast fox trot, hurried on by the police." After six months and eleven round trips, the Soviets refused to grant him any further visas.

=== Pullach, West Germany ===
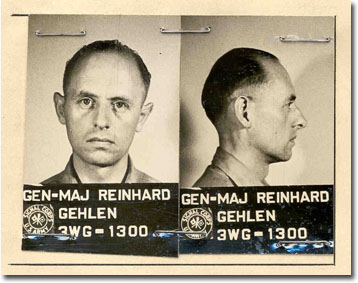
General Major Gehlen in 1945 (Photo: U.S. Army Signal Corps)

As "an Army officer on detail to the CIA" de Silva, from late 1949 to mid-1951, became deputy chief at the CIA base in Pullach, near Munich, in the newly independent Bundesrepublik Deutschland. The CIA then began to replace the Army intelligence in its role doing liaison work, begun during the Allied occupation of Germany with the reconstituted Gehlen organization. Also headquartered in Pullach, this West German intelligence organization was led by Reinhard Gehlen, who had during World War II commanded German military intelligence in the east.

A major part of de Silva's job in Pullach was to assist with the various West German efforts to collect information from the occupied Soviet Zone of Germany. A chief target was the Russian military establishment, its intentions and capabilities. Deputy chief de Silva frequently met with Gehlen, a shy introvert, but intense and dedicated. They worked to recruit German agents (known as V-männer), sent to or already living in the Soviet Zone. Awareness of the status of these agents was tricky, as sometimes a V-mann might be turned or doubled by opposing Communist officials, corrupting any subsequent information. In 1956 Gehlen became the first chief of West German intelligence, Bundesnachrichtendienst (BND).

=== CIA Headquarters ===
Back at CIA headquarters, then located in Washington near the Lincoln Memorial, de Silva in 1951 briefly worked in the Foreign Intelligence Staff under the veteran Eric Timm. de Silva was appointed chief of operations in the Soviet Russia Division. At first the CIA possessed no assets (intelligence agents) in the USSR. Without much success, the CIA had been parachuting Russian-speaking volunteers into the Soviet Union, with false papers. Almost all of them, however, were being captured and forced to serve the Soviets; any further information received was doctored, or worthless. One CIA operation in Russia that did meet with success involved a joint reconnaissance mission with the Navy, sending a small team to a newly built Soviet airfield in eastern Siberia. On occasion the CIA encountered the defection of a Soviet agent, which caused excitement. It required a studied response, patient observation, and a reception based on a calibrated trust. In 1955 an increase in defections kept the SR Division busy.

With the purpose of resigning as an Army officer de Silva had in 1951 been interviewed by the formidable General Walter Bedell Smith, then the DCI. Some routine orders to Army officers such as de Silva could interfere with their duties at CIA. In 1953 de Silva spoke with the new DCI Allen Dulles. He was honorably discharged by the Army. Accordingly, de Silva then became a civilian at CIA.

== Chief of Station (COS) ==
Following his service in the CIA's Soviet Russia Division, Peer de Siva was appointed Chief of Station (COS) at a number of different CIA posts: Austria, South Korea, Hong Kong, South Vietnam, Thailand, and Australia. The office of the COS was usually located at the American Embassy.

=== Vienna 1956 to 1959 ===
Austria 1945–1955; to the east: Budapest

In early 1955 Frank Wisner, the head of CIA's Clandestine Service, assigned de Silva to Vienna as deputy COS. He had been posted to occupied Austria before, by the Army in 1948.

==== Austria after occupation ====
The four-power occupation of Austria was then coming to an end. This change required reductions in the CIA station, and a corresponding reduction in the number of Soviet GRU and KGB intelligence agents. The CIA station in Vienna remained active and contrived to surreptitiously overhear preparations made by a neutral power (probably India) for a conference in Moscow. Also accomplished by bugging, the CIA discovered several Austrian nationals who'd been recruited as agents by Soviet intelligence; the CIA then managed to double them.

In 1956 de Silva filled the position of the departing COS. Fraternizing with Soviet agents had been prohibited by the CIA station, but changes encouraged and welcomed by de Silva allowed informal meetings between the rival groups of intelligence agents—until the bloody and chaotic events in Hungary intruded.

==== Hungarian revolt ====
By October the Hungarian Revolution of 1956 had erupted. The CIA in Vienna focused its resources and attention on the tense, life-or-death sequence unfolding in Budapest, about 200 kilometres (120 mi) down river. At first CIA headquarters entertained great hopes, some that went beyond what was probable, for the success of the Hungarian challenge to Communist rule. Such excessive zeal de Silva worked to restrain. After the Soviet-led invasion crushed the newly formed Hungarian government, a flood of refugees poured across the border. The aftermath of these events occupied much of the remainder of his tour of duty in Vienna.

As COS in Austria the very last event for de Silva was the Soviet-funded World Youth Festival of 1959. It was held in Vienna in July. De Silva reports that Austrian student groups turned the Festival into a propaganda disaster for its sponsor.

=== Seoul 1959 to 1962 ===
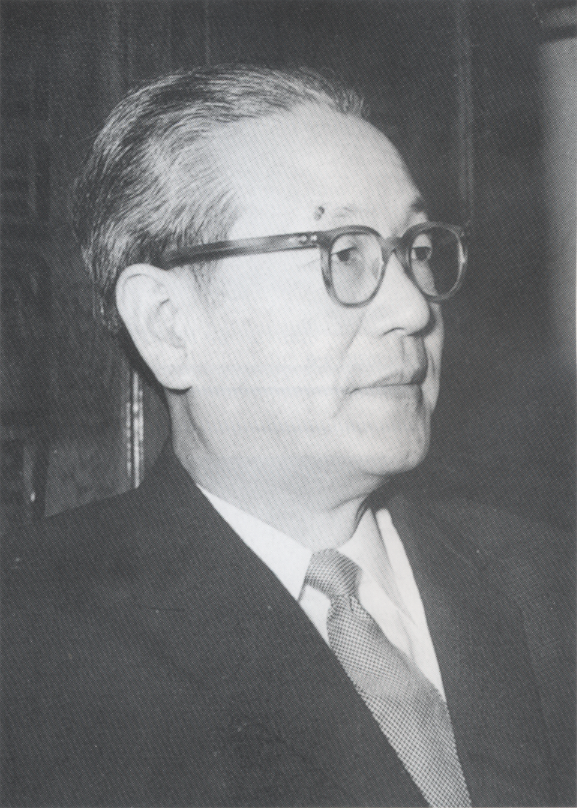
Chang Myon in 1956

After learning that de Silva desired a post in East Asia, Richard Helms then deputy chief in the Clandestine Service assigned him to Seoul as Chief of Station (COS). Syngman Rhee the president had many years before ejected the CIA wholesale from his country due to an unfortunate incident at Yong-do island. Not until 1959 was the CIA officially welcomed back into South Korea.

==== April Revolution ====
Although the elderly Rhee remained president he was surrounded by "an almost impenetrable 'human curtain' of aides" who ran the country. Widely unpopular, they were notorious for their arrogance and bribery, and the regime's security police for cruelty. One US Ambassador was leaving, another soon to arrive; 50,000 US troop helped keep an uneasy peace after the Korean War.

Another Christian politician, Chang Myon, enjoyed a popular following. Unfortunately, the Americans maintained few if any contacts with opposition politicians. Then de Silva obtained permission from the embassy to communicate with Chang Myon, and they established rapport. In early 1960 an election was held, in which Chang most probably bested the corrupt Rhee regime, but for the "fraud and deceit" practices by his aides. Student protests were mounted. The police fired on a protesting crowd in Seoul killing over a hundred, wounding thousands. The populace erupted in anger.

In the Blue House the ruling party gathered; their police and army had abandoned the streets to protesting crowds. While the US ambassador waited for instructions from Washington, de Silva telephoned the Blue House and spoke with the Defense Minister Kim Chong Yol, warning him of danger. The unexpected result was the scheduling of a meeting, approved by Washington, with Walter P. McConaughy the new Ambassador. In the embassy car de Silva rode with McConaughy through the teeming streets to the Blue House. There the government agreed to resign; the senile President Rhee would leave the country. At the news the street crowds celebrated. The 1960 April Revolution in South Korea eventually caused new elections, which resulted in a new democratic government led by the then popular Chang Myon.

In the period following the departure of Rhee but before the new election, American President Dwight Eisenhower came to Seoul on a state visit. He was greeted by Huh Chung of the interim government. "The Koreans were ecstatic... . ... Seoul was a mass of good-humored, cheering Koreans who took the occasion to shake every American hand they could find." Eisenhower extended his stay. At a breakfast at the US Embassy, de Silva saw an animated U.S. president converse with Korean dignitaries, including the leading candidate Chang Myon. The give-and-take encounter was "articulate, candid, and informative." The CIA's de Silva called the American leader's short visit "highly successful".

==== Park's coup d'état ====
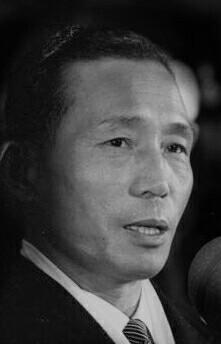
Pres. Park Chung-hee

The following year in May ROK General Park Chung Hee and accomplice senior officers staged the 1961 South Korean coup d'état, overthrowing the elected regime of Chang Myon. Yet prior to the coup, the American-inspired political order had been functioning anemically. The discredited police of the Rhee era could not maintain order, while massive student demonstrations often worked to manipulate and debilitate the regime's agenda. An incoherent governance impaired the already weak economy. Consequently, the national purpose was obscured by the ongoing conflict and confusion, which the gentlemanly Chang evidently could not cure.

The ROK Army then moved to reimpose a traditional authoritarian order and its values, undoing the nascent democracy. General Carter Magruder, the top American military officer, had understood that General Park was a Communist, and figured that the coup was mutiny, defying elected civilian authority and his own UN command. McConaughy had left Korea, the new US Ambassador had not yet arrived, leaving only the embassy's chargé d'affaires. Eventually Chang Myon came to visit de Silva, who had warned Chang before the coup. Yet however pleased by the visit, other circumstances compelled de Silva to turn to several ROK Army officers, Captain Pak Chong Gyu and Colonel Kim Chong Pil.

This led to de Silva's first interview with coup-leader General Park Chung Hee. American intelligence had concluded Park was not a Communist, and de Silva counseled Park to initiate a mutual understanding with the Americans. Yet continuing conflicts caused a nationalist ROK battalion to surround the US Embassy. The Pentagon, according to de Silva, now saw the danger in the impasse and Magruder met with Park. As the new US Ambassador Samuel Berger arrived, the situation became functional.

Thereafter, The South Korean economy initiated an era of rapid growth. The authoritarian General and later President Park Chung Hee, remains a controversial figure in South Korean history.

=== Hong Kong 1962 to 1963 ===
==== Balancing act ====
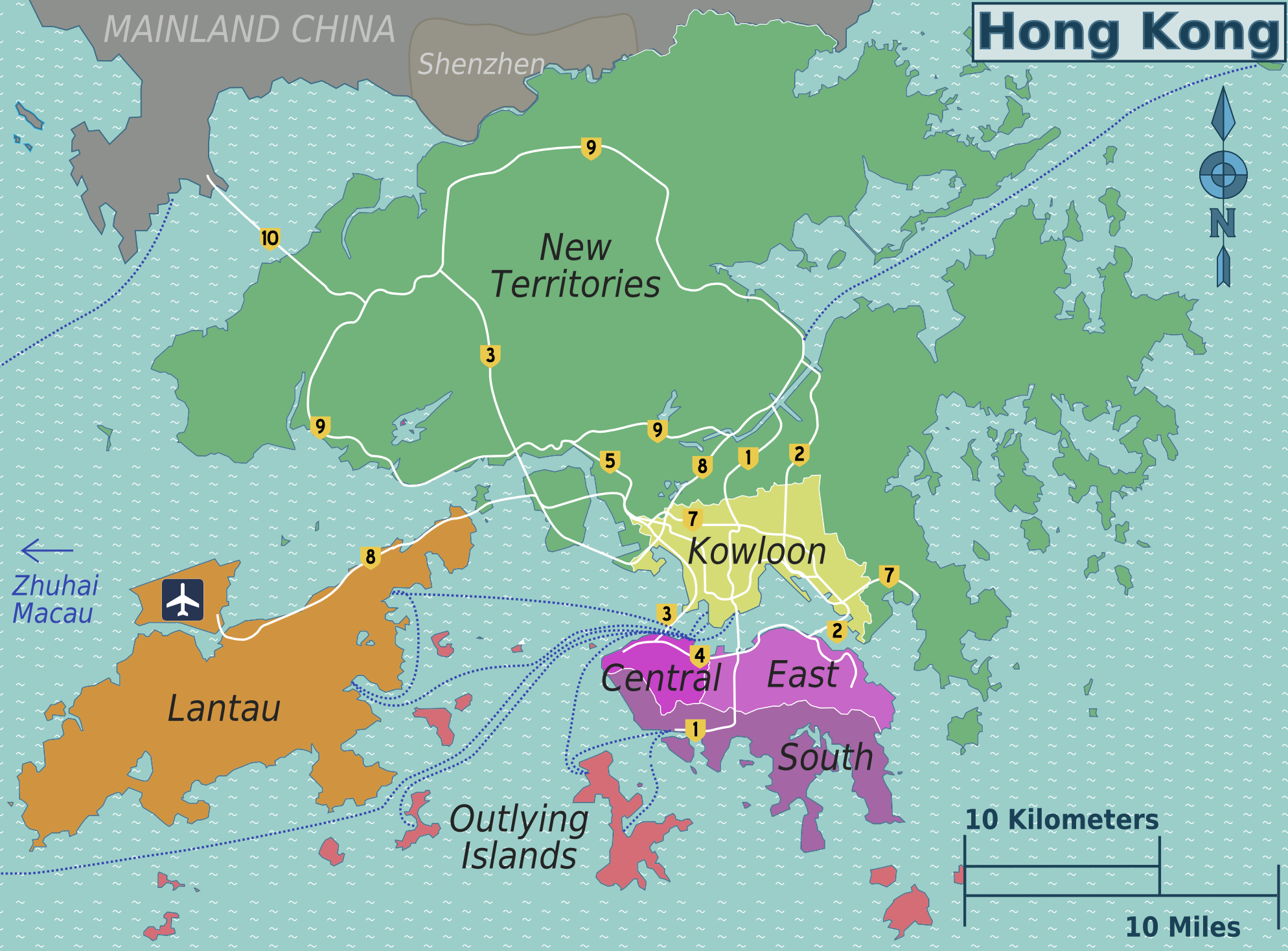
Hong Kong, with the PRC in grey

Desmond Fitzgerald, chief of the CIA's Far East Division, told de Silva of his new assignment. In Hong Kong de Silva found the case officers speaking Mandarin or Cantonese, and that they were considered "old China hands," having done repeated CIA tours in East Asia. Fluent in Russian and familiar with Europe, de Silva realized the value of their experience.

The British who governed Hong Kong remained mindful of the nearby People's Republic of China (PRC), which not only had substantial business entities located in the city, but also controlled its water supply. Accordingly, de Silva was careful that the CIA not upset the delicate, prevailing balance the British had constructed. Nonetheless, the CIA conducted espionage activities that targeted the mainland. These met with little success, the PRC then being territory very difficult for foreign intelligence to penetrate.

==== Agents, refugees ====
The Kuomintang nationalist Chinese of Taiwan also ran agents into the PRC (then often called Communist China or Red China). In fact, double agents among Chinese-speakers were common. For their part the British when they captured Chinese spies from either side, as was common, diplomatically returned each to their country of origin. "Altogether it was a never-ending burlesque, except that people did die performing it," wrote de Silva.

Most of the population in Hong Kong were refugees or escapees from the PRC, or their descendants. Chinese continued trying to escape to Hong Kong, and the British steered a careful path in refusing or accepting such new arrivals. Chinese seeking asylum were interrogated by the British, who thereby gathered "sociological intelligence" on the Communist regime, current information about rations, the economy, and morale. Frequently, de Silva performed routine liaison work vis-á-vis his British counterparts in intelligence and security. Stationed to Hong Kong for a three-year tour, de Silva and his wife stayed only 17 months.

=== Saigon 1963 to 1965 ===
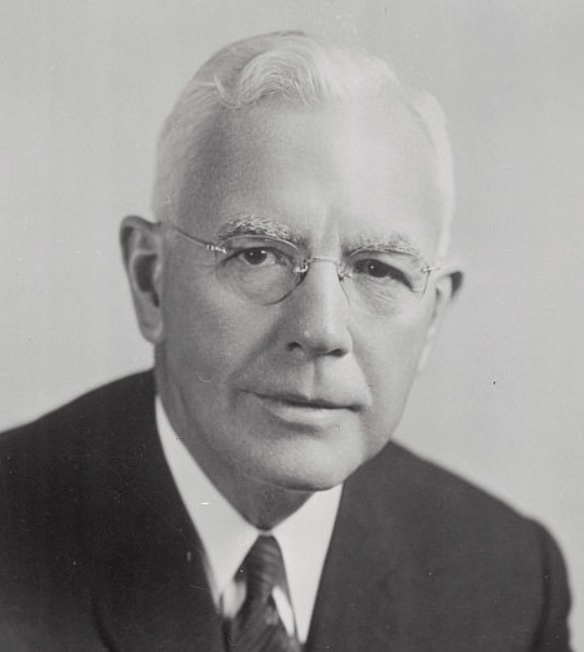
John McCone, DCI 1961–1965.

==== Sudden assignment ====
In November 1963, the new chief of CIA's Far East Division William Colby requested that de Silva travel from Hong Kong to South Vietnam, and meet him there for an extensive inspection of CIA operations. Colby had recently served as COS in Saigon. Since, John H. Richardson, a "long-time friend" of de Silva, had been COS in Saigon, until that October when he'd been fired by the new Ambassador Henry Cabot Lodge. In their inspection Colby and de Silva focused on the government's conflict with the Viet Cong insurgency, investigating the cities and the countryside. It was soon after the military coup that overthrew President Ngo Dinh Diem on November 1. Colby told de Silva his next assignment would probably be Saigon. On December 10, DCI John McCone suddenly ("Upon receipt of this message") transferred de Silva to COS Saigon. Immediately de Silva flew to Washington to see the Director, who took him to the White House. Previously Johnson had made it clear to McCone he wanted a "four-star CIA man for the post." Meeting the President in person, de Silva "passed muster".

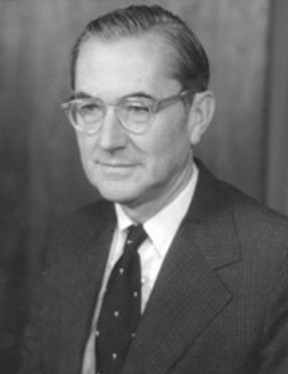
William Colby, Far East Div. of CIA, Head of CORDS in 1968.

When de Silva arrived in Saigon as COS the CIA station numbered about 400 people, the largest in the agency. Its personnel performed at least fifteen different lines of professional and technical work. The CIA worked with Vietnamese intelligence to establish National Interrogation Centers, and instructed the National Police on modern methods. The "soft" technique the CIA taught caused the subject being questioned to realize that his or her "well-being was best served by responding truthfully". Not effective every time, it was "consistently productive". It worked better than torture.

==== Diagnosis: political war ====
Westmoreland was the new military commander, Taylor (chairman of the Joint Chiefs of Staff) became the new ambassador, and McNamara was Secretary of Defense. These three then made poor decisions, according to de Silva. Taylor instructed Westmoreland to fight a "big war" which was the wrong war, and led to the 1975 defeat. Au contraire, de Silva understood the war as being primarily a political contest, calling for counterinsurgency operations. It was not the regular military's conflict. In 1978, looking back at events, the CIA's William Colby said that de Silva "really did identify the political nature of the war." The Washington Post then commented:

For that reason he opposed plans to bomb the north, although the bombing was advocated by General Maxwell D. Taylor, then the U.S. Ambassador in Saigon, and by General William C. Westmoreland, the U.S. military commander. Mr. de Silva had known Westmoreland when he and the general were cadets at the U. S. Military Academy in West Point.

==== Counterinsurgency ====
The Viet Cong enemy, according to de Silva, had two strategies: 1) ambush the military; and 2) terrorize the rural people and civil leaders. The night belonged to the Viet Cong. Torture and murder effectively intimidated the villagers, who thereafter fed them, hid them, kept them informed, and joined their ranks. The "Vietcong had constant access to excellent intelligence". Not surprisingly, for many Americans in Vietnam the "idea of counterinsurgency [had become] an instant cult". In 1964 de Silva was actively confronting the political war against the Viet Cong, and advocating programs. He wrote a CIA report, "Our Counterinsurgency Experiment and its Implications".

==== Wounded by car bomb ====
On March 30, 1965, de Silva was badly injured by a Vietcong car bomb. About eleven that morning, as de Silva spoke on the telephone, he looked out his office window at the American Embassy. A car had its hood was raised, and a policeman was angry. Just as de Silva suddenly recognized grey smoke from the detonating device "the car exploded with 350 pounds of C-4 plastic". Flying glass fragments penetrated his face, throat, chest, and hands; he could see only "a red screen". de Silva was back at his post in four weeks, but not fully recovered.

==== As the DCI's SAVA ====
To better the medical treatment for his eyes, de Silva in 1965 was stationed for a year at CIA Headquarters at Langley, near Washington, D.C. Admiral William Raborn, the new DCI, assigned de Silva to his staff as the first special assistant for Vietnam affairs (SAVA). A meeting on the regional conflict included Admiral Raborn, US Ambassador to Laos William H. Sullivan, Des Fitzgerald the DDP at CIA, William Colby then head of CIA's Far East Division, and de Silva with his hard-won experience. During that year the mushrooming increase in the American militarization of the Vietnam conflict "frustrated and baffled" American war aims, as de Silva understood the situation. A return to the field then became what de Silva desired.

=== Bangkok 1966 to 1968 ===
Thailand in white, at the edge of war in Cambodia, Laos, and Vietnam

Graham Martin, the US Ambassador to Thailand, in 1966 requested de Silva's assignment to Bangkok. When the current COS in Bangkok was scheduled to leave, Colby heeded Martin's request and recommended de Silva to Fitzgerald who approved. Marine Colonel Richard Mample came with de Silva as his deputy. Yet de Silva still suffered from the car bomb; "some days he could barely get in a couple of good hours."

==== Counterinsurgency ====
Thailand, too, was threatened with an "armed Communist subversive movement" but one relatively small and isolated. Yet Thailand played a key supporting role in the regional, Southeast Asian conflict. In his book de Silva states that Martin was in fundamental agreement with him about identifying the mistakes America had made in Vietnam. Together they persuaded their "Thai counterparts not to militarize the counterinsurgency effort" but to keep their campaign, although armed, under civilian control. Accordingly, the US embassy in Bangkok (which housed the CIA station) should be the institution charged with directing the American support for Thailand, not Military Assistance Command, Thailand (MACTHAI), which was the counterpart to MACV.

==== Terminated program ====
Once when traveling from Bangkok to Saigon, de Silva had sought without success a meeting with Robert Komer, head of CORDS, in order to challenge his approach to pacification. Although de Silva's views were prevailing in Thailand, the next year Ambassador Martin left for his new post in Rome. Martin's replacement in the Embassy was more accommodating to Pentagon requests.

The CIA's Ralph McGehee, working in northeast Thailand, had developed a survey program that utilized methods used in Vietnam. When the CIA's Far East chief William Colby visited northeast Thailand in 1967, McGehee was pleased to show him the results of his counterinsurgency surveys. Unexpectedly, Colby was dismissive; McGehee was transferred out of Thailand, and the apparently successful survey program cancelled. According to archivist John Prados, it was COS de Silva who, in October 1967, broke the news to McGehee of Colby's decision. Then early in 1968 de Silva "somewhat bloodied and wearied by [his prior] experience in Vietnam" requested a return to CIA Headquarters.

=== Canberra 1971 to 1972 ===
After serving at a CIA post in San Francisco and at Langley Headquarters with the Foreign Intelligence staff, in 1971 de Silva asked for a foreign assignment. He was offered COS in Canberra, Australia. The post was enjoyable if not as exciting as prior assignments. He functioned mostly as liaison with the competent and friendly Australian intelligence services. It was to be de Silva's "tombstone" assignment with CIA, which ran from May 1971, to December 1972.

== His posthumous book ==
Following his retirement from the Central Intelligence Agency, Peer de Silva wrote a book on his career. Entitled Sub Rosa it was published posthumously in 1978. It had been approved by the CIA's Publications Review Board. He had been working on two other books regarding his experience in intelligence, which remained unfinished.

Peer de Silva died on August 13, 1978, of an apparent heart attack at his home at Great Falls, Virginia. He was survived by his wife, sons Peer, Paul, and Michael, his daughters, Catherine, Sharon, and Robin, and his brother, Paul.

De Silva is played by Ron Frazier in Robert Benton's 1989 film Fat Man and Little Boy, about the Manhattan Project.
