= The CIA and the Cult of Intelligence =

Non-fiction political book written by Victor Marchetti

- Author: Victor Marchetti, John D. Marks
- Language: English
- Subject: Central Intelligence Agency
- Genre: Non-fiction
- Publisher: Alfred A. Knopf
- Publication date: June 12, 1974
- Publication place: United States
- Media type: Print (Hardcover & Paperback)
- Pages: 398
- ISBN: 0-394-48239-5
- OCLC: 920485
- Dewey Decimal: 327.1/2/06073 19
- LC Class: JK468.I6 M37 1974

The CIA and the Cult of Intelligence is a 1974 non-fiction political book written by Victor Marchetti, a former special assistant to the Deputy Director of the Central Intelligence Agency, and John D. Marks, a former officer of the United States Department of State.

== Content ==
The book discusses how the CIA works and how its original purpose (i.e. collecting and analyzing information about foreign governments, corporations, and persons in order to advise public policymakers) has, according to the author, been subverted by its obsession with clandestine operations.

It was the first book that the U.S. federal government took to court to censor before publication. The CIA demanded that the authors remove 339 passages, but they resisted, and ultimately only 168 passages were deleted. The publisher, Alfred A. Knopf, published the book with blanks for deleted passages and with boldface type for items which the CIA initially wanted deleted, but later withdrew its objections. It is perhaps the earliest published book to adopt this format.

The book was a critically acclaimed bestseller whose publication contributed to the establishment of the Church Committee, a United States Senate select committee to study governmental operations with respect to intelligence activities, in 1975. The book was published in paperback by Dell Publishing in 1975.

== Cult of intelligence ==
Victor Marchetti used the expression "cult of intelligence" to denounce what he viewed as a counterproductive mindset and culture of secrecy, elitism, amorality and lawlessness within and surrounding the Central Intelligence Agency in the service of American imperialism:

There exists in our nation today a powerful and dangerous secret cult -- the cult of intelligence. Its holy men are the clandestine professionals of the Central Intelligence Agency. Its patrons and protectors are the highest officials of the federal government. Its membership, extending far beyond governmental circles, reaches into the power centers of industry, commerce, finance, and labor. Its friends are many in the areas of important public influence -- the academic world and the communications media. The cult of intelligence is a secret fraternity of the American political aristocracy. The purpose of the cult is to further the foreign policies of the U.S. government by covert and usually illegal means, while at the same time containing the spread of its avowed enemy, communism. Traditionally, the cult's hope has been to foster a world order in which America would reign supreme, the unchallenged international leader. Today, however, that dream stands tarnished by time and frequent failures. Thus, the cult's objectives are now less grandiose, but no less disturbing. It seeks largely to advance America's self-appointed role as the dominant arbiter of social, economic, and political change in the awakening regions of Asia, Africa, and Latin America. And its worldwide war against communism has to some extent been reduced to a covert struggle to maintain a self-serving stability in the Third World, using whatever clandestine methods are available.

== Critical reception ==
In his 1978 memoir, Honorable Men: My Life in the CIA, William Colby, a former Director of the Central Intelligence Agency, endorsed Marchetti's critique and adopted the use of the expression "cult of intelligence":

Socially as well as professionally they cliqued together, forming a sealed fraternity. They ate together at their own special favorite restaurants; they partied almost only among themselves; their families drifted to each other, so their defenses did not always have to be up. In this way they increasingly separated themselves from the ordinary world and developed a rather skewed view of that world. Their own dedicated double life became the proper norm, and they looked down on the life of the rest of the citizenry. And out of this grew what was later named -- and condemned -- as the "cult" of intelligence, an inbred, distorted, elitist view of intelligence that held it to be above the normal processes of society, with its own rationale and justification, beyond the restraints of the Constitution, which applied to everything and everyone else.

== In popular culture ==
In reaction to Marchetti's use of the expression "cult of intelligence", it has also come to be used by some writers of conspiracy theory and conspiracy fiction to describe a cabal, with a pyramid-shaped hierarchy, which is fanatically devoted to gathering secrets, often of an esoteric or occult nature.

== See also ==
- CIA influence on public opinion
- Family Jewels (Central Intelligence Agency)
- Kerry Committee
- Philip Agee
- Pike Committee
- Robert Seldon Lady § 2009 Interview
- United States House Permanent Select Committee on Intelligence
- United States President's Commission on CIA Activities within the United States
- United States Senate Select Committee on Intelligence
