= Who's Who in CIA =

1968 book by Julius Mader

- Author: Julius Mader
- Publication date: 1968
- Publication place: East Germany

Who's Who in CIA is a book written by the East German journalist Julius Mader (also known as Thomas Bergner) and self-published in East Berlin in 1968. It was titled as Who's who in CIA; ein biographisches Nachschlagewerk über 3000 Mitarbeiter der zivilen und militärischen Geheimedienstzweige der USA in 120 Staaten (German) and Who's who in CIA; a biographical reference work on 3,000 officers of the civil and military branches of the secret services of the USA in 120 countries (English).

Mader was employed by the East German military publishing house Die Wirtschaft, and apparently wrote the book while working closely with Stasi and probably with KGB assistance. The book purported to identify about 3,000 active agents of the U.S. Central Intelligence Agency, and has been described as an "active measure" of disinformation whose intent was to discredit both correctly and incorrectly identified individuals. It included cards for reporting corrections or the addition of further purported agents to the editor.

== Content ==
The majority of the book consists of listings of people and their supposed biographical and employment details. Many famous people are listed in this book, including Bill Moyers, Lyndon Johnson, Robert McNamara, and others. The book also includes six fold-out organizational charts (late 1960s) of the following: American Intelligence Services, Office of Intelligence Research (OIR), National Security Agency (NSA), Military Intelligence Headquarters of the USA (The Pentagon), Federal Bureau of Investigation (FBI) and cover organizations used by the CIA.

Mader included neither a publisher's statement nor a license number. He listed himself as an editor with the address of Dr. Julius Mader, 1066 Berlin W 66, Mauerstrasse 69. However, this address was actually in East Berlin, not West. The compilation of biographical information is described as having involved the cooperation of Mohamed Abdelnabi, Ambalal Bhatt, Fernando Gamarra and Shozo Ohashi.

From Who's Who in CIA:

The rulers of the USA are, of course, extremely interested in keeping the mantle of secrecy over their intelligence network... The invisible government shall have neither names nor faces... For this reason the time appeared to have come to demask a first representative selection of leading officials and officers, collaborators and agents of the US intelligence services who are operating on five continents. The result is this “WHO'S WHO IN CIA” whereby CIA could be used as an appropriate synonym for the whole of the US intelligence system.–Julius Mader

Two detachable cards were included in the book. The reader was asked to send the editor corrections and suggest more names of purported CIA agents and other intelligence officials.

== Reliability ==
Ladislav Bittman, who defected to the US in 1968, reported to Congress that he and others at the Czechoslovak StB had helped to write Who's Who in CIA. According to Bittman, Who's Who in CIA was only partly reliable, included incorrect information on purpose, and was intended as disinformation:

About half of the names listed in that book are real CIA operatives. The other half are people who were just American diplomats or various officials; and it was prepared with the expectation that naturally many, many Americans operating abroad, diplomats and so on, would be hurt because their names were exposed as CIA officials.–Ladislav Bittman

== Impact ==
The book was reviewed in March 1969 by Art Kunkin of the Los Angeles Free Press. Kunkin's review included excerpts and one of the five organizational fold out charts. He explicitly identified it as a work of disinformation, beginning his review with the statement "Who's Who in CIA was undoubtedly compiled as a weapon of Russia against the United States".

CIA Station Chief Richard Welch was assassinated in Greece in 1975 by the Marxist Revolutionary Organization 17 November (17N). Welch had previously been outed as a CIA operative in Who's Who In CIA. His assassination was one of the events that led to the Intelligence Identities Protection Act.

Who's Who in CIA was publicized through the early 1990s in the publications Top Secret and Geheim.

A copy of this book has been included in exhibits at the International Spy Museum in Washington, DC.

== CIA response ==
In retaliation, the CIA and other intelligence services assisted journalist John Barron in writing his book KGB: The Secret Work of Soviet Secret Agents, the appendix of which named 1,557 alleged KGB and GRU officers posted abroad under diplomatic cover. In 1977 Barron told the New York Times that he received help from the CIA in writing the appendix. This is supported by a 1975 CIA analysis of KGB's “machine input” (later declassified), which stated that 942 of the 1,557 persons listed “were identified by classified sources only”, while for others information was more publicly accessible.

== See also ==
- Intelligence Identities Protection Act
- Plame affair
- Inside the Company
