= Outside the Lines =

- Starring: Jeremy Schaap
- Country of origin: United States
- No. of seasons: 32

Production
- Running time: 30 minutes

Original release
- Network: ESPN
- Release: May 7, 1990 – August 13, 2022

Outside the Lines is an American sports news and analysis program that was broadcast by ESPN from 1990 to 2022. The series featured segments with discussions and investigative journalism surrounding prominent headlines and topics within sports.

The series had aired on ESPN in some form since 1990, initially as a monthly newsmagazine hosted by Bob Ley, and later expanding into a weekly Sunday-morning program. In 2003, Outside the Lines added a weekday edition as part of ESPN's lineup of studio programs. In 2017, both The Sports Reporters and the Sunday edition of Outside the Lines were cancelled and replaced by a weekly edition of E:60 hosted by Ley and Jeremy Schaap, which would be produced by the OTL staff.

After Ley's retirement in June 2019, ESPN announced in October 2019 that the weekday edition of Outside the Lines would be cancelled and replaced by a new weekly edition on Saturday mornings outside the football season, hosted by Schaap. In February 2023, the weekly program was cancelled. The show's staff will continue to produce feature segments under the Outside the Lines branding for SportsCenter and ESPN.com.

== History ==
The show premiered in 1990 as a monthly one-hour program with Bob Ley as host. After a noticeable increase in ratings, ESPN decided to expand the program for thirty minutes to their Sunday morning lineup at 9:30 am ET, where the show covered one or two of the more notable sporting news stories of the week.

After the ratings continued to grow, on May 12, 2003, ESPN premiered Outside the Lines Nightly. The Sunday morning program was still seen at 9:30 am ET, along with the nightly show that was seen during The Trifecta at midnight and noon on ESPN. On June 12, 2006, ESPN announced that Outside the Lines Nightly would be known as Outside the Lines First Report and moved to 3:30 pm ET as part of the afternoon lineup on ESPN, and eventually moved to 3:00 pm ET. Following the addition of NFL Insiders to ESPN's schedule on August 5, 2013, the weekday OTL program (which by this point carried the same name as the Sunday series) began to be moved to air in the late afternoons on ESPN2 during the football season; it returns to the 3 p.m. ET slot on ESPN after the Super Bowl and would air there until the start of training camp in August, with occasional moves to ESPNEWS depending on sporting events scheduled for ESPN2. On September 8, 2014, it began to be preceded on ESPN2 by Olbermann, with Keith Olbermann and Ley having a cross-talk segment with each other leading out of Olbermann and into OTL; OTL moved back to its regular 3 p.m. ESPN berth at the start of February 2015.

The program, both in the weekday and Sunday form, usually ran commercial-free from the top of the hour to 22 minutes past the hour, with the program's commercial load taking up most of the last eight minutes and ending with a note of video and audio on-demand options and promotions for primetime programming, along with Twitter and Facebook responses to that day's listed discussion hashtag.

The final Sunday morning edition of Outside the Lines aired on May 7, 2017. It was replaced in the same 9:00 a.m. ET time slot with a new hour-long weekly edition of E:60 the following Sunday (May 14, 2017), which features contributions from the OTL staff. Bob Ley and Jeremy Schaap (son of the late Dick Schaap, the original host of The Sports Reporters, which ended its 29-year run that year on May 7) would become the co-hosts of the new Sunday edition of E:60.

On June 26, 2019, Bob Ley announced his retirement from ESPN after a 40-year tenure.

On October 22, 2019, ESPN canceled the weekday edition of Outside the Lines, its final airing being December 20, 2019. The series reverted to being a weekly, Saturday-morning broadcast beginning in January 2020. In addition, it was stated that the show would contribute content for ESPN.com and segments during SportsCenter. The weekly show would air during the college and NFL football offseason, running from February (following the Super Bowl) through August. In February 2023, it was reported that the weekly show had been cancelled, with Outside the Lines continuing to be used as a content brand on ESPN's digital platforms and SportsCenter.

== Format ==
All of the different versions of the show, whether OTL Sunday, OTL Nightly or OTL First Report, share the same basic format. Like the program's title, the show looks "outside the lines" at some of the most controversial and even inspirational stories in the sports world today. The program also often interviews story makers, such as members of Pat Tillman's platoon after he was killed in Afghanistan. The program also is joined by former players and sports writers to get all different opinions of the subject at hand.

=== Segments ===
Listed below are the numerous segments that appear throughout Outside the Lines; note that for certain stories or sports news topics of heavy interest, the format is dropped and consists only of "At This Hour" followed by a debate segment with guests. They include:

- Big Story: This segment appears at the beginning of the program when the host goes over the hottest stories from around the sports world.
- The B Block: This segment usually entails a deep dive into a topic that may have flown under the radar. B Block stories range from inspirational, to lighthearted to troubling from across the entire sports spectrum.
- The Bob Ley Take or Not BLT: At the end of the show, the host shares their commentary on a topic ranging from serious (like Baylor University's handling of sexual assault) to whimsical (the Philadelphia Flyers introduction of a new mascot, Gritty).

== Stories covered ==
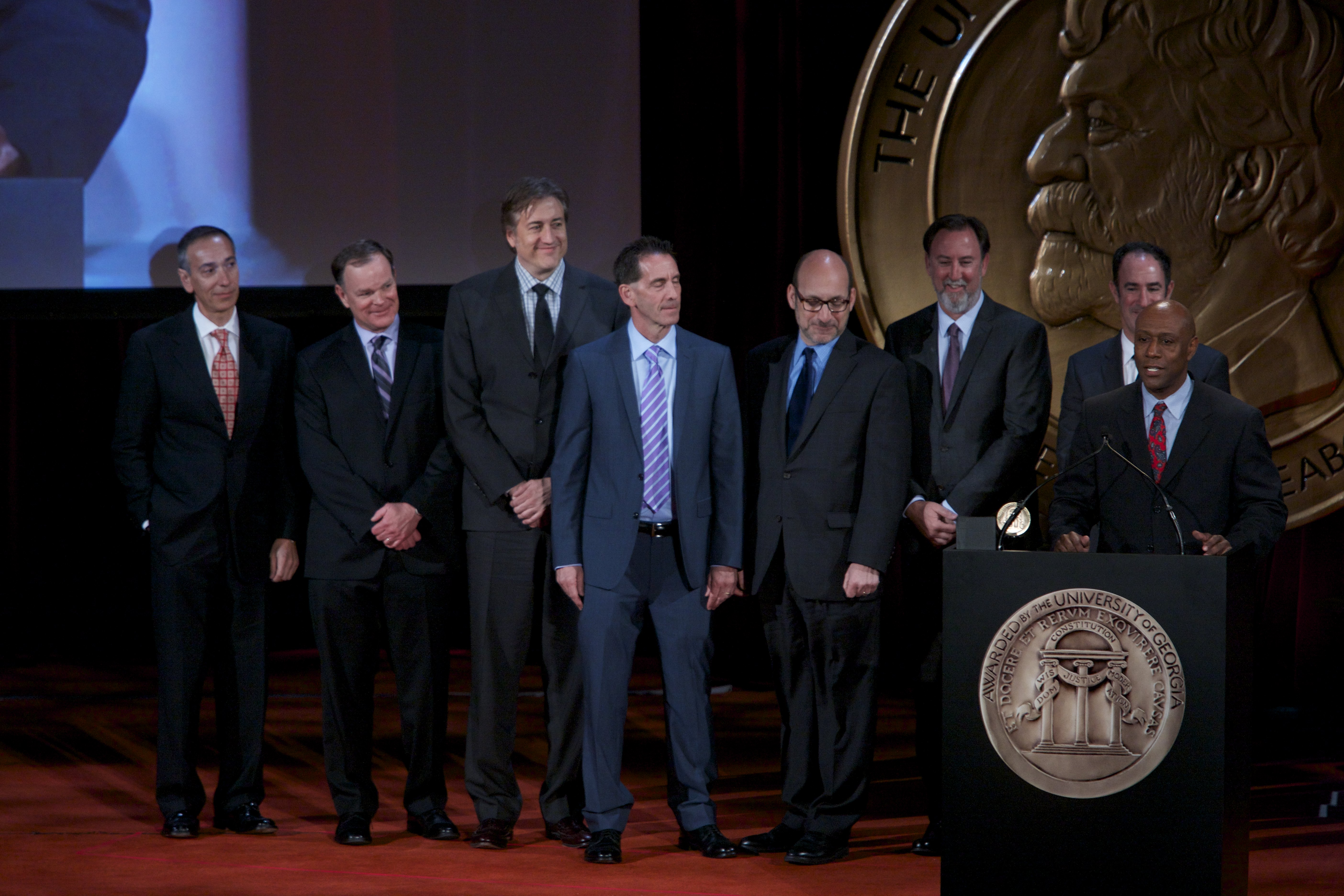
Dwayne Bray accepts the Peabody Award for Outside the Lines: "NFL at a Crossroads: Investigating a Health Crisis". He is joined on stage by the crew from ESPN.

Over the years, Outside the Lines has covered several Sports Emmy Award winning pieces such as Finding Bobby Fischer, Ben Comen, and Rainbow Man. It also covered the NFL's concussion crisis in the Peabody Award winning piece NFL at a Crossroads: Investigating a Health Crisis.

Some of the other memorable pieces the show has covered include: Two Man Band (about Patrick Hughes, a blind member of the University of Louisville band and his dad), The Jason McElwain Story (about the autistic high school basketball manager who came into a game and scored 20 points), Athletes Carrying Guns (about whether it is appropriate for athletes to carry guns), Katrina's Impact on New Orleans (prior to the Saints' first game back in New Orleans) and Steroids impact on the Little Leagues (and how much they affect them). It also heavily covered the USA Gymnastics sex abuse scandal, including extended coverage of the victim impact statements against Larry Nassar in Ingham County, Michigan Circuit Court, and the effects it had on Michigan State University and other intervening stories around the school.

The program has also featured exclusive interviews with newsmakers such as: President George W. Bush, Senators John McCain, Amy Klobuchar, Heidi Heitkamp, Pete Rose, Phil Jackson (after leaving the Lakers the first time) and the Army Rangers of Pat Tillman's platoon about what really happened. More recently, former NBA player John Amaechi appeared on the February 11, 2007 edition to publicly come out as gay, and the May 11, 2008 edition reported that former USC basketball star O. J. Mayo had allegedly received thousands of dollars in cash and merchandise from a runner for a sports agent dating back to his high school career.
