= Philip Agee =

CIA officer and author (1935–2008)

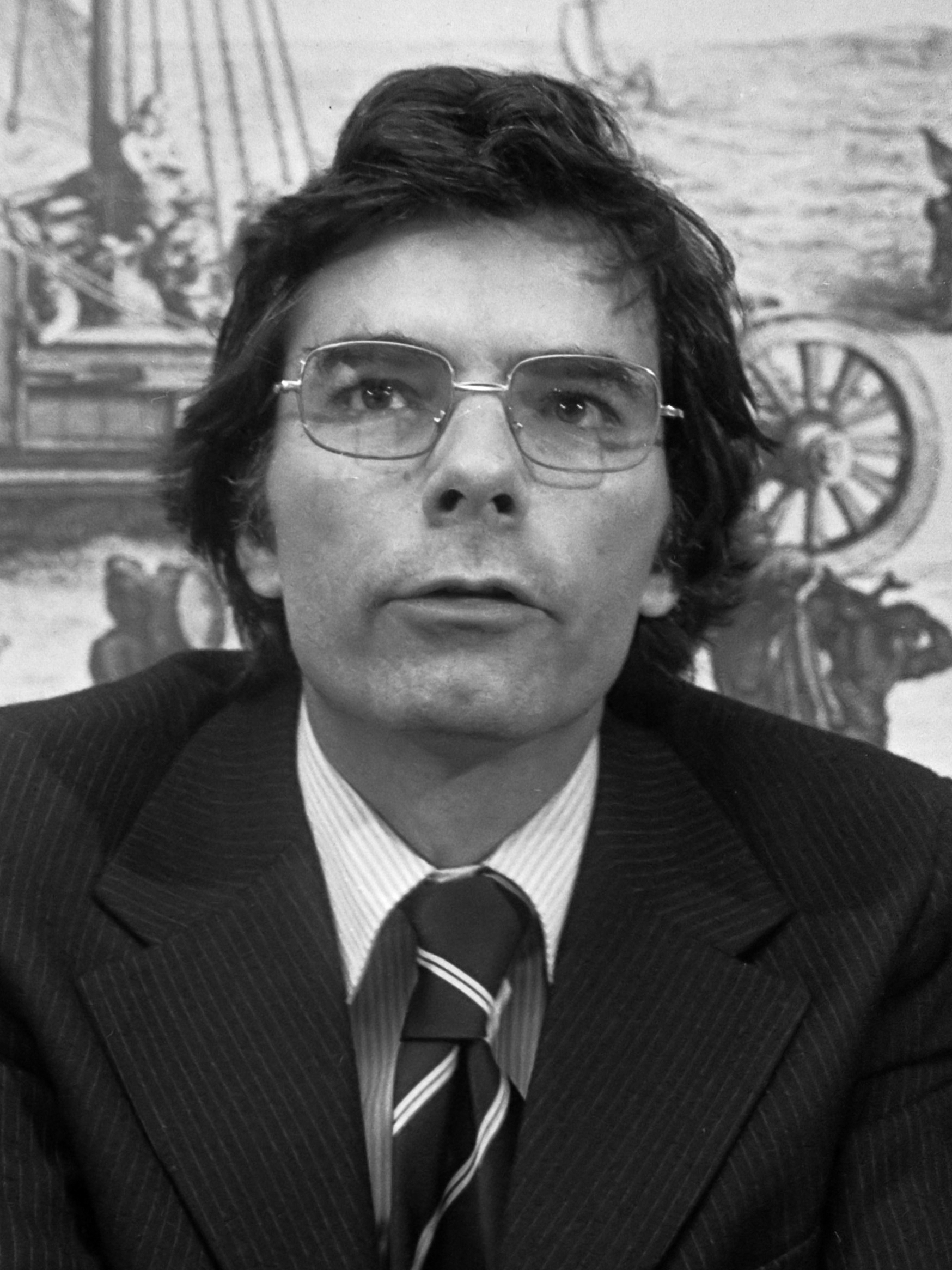
- Agee in 1977
- Born: January 19, 1935; Tacoma, Florida, U.S.
- Died: January 7, 2008 (aged 72); Havana, Cuba
- Resting place: Canley Garden Cemetery and Crematorium, Canley, Metropolitan Borough of Coventry, West Midlands, England
- Education: University of Notre Dame; University of Florida
- Employer: Central Intelligence Agency
- Spouses: Janet Marie Wasserberger (m. 1959; div. 1974) Giselle Roberge (m. 1978)
- Children: 2; Philip and Christopher

Philip Burnett Franklin Agee (/ˈeɪdʒi/; January 19, 1935 – January 7, 2008) was a Central Intelligence Agency (CIA) case officer and writer of the 1975 bestseller, Inside the Company: CIA Diary, detailing his experiences in the Agency. Agee joined the CIA in 1957, and over the next decade had postings in Washington, D.C., Ecuador, Uruguay and Mexico. After resigning from the CIA in 1968, he became a leading opponent of its practices. A co-founder of the CounterSpy and CovertAction series of periodicals, he died in Cuba in January 2008.

== Early years ==
Agee was born in Tacoma, Florida and raised in Tampa. In his memoir On the Run (1987), he wrote that he had "a privileged upbringing in a big white house bordering an exclusive golf club". After graduating from Tampa's Jesuit High School, he attended the University of Notre Dame, from which he graduated with honors in philosophy in 1956. He later attended the University of Florida College of Law, and served in the United States Air Force from 1957 to 1960. Agee then worked as a case officer for the Central Intelligence Agency from 1960 to 1968, including postings to Quito, Montevideo, and Mexico City.

== Leaving the CIA ==
Agee stated that by the late 1960s, his Roman Catholic social conscience had made him increasingly uncomfortable with his work, resulting in his disillusionment with the CIA and its support for authoritarian governments across Latin America. He came to believe that the Agency was repressing legitimate national ideals to serve the interests of U.S. multinational corporations. He was disturbed that U.S. forces were used to quell the revolution in the Dominican Republic in 1965, "not because it was Communist but because it was nationalist".

Agee's disillusionment came to a head in the months leading up to and during the 1968 Mexico City Olympic Games. Beginning in summer of 1967, he had a "cover" assignment to work with the Olympic Organizing Committee and its year-long Cultural Program of events. Agee's first marriage was ending, and in an Inside the Company diary entry from December 1967, he wrote:

The other unexpected development is a serious and deepening relationship with a woman I met on the Organizing Committee. I took a chance and told her I had worked for the CIA before, but in spite of her strong reaction she agreed to keep seeing me. She is one of the many leftists in the Cultural Program and she believes, with great bitterness, as do many other people, that the Agency was responsible for Che Guevara's execution.

In a June 1968 meeting with his manager, Agee learned that the CIA station in Mexico City was "very pleased with his work" and offered him "another promotion", and that his manager "was startled" when hearing of Agee's plans to resign later in the year. Agee said he explained his decision from a purely personal standpoint (so as to not seem like a security risk), i.e., he had met someone, he wanted to remarry and remain in Mexico after the Olympics.

In his diary entries from October 1968—his final ones as a CIA employee—Agee condemned the Mexican government's violence against protesters, and his own complicity in the crackdown. In particular, he cited the Tlatelolco massacre in Mexico City, which cemented his decision to resign.

In his 1983 book KGB Today, John Barron offered a contrasting view, stating that Agee's resignation was forced "for a variety of reasons, including his irresponsible drinking, continuous and vulgar propositioning of embassy wives, and inability to manage his finances". Agee said these claims were ad hominem attacks meant to discredit him.

== Allegations of links to foreign intelligence ==
Russian exile Oleg Kalugin, former head of the KGB's Counterintelligence Directorate, alleged that in 1973 Agee approached the KGB's resident in Mexico City and offered a "treasure trove of information". According to Kalugin, the KGB was too suspicious to accept the offer.

Kalugin writes that Agee then went to the Cubans, who "welcomed him with open arms". The Cubans shared Agee's information with the KGB, but Kalugin continued to regret the missed opportunity to have direct access to this asset.

According to Mitrokhin, while Agee was writing Inside the Company, the KGB kept in contact with him through a London correspondent of the Novosti News Agency.

Agee was accused of receiving up to US$1 million in payments from the Cuban intelligence service. He denied the accusations, which were first made by a high-ranking Cuban intelligence officer and defector in a 1992 Los Angeles Times report.

A later Los Angeles Times article claimed that Agee posed as a CIA Inspector General staff member in order to target a member of the CIA Mexico City station on behalf of Cuban intelligence. According to this story, Agee was identified during a meeting by a CIA case officer.

Vasili Mitrokhin's KGB files allege that Inside the Company was "prepared by Service A, together with the Cubans". Mitrokhin's notes however do not indicate what the KGB and DGI contributed to Agee's text. Mitrokhin further reports that Agee removed all references to CIA penetration of Latin American Communist parties from his typescript before publication at the request of Service A.

In July 1978, Agee began publishing CovertAction Information Bulletin (CAIB). Mitrokhin's files claim the Bulletin was founded on the KGB's initiative, that the group running it was "put together" by First Chief Directorate counter-intelligence, and that Agee was the only group member who was aware of KGB or DGI involvement. According to the files, KGB headquarters assembled a team to keep CAIB supplied with material specifically designed to compromise the CIA. A document titled Director of Central Intelligence: Perspectives for Intelligence, 1976-1981 was provided to Agee by the KGB. Agee highlighted in his commentary Director of Central Intelligence William Colby's complaint that the CAIB was among the most serious problems facing the CIA. Also from Mitrokhin's files: For Dirty Work 2: The CIA in Africa (1979), Agee met with Oleg Maksimovich Nechiporenko and A.N. Istkov of the KGB, and they gave him a list of CIA officers working in Africa; but that he decided to not identify himself as one of the book's authors, out of fear he would lose his residence permit in West Germany.

To the end of his life, Agee consistently and categorically denied ever having worked for any foreign intelligence service after leaving the CIA. He said he was motivated by conscience and not by pursuit of personal gain. In support of this, he adduces the relentless persecution he endured from the CIA, as it and the U.S. State Department revoked his passport and succeeded in having him deported from several Western European countries, one after the other, until he finally found refuge in Cuba.

== Inside the Company: CIA Diary ==
Agee's memoir of his time in the CIA was titled Inside the Company: CIA Diary. Because of legal problems in the United States, Inside the Company was first published in 1975 in Britain, while Agee was living in London. The book was delayed for six months before being published in the U.S.; it was an immediate bestseller, eventually translated into 20 languages. He became an internationally known whistle-blower and a hero of the left.

In a Playboy magazine interview after the book's publication, Agee said: "Millions of people all over the world had been killed or at least had their lives destroyed by the CIA... I couldn't just sit by and do nothing." In the book's "Acknowledgments", he wrote: "Representatives of the Communist Party of Cuba also gave me important encouragement at a time when I doubted that I would be able to find the additional information I needed."

The London Evening News called Inside the Company: CIA Diary "a frightening picture of corruption, pressure, assassination and conspiracy". The Economist called the book "inescapable reading". Miles Copeland, Jr., a former CIA station chief in Cairo, said the book was "as complete an account of spy work as is likely to be published anywhere" and it is "an authentic account of how an ordinary American or British 'case officer' operates... All of it... is presented with deadly accuracy".

The book describes how U.S. embassies in Latin America worked with right-wing death squads, and funded anti-Communist student and labour movement fronts, pro-U.S. political parties and individuals.

Inside the Company identified 250 purported CIA officers and agents. The list of officers and agents, all personally known to Agee, appears in an appendix to the book. While written as a diary, the book actually reconstructs events based on Agee's memory and his subsequent research.

Agee describes his first overseas assignment for the CIA in 1960 to Ecuador, where his primary mission was to force a diplomatic break between Ecuador and Cuba. He writes that the techniques he used included bribery, intimidation, bugging and forgery. Agee spent four years in Ecuador penetrating Ecuadorian politics. He states that his actions subverted and destroyed the political fabric of Ecuador.

Agee helped bug the United Arab Republic code-room in Montevideo, Uruguay, with two contact microphones placed on the ceiling of the room below.

On December 12, 1965, Agee visited senior Uruguayan military and police officers at a Montevideo police headquarters. He realized that the screaming he heard from a nearby cell was the torturing of a Uruguayan, whose name he had given to the police as someone to watch. The Uruguayan senior officers simply turned up a radio report of a soccer game to drown out the screams.

Agee also ran CIA operations within the 1968 Mexico City Olympic Games and he witnessed the events of the Tlatelolco massacre.

Agee identified: President José Figueres Ferrer of Costa Rica, President Luis Echeverría Álvarez (1970–1976) of Mexico and President Alfonso López Michelsen (1974–1978) of Colombia as CIA collaborators or agents.

Following this he details how he resigned from the CIA and began writing the book, conducting research in Cuba, London and Paris. During this time, he said the CIA spied on him. The cover of the book featured an image of the bugged typewriter given to Agee by a CIA agent as part of their surveillance and attempts to stop publication of the book. According to a former CIA officer, David Atlee Phillips, when the CIA discovered that Agee was going to publish a book it began what Phillips refers to as "a program of cauterization", wherein every CIA official and agent known to Agee were "terminated, and some relocated for their safety; and every operation which Agee might have been privy to was being terminated". Phillips says that this cost the Agency millions of dollars.

In response to Agee's book, and to the disclosing of covert CIA agents in the "Naming Names" column of CAIB, the United States Congress would pass the 1982 Intelligence Identities Protection Act, which made it a crime to intentionally reveal the identity of a covert intelligence officer. Use of the law was later considered during the 2003 Valerie Plame affair.

== Expulsion ==
Agee garnered attention from the United Kingdom media after the publication of Inside the Company. He revealed the identities of dozens of CIA agents in the CIA London station. After numerous requests from the American government as well as an MI6 report that blamed Agee's work for the execution of two MI6 agents in Poland, a request was put in to deport Agee from the UK. Agee fought this and was supported by MPs and journalists. The Labour MP Stan Newens promoted a parliamentary bill, gaining the support of more than 50 of his colleagues, which called for the CIA station in London to be expelled. The activity in support of Agee did not prevent his eventual deportation from the UK on June 3, 1977, when he traveled to the Netherlands. Agee was also eventually expelled from the Netherlands, France, West Germany and Italy.

On January 12, 1975, Agee testified before the second Bertrand Russell Tribunal in Brussels that in 1960 he had conducted personal name-checks of Venezuelan employees for a Venezuelan subsidiary of what is now ExxonMobil. Exxon was "letting the CIA assist in employment decisions, and my guess is that those name checks... are continuing to this day". Agee stated that the CIA customarily performed this service for subsidiaries of large U.S. corporations throughout Latin America. An Exxon spokesman denied Agee's accusations.

In 1978, Agee and a small group of his supporters began publishing the CovertAction Information Bulletin (CAIB), which promoted "a worldwide campaign to destabilize the CIA through exposure of its operations and personnel". Mitrokhin states that CAIB had help from both the KGB and the Cuban DGI. The January 1979 issue of the Bulletin published the infamous FM 30-31B, which was claimed by the United States House Intelligence Committee to be a hoax produced by the Soviet intelligence services. In 1978, Agee co-edited with Louis Wolf a book entitled Dirty Work: The CIA in Western Europe. A follow-up book, Dirty Work 2: The CIA in Africa, was published the next year. The two volumes contained information on 2,000 CIA personnel.

Agee told Swiss journalist Peter Studer: "The CIA is plainly on the wrong side, that is, the capitalistic side. I approve KGB activities, communist activities in general. Between the overdone activities that the CIA initiates and the more modest activities of the KGB, there is absolutely no comparison."

Agee's U.S. passport was revoked by the U.S. government in 1979. The State Department offered him an administrative hearing to challenge the passport revocation, but Agee instead sued in federal court. The case reached the Supreme Court, which ruled against Agee in 1981.

In 1980, Maurice Bishop's government conferred citizenship of Grenada on Agee, and he took up residence on that island. The collapse of the Grenada Revolution eliminated that safe haven, and Agee then received a passport from the Sandinista government in Nicaragua. After a change of government there, this passport was revoked in 1990. He next obtained a German passport, in accordance with the working status of his wife, the American ballet dancer Giselle Roberge, who was working and living in Germany at the time. Agee was later readmitted to both the U.S. and United Kingdom. He recounted this period of his life in On the Run.

== Later activities ==
In the 1980s, NameBase founder Daniel Brandt taught Agee how to use computers and computer databases for his research. Agee lived with his wife principally in Hamburg, Germany and Havana, Cuba, founding the "Cubalinda.com" travel website in the 1990s.

U.S. President George H.W. Bush, who considered Agee a traitor, accused him of being responsible for the murder of the head of the CIA Station in Athens, Richard Welch, by the Revolutionary Organization 17 November. Bush had directed the CIA from 1976 to 1977. Agee and his friends rejected Bush's assertion about Welch. When this accusation was included in Barbara Bush's 1994 memoir, Agee sued her for libel. Barbara Bush agreed to remove the allegation from the paperback edition of her book as part of a legal settlement.

On December 16, 2007, Philip Agee was admitted to a hospital in Havana, and surgery was performed on him for perforated ulcers. On January 9, 2008, his wife Giselle announced that he had died in Cuba on January 7 and was cremated.

After his death, Agee's widow gathered up all of his papers from his Havana apartment and had them sent to New York University's Tamiment Library, as a donation to the Robert F. Wagner Labor Archives. According to Jonathan Stevenson, during the transport to NYU, the CIA "seized the papers, combed through all of them, and confiscated an appreciable number of documents before allowing the shipment to proceed to New York".

== Bibliography ==
Articles

- "Why I Split the C.I.A. and Spilled the Beans". (Archived copy) Esquire, June 1975. Full issue available.
- "Where Myths Lead To Murder". CovertAction Information Bulletin, No. 1, July 1988. (pp. 4–7) Full issue available.
- "A Friendly Interview". CovertAction Information Bulletin, No. 19, Spring–Summer 1983. (pp. 33–34) Full issue available.
- "On Torture as an Instrument of Policy". Social Justice. 17 (4). Winter 1990.
- "Changes in Eastern Europe". CovertAction Information Bulletin, No. 35, Fall 1990. (pp. 3–4) Full issue available.

Books

- Inside the Company: CIA Diary. Penguin, 1975. ISBN 0-14-004007-2. 629 pages.
- Dirty Work: The CIA in Western Europe. Edited by Philip Agee, Louis Wolf. Secaucus, N.J.: Lyle Stuart, 1978. ISBN 0-88029-132-X. 318 pages.
- Dirty Work 2: The CIA in Africa. Edited by Ellen Ray, William Schaap, Karl Van Meter, Louis Wolf. Secaucus, N.J.: Lyle Stuart, 1979. ISBN 0-8184-0294-6. 258 pages.
- White Paper Whitewash: Interviews with Philip Agee on the CIA and El Salvador. Edited by Warner Poelchau. Deep Cover Books, 1982. ISBN 0-940380-00-5, OCLC 557663936. 203 pages.
- On the Run. Secaucus, N.J.: Lyle Stuart, 1987. ISBN 0-8184-0419-1. 400 pages.

Introductions and Forewords

- Government by Gunplay: Assassination Conspiracy Theories from Dallas to Today (1976). Blumenthal, Sid; Yazijian, Harvey, eds. "Introduction by Philip Agee". New York: New American Library. LCCN 76-359178.
- CIA: The Pike Report (1977). "Introduction by Philip Agee". Nottingham: Spokesman Books for the Bertrand Russell Peace Foundation. LCCN 78-301398.
- CIA Off Campus: Building the Movement Against Agency Recruitment and Research (1999). Mills, Ami Chen. "Foreword by Philip Agee". South End Press. ISBN 978-0896084032.

Interviews

- "An Interview with Philip Agee: Confessions of an Ex-CIA Man". Ann Arbor Sun, February 28, 1975.

Reports

- The CIA Against Latin America: Special Case: Ecuador. Ministry of Foreign Affairs and Human Mobility (Ecuador), December 2014.

Articles by other authors

- Kaeten Mistry, A Transnational Protest against the National Security State: Whistle-Blowing, Philip Agee, and Networks of Dissent, Journal of American History, Volume 106, Issue 2, September 2019, Pages 362–389
- Shane, Scott. "Philip Agee, 72, Is Dead; Exposed Other C.I.A. Officers" (Obituary). The New York Times, 10 January 2008.
- Agee, Chris John. "Bridging the Gap: Philip Agee, 1935–2008". NACLA Report on the Americas, January/February 2009. pp. 9–13.
- "Remembering Philip Agee". Socialism & Democracy Online, 6 March 2011.

Talks given by Melvin Wulf, William Schaap, and Len Weinglass at a memorial for Philip Agee held at the West Side Y in New York City, on May 3, 2009.

== Filmography ==
Documentaries

- Fidel: The Untold Story. Directed by Estela Bravo. First Run/Icarus Films, 2001. OCLC 52742983. 91 min.
  - Commentary provided by interviews with Agee.
- On Company Business. Directed by Allan Francovich. 1980. 2h 54min. IMDb

Television

- Alternative Views, with Frank Morrow & Douglas Kellner.
  - Episode 540: The Company and the Country: A Conversation with Phil Agee, Pt. 1 (November 1995)
  - Episode 541: The Company and the Country: A Conversation with Phil Agee, Pt. 2 (November 1995)
  - Episode 445: Philip Agee Looks at the Gulf War (May 1991)
    - Speech recorded April, 1991 at MIT.

Public Speaking

- Testimony at the 14th World Festival for Youth and Students in Havana regarding US terrorism against Cuba. Alternative Views, 1997.

== See also ==
- William Blum
- CounterSpy
- Victor Marchetti
- Ralph McGehee
- Lindsay Moran
- Clive Ponting
- L. Fletcher Prouty
- William Schaap
- Frank Snepp
- Edward Snowden
- John Stockwell
- Peter Wright
