= Julius Mader =

German jurist, political scientist, journalist and writer

- Born: 7 October 1928; Radejčín, Czechoslovakia
- Died: 17 May 2000 (aged 71); Berlin, Germany
- Occupations: Writer, Journalist & Lawyer
- Political party: SED

Julius Mader (7 October 1928 – 17 May 2000), also known as Thomas Bergner, was a German journalist, writer, and political scientist who wrote extensively on espionage.

== Early life ==
Mader came from a lower-middle-class family. His family was forcibly relocated in 1945, ending up in the Soviet occupation zone of what remained of Germany, a region in the process of becoming the German Democratic Republic.

Mader attended business college, followed by an apprenticeship as a draper. He studied government and law, economics and journalism at the Universities of Berlin and Jena, the Institute of Internal Trade in Leipzig, and the German Academy for Political and Legal Science in Potsdam-Babelsberg.

== Career ==
In 1955, he completed a Master of Business Travelers. A member of the SED, from 1958-59 he was deputy managing editor at a magazine. From 1960, he began working as a freelance writer. From 1962, he served as officer on special assignment with the code name "Faingold" for the Stasi. In 1965, he earned his doctorate from the "Walter Ulbricht" Law Academy ("Deutsche Akademie für Staats- und Rechtswissenschaft "Walter Ulbricht"") at Potsdam-Babelsberg for "The secret services of the German Federal Republic and their subversive activities against the German Democratic Republic". In 1970, he received his habilitation (higher academic qualification) from the Humboldt University of Berlin, for work co-authored with Albert Charisius on the development, system and operation of the German secret service.

Mader's military and political writings covered the period of the Nazi era and the Cold War. His books have a circulation of several million, including translations. He was the author of the book Who's Who in the CIA, which has been identified as an "active measure" of disinformation.
