= Fidel: The Untold Story =

2001 film by Estela Bravo

- Directed by: Estela Bravo
- Produced by: Alan Fountain; Silvia Steven
- Starring: Fidel Castro
- Production company: Faction films
- Release date: 2001
- Running time: 91 minutes
- Country: United States
- Languages: English, Spanish

Fidel: The Untold Story is a documentary released in 2001 by Estela Bravo. The film received mixed reviews and has been criticized for its lack of neutrality, portraying Castro solely in a positive light.

The film features interviews with:

- Phillip Agee
- Muhammad Ali
- Harry Belafonte
- Ramsey Clark
- Angela Davis
- Elián González
- Nelson Mandela
- Gabriel García Márquez
- Ted Turner
- Alice Walker
