= CounterSpy (magazine) =

American magazine

CounterSpy was an American magazine that published articles on covert operations, especially those undertaken by the American government. It was the official Bulletin of the Committee for Action/Research on the Intelligence Community (CARIC). CounterSpy published 32 issues between 1973 and 1984 from its headquarters in Washington DC.

It was continued by The National Reporter starting in 1985.

== Personnel ==
Former Central Intelligence Agency personnel Victor Marchetti, Philip Agee, and Stanley Sheinbaum joined CounterSpy's advisory board aimed at mitigating some of the pressure being exerted by the magazine towards the CIA.

CounterSpy was edited by Tim Butz and Winslow Peck.

By April 1979, Philip Agee was no longer associated with CounterSpy in any capacity, his only institutional relationship at that point being with CovertAction Information Bulletin.

Advisory board

- Fred Branfman, Co-Director, Indochina Resource Center.
- Sylvia Crane, Author, National Committee Against Repressive Legislation.
- Dave Dellinger, Liberation Magazine.
- Dr. Ralph Lewis, Criminal Justice Research Director, Michigan State University.
- Victor Marchetti, Author, former agent, Central Intelligence Agency.
- K. Barton Osborn, former agent, military intelligence and Central Intelligence Agency.
- Col. L. Fletcher Prouty (ret.), Author, former military liaison, Central Intelligence Agency.
- Marcus Raskin, Co-Director, Institute for Policy Studies.
- Kirkpatrick Sale, Author.
- Stanley Sheinbaum, American Civil Liberties Union.
- William Turner, Author, former agent, Federal Bureau of Investigation.

== Outing CIA operatives ==
The magazine gained attention when CounterSpy founder and former Central Intelligence Agency agent Philip Agee advocated outing agents in their Winter 1975 issue. Agee urged the "neutralization of its [CIA] people working abroad" by publicizing their names so that they could no longer operate clandestinely.

The station chief in Costa Rica, Joseph F. Fernandez, first appeared in CounterSpy in 1975. However, the 1975 murder of Richard Welch, the CIA Station Chief in Greece, by Revolutionary Organization 17 November was blamed by some on disclosures in magazines such as CounterSpy. Agee denied the accusation that he had leaked Welch's name.

Though U.S. officials, including then-CIA Director George H. W. Bush, blamed CounterSpy for contributing to Welch's death, Welch was previously named as a CIA officer by several European publications, and the CIA had assigned him a house previously used by CIA station chiefs. Congress cited the Welch assassination as the principal justification for passing the Intelligence Identities Protection Act in 1982 making the willful identification of a CIA officer a criminal offense.

== See also ==
- Cryptome
- CovertAction Quarterly
- Executive Intelligence Review
- Intelligence Online
- Lobster (magazine)
- Philip Agee
