= Richard Welch =

United States intelligence officer and murder victim (1929–1975)

Richard Skeffington Welch
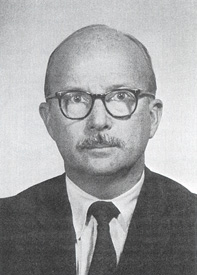
- Richard Welch
- Born: Richard Skeffington Welch; December 14, 1929; Hartford, Connecticut, U.S.
- Died: December 23, 1975 (aged 46); Athens, Greece
- Resting place: Arlington National Cemetery, Arlington, Virginia, US
- Occupations: CIA official (Chief of Station, Athens)
- Employer: Central Intelligence Agency

Richard Skeffington Welch (December 14, 1929 – December 23, 1975) was a career Central Intelligence Agency officer. He was the Chief of Station (COS) in Athens, Greece, when he was assassinated by the Revolutionary Organization 17 November (17N). His assassination led to the passage of the Intelligence Identities Protection Act, making it a crime to expose or identify officers working in covert roles who had not officially been acknowledged as such by the U.S. government.

== Early life and CIA career ==
Welch, who was born in Hartford, Connecticut, was recruited to the CIA in 1951 upon graduation from Harvard, where he studied classics. His first assignment as a case officer was in Athens working as a civilian employee of the U.S. Department of the Army (1952–59). From 1960–64, he served in Cyprus, and then in Guatemala (1965–67), Guyana as COS (1967–69), Mexico (1969–72) and Peru as chief of staff (1972–75). His service in Greece in the 1960s allegedly influenced the outcome of elections in Greece.

He arrived in Athens, Greece, in July 1975, at a time when Greece had just come out of a period of dictatorship under the country's military junta. Welch stayed in the house occupied by several of his predecessors as chief of the CIA station. The night of December 23, 1975, five men in a stolen Simca automobile followed him home as he returned from a Christmas party. While two men covered his wife and driver, a third shot him dead with a .45 Colt M1911 pistol at close range. Welch's name and address had been published in the Athens News and Eleftherotypia in November 1975. However, a communiqué sent by 17N to the French newspaper Libération in March 1976 demonstrated that the group had been watching Welch's movements since the summer of 1975.

== Public exposure as a CIA agent ==
By 1968, Welch had been publicly identified as a CIA agent in the magazine, CounterSpy, and in a book attributed to two Soviet bloc intelligence agents, Who's Who in the CIA. Former CIA agent Philip Agee published two books revealing the names of more than 1,000 alleged CIA officers in Europe and Africa, resulting in the revocation of Agee's passport – see Haig v. Agee. "The practice of naming CIA agents allegedly led directly to the 1975 assassination of CIA station chief Richard Welch in Greece."

Outraged by Agee’s actions, Congress passed the Intelligence Identities Protection Act (1982), which criminalized the disclosure of identities of CIA agents.

== Legacy and aftermath ==
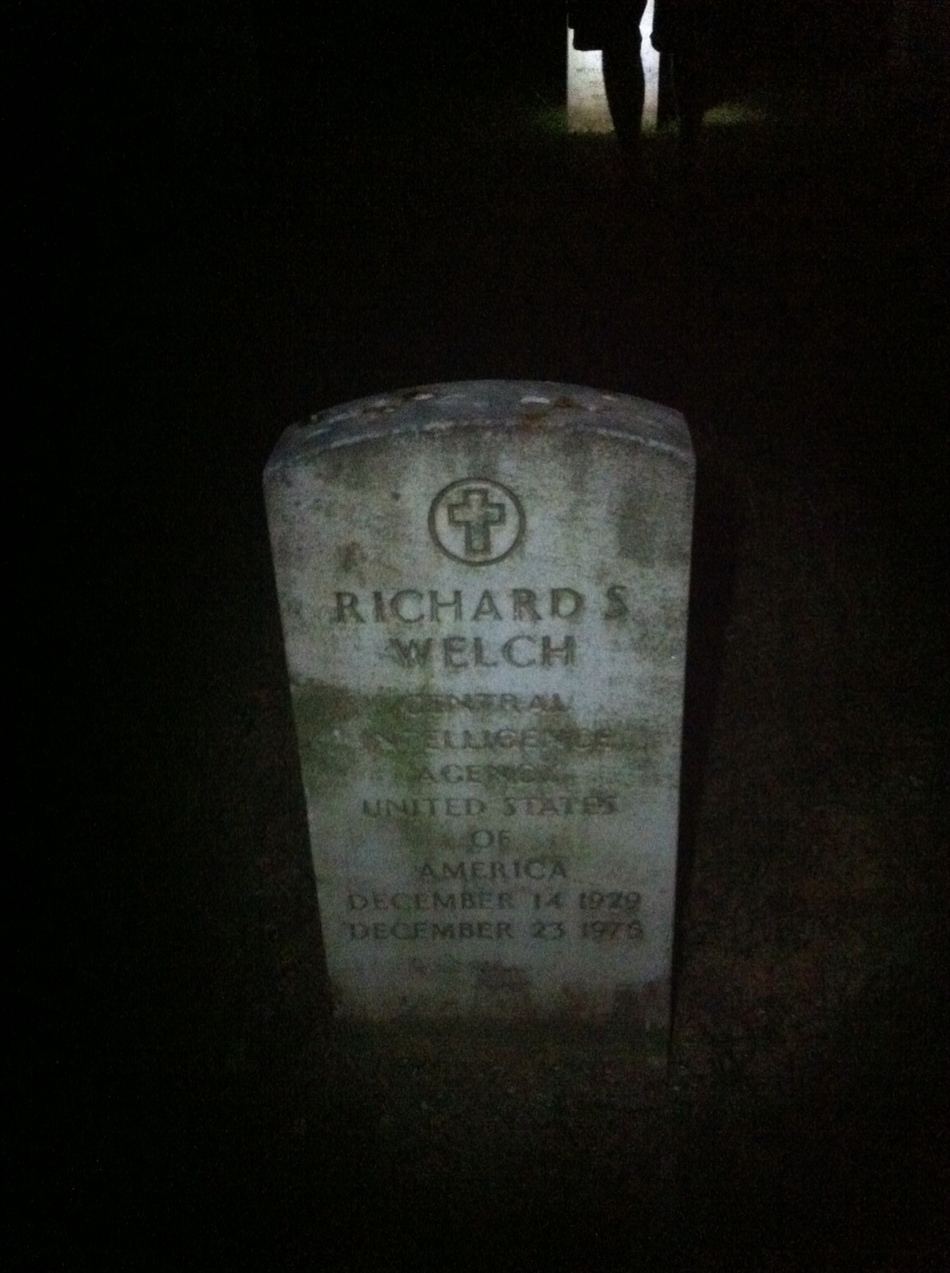
Grave at Arlington National Cemetery

By presidential order of U.S. President Gerald Ford, Welch was buried in Arlington National Cemetery. His death helped turn the political tide back in favor of the CIA after the damning revelations by the Church Committee earlier in 1975.

Welch's murder contributed to passage of the Intelligence Identities Protection Act of 1982, making it illegal to reveal the name of an agent who has a covert relationship with an American intelligence organization.

In July 2002, a hospital employee named Pavlos Serifis (born 1956) confessed that he had participated in Welch's murder along with 17N's mastermind Alexandros Giotopoulos (born 1944), Pavlos's uncle Ioannis Serifis (born 1938), and a tall, blonde "Anna."

Charges for the Welch murder were not brought because the (then) 20-year statute of limitations had expired. Giotopoulos was sentenced to multiple life terms in 2003 as the moral instigator of a string of assassinations, bombings, rocket attacks, and bank robberies from 1983 to 2000. Ioannis Serifis was acquitted. Pavlos Serifis was convicted of membership in a terrorist group but released on health grounds. An appeals court ruled in 2007 that the statute of limitations had expired for that crime.

== Conspiracy theory ==
It was rumored that Welch was assassinated under the order of Aristotle Onassis because Welch acknowledged Onassis' implication in the assassination of both John F. Kennedy and Robert F. Kennedy. Onassis died on March 15, 1975, but conspiracy theorists propose that the Welch assassination plan was resumed by his daughter Christina in December 1975.

== In fiction ==
His death is mentioned in Man Booker Prize winner A Brief History of Seven Killings by Marlon James.

== See also ==
- Metapolitefsi, the period of Greek history during which Welch was murdered.

== Sources ==
- Greek Assassins Arrested, Association of Former Intelligence Officers, Weekly Intelligence Notes #31-02 5 August 2002.
- Philip Agee and Louis Wolf (1978). Dirty Work: The CIA in Western Europe. Dorset Press. ISBN 978-0880291323.
- W. Thomas Smith – Encyclopedia of the Central Intelligence Agency
