= The Sports Reporters =

American sports talk TV show

- Starring: Gary Thorne (1988); Dick Schaap (1988–2001); John Saunders (2001–2016); Mike Lupica (2016–2017); Jeremy Schaap (2024–current)
- Country of origin: United States

Production
- Production locations: Manhattan (1988–2010); Bristol, Connecticut (2010–2017)
- Running time: 30 min.

Original release
- Network: ESPN (1988–2017); Compass Media Networks (podcast, 2017–2022)
- Release: October 2, 1988

The Sports Reporters is a sports talk show that aired on ESPN at 9:30 a.m. ET every Sunday morning (and replayed at 10:30 a.m. ET the same day on ESPN2 and 11:30 AM on ESPNews). It featured a roundtable discussion among four sports media personalities, with one regular host and three rotating guests. The show began in 1988, patterned to some extent after the Chicago-based syndicated show called Sportswriters on TV.

The show was originally broadcast from a studio in Manhattan, and from 1999 to 2010 it was recorded at the ESPN Zone at Times Square in Manhattan before it closed. It then moved to Bristol, Connecticut at the main ESPN studios, where it stayed until the end of its run. On January 23, 2017, ESPN announced its planned cancellation, following the death of host John Saunders. The final episode aired May 7, 2017. The show would return in the form of a podcast in September 2017, which was produced by Compass Media Networks until March 2022. The Sports Reporters returned to ESPN on the ESPN YouTube channel on September 3, 2024, hosted by Jeremy Schaap.

== Hosts and panelists ==
The Sports Reporters first aired in 1988 and was originally hosted by Gary Thorne, who was replaced by Dick Schaap later that year. Following Schaap's death in 2001, he was replaced by John Saunders, who hosted it until his own death in 2016.

The first year featured four rotating panelists, but afterwards there were three rotating panel members. Regular panelists included Mike Lupica of the New York Daily News, John Feinstein of The Washington Post, Mitch Albom of the Detroit Free Press, Michael Wilbon also from the Washington Post, Bob Ryan of the Boston Globe, William C. Rhoden of The New York Times, Ralph Wiley of Sports Illustrated and Stephen A. Smith of ESPN. Despite reports to the contrary, Dick Jerardi of the Philadelphia Inquirer never appeared on the program.

Former panelists included Marcos Breton of The Sacramento Bee, Jason Whitlock of Fox Sports 1, Christine Brennan of USA Today, Tony Kornheiser of The Washington Post, Mike Downey of the Los Angeles Times, Roy S. Johnson of The New York Times and Sports Illustrated, Bill Conlin of the Philadelphia Daily News and Bryan Burwell of the St. Louis Post Dispatch. As the show was based in New York City and then Bristol, Connecticut, the panelists were usually from the northeastern portion of the United States. For a long time, there were no women serving as regular panelists on the show, but in celebration of Title IX, one show in 2005 included three female sports journalists. In the show's later years, Selena Roberts of The New York Times and ESPN's Jemele Hill had made regular appearances on the show. The August 28, 2016, episode of the show made history with an all female edition of The Sports Reporters, with Hill as the moderator and fellow ESPN reporters Sarah Spain, Kate Fagan, and Jane McManus on the panel.

When Saunders was on assignment or unable to host due to illness, Lupica was usually the designated substitute host and became the permanent host. Dick's son Jeremy Schaap also guest-hosted on occasion.

=== September 16, 2001 ===
The show was expanded to an hour to cover the sports perspective from the September 11 attacks. It also proved to be Dick Schaap's last show as he underwent hip replacement surgery and later died from complications. In fact, he delayed the surgery in order to be on that show.

=== November 15, 2015 ===
The show covered the sports perspective from the November 2015 Paris attacks and how the attacks had an impact in the security system in sports facilities.

=== Death of Saunders ===
Host John Saunders died unexpectedly on August 10, 2016, at the age of 61. The August 14 episode, hosted by Mike Lupica, featured tributes to Saunders by the panelists.

=== Conclusion ===
After nearly 30 years on ESPN, the final episode of The Sports Reporters aired on May 7, 2017, with Lupica hosting, and Ryan, Rhoden, and Albom as the panelists.

=== Relaunch ===
The show relaunched on the ESPN YouTube channel on September 3, 2024, with Jeremy Schaap in the host role featuring Joe Buck (ESPN), Mike Tirico (NBC), Ian Eagle (CBS) and Kevin Harlan (CBS and Westwood One Sports).

== The Sports Reporters II ==
The Sports Reporters II was a spin-off launched in 2002, which used the same format as the original program but emphasized the inclusion of online reporters rather than the traditional newspaper writers featured in the original. Jack Ford served as host. It aired until 2004.

== Podcast ==
On September 8, 2017, The Sports Reporters relaunched as a twice weekly podcast co-hosted by Albom and Lupica with a rotating cast of the top sports writers in the business, including former panelists from the original ESPN program. It is produced through Compass Media Networks, rather than ESPN. The podcast ceased producing episodes following the March 31, 2022 podcast.
