= Dean Benedetti =

American jazz musician

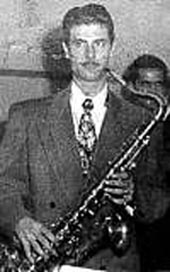

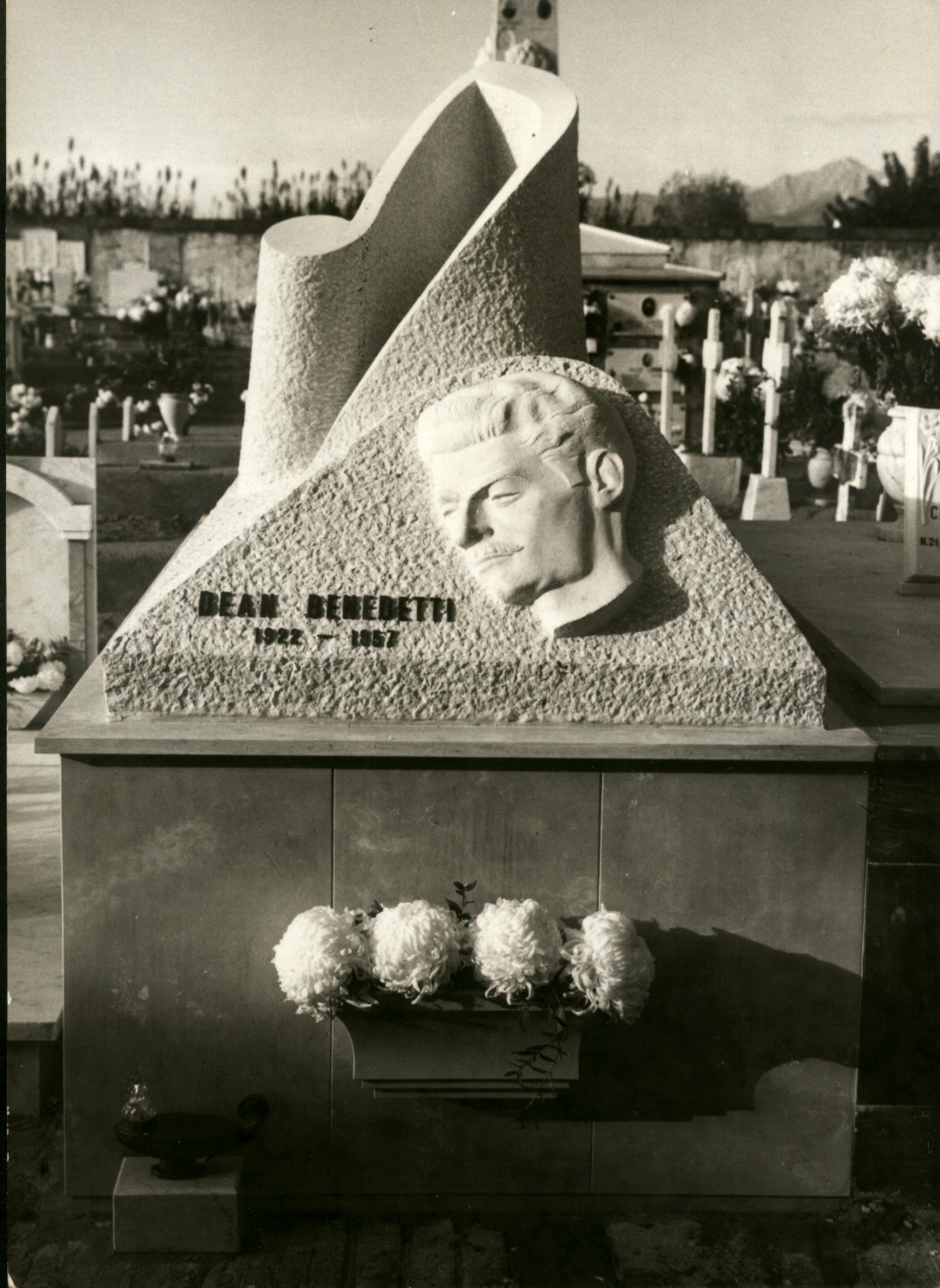
Jazz player Dean Benedetti tomb in Torre del Lago (Italy)

Dean Benedetti (born Dino Alipio Benedetti, June 28, 1922 - January 20, 1957) was a saxophone player known for the amateur live recordings he made of fellow saxophonist Charlie Parker.

== Biography ==
As a tenor saxophonist and band leader in California, Benedetti first heard a record of Parker in the spring of 1945. Deeply influenced by what he heard, Benedetti began to study Parker, transcribing solos, building them into set pieces, and working bop into his own playing.

A two-week engagement at Los Angeles's Hi-De-Ho Club in early 1947, recorded on discs, was the start of Benedetti's pursuit of Parker. In 1948, Benedetti headed to New York with bandmate Jimmy Knepper, and recorded Charlie Parker on March 31, and July 7, both of these on a Sears tape recorder.

While in New York, Benedetti began to use heroin. Unable to break into the New York music scene, he returned to his parents' home in California in 1948. Trying to finance their way back to the East Coast, Benedetti and Knepper attempted to sell drugs. However, Knepper took the drugs with him back to LA and abandoned Benedetti in New York.

Shortly after returning to California, Benedetti discovered he had a rare muscle disease, Myasthenia Gravis. The disease affected his playing, and he soon quit performing in public. The disease ruined his health, and in 1953 he moved in with his parents in Italy. He died on January 20, 1957, at the age of 34.

== Issue of Parker recordings ==
The jazz historian Phil Schaap in a 2008 New Yorker article described the Benedetti recordings of Parker's performances as existing for many years as a jazz legend (they were long elusive) similar to the myth of an undiscovered Buddy Bolden cylinder. One of Parker's record producers Ross Russell of the Dial label, in his novel The Sound (1961) wrote of a failed musician he called Royo who recorded Parker and supplied him with heroin and alcohol. In his unreliable Parker biography Bird Lives! (1973), Russell used Benedetti's real name, but repeated his fictionalized assertions, and inaccurately claimed Benedetti recorded Parker without approval.

Benedetti's surviving brother Rigoletto "Rick" Benedetti contacted Michael Cuscuna of Mosaic Records and informed Cuscuna the acetate discs and tapes existed. Purchased by Mosaic for $15,000, Benedetti's archive comprised 53 78-rpm acetate discs and 14 reels of paper-based tape. Produced by Phil Schaap and Bob Porter, the set took three years to assemble. Benedetti's paper-backed tapes had dried out and were in a fragile state. Schaap used Wite-Out, a brand of correction fluid, on the reverse of the tapes (where necessary) to strengthen them. Initially the tapes, reportedly eight miles in total length, could not be played without breaking.

The Complete Dean Benedetti Recordings of Charlie Parker, a 10 LP or 7 CD box-set, was released by Mosaic in 1990. Leonard Feather wrote in the Los Angeles Times that "the sound quality inevitably is pre-digital, pre-stereo, prehistoric", but wrote the set "can be recommended unreservedly to Bird-lorists for selective, non-continuous listening." By 2008, Mosaic had sold 5,000 copies of the box-set.
