= Phil Schaap =

American jazz disc jockey (1951–2021)

- Born: Philip van Noorden Schaap; April 8, 1951
- Died: September 7, 2021 (aged 70)
- Education: Columbia University (BA, 1973)
- Relatives: Dick Schaap (cousin); William Schaap (cousin); Jeremy Schaap (nephew)

Philip van Noorden Schaap (April 8, 1951 – September 7, 2021) was an American radio host, who specialized in jazz as a broadcaster, historian, archivist, and producer. He hosted an assortment of jazz programs at WKCR and WNYC in New York City and WBGO in Newark, N.J. He began presenting jazz shows on Columbia University's WKCR in 1970, and hosted Bird Flight and Traditions In Swing on WKCR for 40 years, shows which are broadcast in archival versions to this day, beginning in 1981. He received six Grammy Awards over the course of his career.

== Early years ==
Schaap was born in Queens, New York, on April 8, 1951. He was raised in the Hollis neighborhood. An only child, he was raised by jazz-loving parents. His father was Walter Schaap, an early jazz historian, translator and discographer. His mother, Marjorie Wood Schaap, worked as a librarian and was a classically trained pianist. At Radcliffe, she listened to Louis Armstrong records and smoked a corncob pipe.

Schaap was friendly with many jazz musicians from a young age. He would see the saxophonist Budd Johnson every day at the bus stop. He was fond of the members of the original Count Basie Orchestra, knocking on Buck Clayton's front door, as well as visiting Milt Hinton's home unannounced. Backstage with his mother at Randall’s Island Jazz Festival in August 1956, he first met Basie's drummer, Jo Jones, who asked if he knew of Prince Robinson (a tenor player for McKinney's Cotton Pickers several decades earlier). Schaap passed the test and when Jones offered to baby sit for him, his father dropped him off at Jones's Manhattan apartment. They watched cartoons together and listened to Basie records with Jones elaborating on what they were hearing.

By the 1950s, many leading African American musicians had moved into residential areas such as Hollis in Queens which helped an emerging jazz enthusiast. In the first grade, Schaap tried to persuade Carole Eldridge, the daughter of trumpeter Roy Eldridge, to introduce him to her father, but only succeeded via her mother. Walter, Schaap's own father, at first disbelieved reports his young son (then 6 years old) was approaching major jazz musicians, explaining in 2001 that he rarely had sufficient courage himself. In his early teens, Schaap managed to gain a lift into Manhattan from Basie himself during the 1966 subway strike and amazed him with his recall of his orchestra's members and their repertory. "There isn’t anyone in the country who knows more about this music than he [does]", Max Roach told The New York Times in 2001. "He knows more about us than we know about ourselves."

== Education and early career ==
Schaap attended Columbia University as a history major. On February 2, 1970, he began broadcasting jazz on the Columbia University radio station, WKCR-FM. He graduated from Columbia in 1973.

From around the time he began as a student-radio disc jockey, he was running the jazz program at The West End Bar on 114th street across Broadway from WKCR's studios, gaining work for swing era musicians he had known for years who were by then under-employed. The West End had a side bar called the Jazz Room where musicians hung out. On a nightly basis, he booked prominent swing-band alumni providing them—as he put it in a 2017 interview with The West Side Spirit—"with a nice last chapter of their lives". He said the West End series was among his proudest accomplishments. "A lot of them were not even performing anymore", he said of the alto saxophonist Earle Warren, the trombonist Dicky Wells and the many other musicians he put onstage there. "They were my friends", he added. "They were my teachers. They were geniuses." Among those he booked were The Countsmen, a Basie alumni band which he managed featuring Warren and Wells, Russell Procope's Ellingtonia, Franc Williams, George Kelly, Eddie Barefield, Sonny Greer, Benny Waters, Jo Jones, Buddy Tate, Vic Dickenson, Harold Ashby, Big Nick Nicholas, Ronnie Cole, Eddie Durham, Percy France and "Doc" Cheatham. He also booked modern jazz artists, such as Lee Konitz and Joe Albany, and blues artists like Big Joe Turner. He also engineered sound for jazz events, including George Wein's Newport Jazz Festival.

== Broadcaster and archivist ==
From 1981, Schaap hosted two shows on WKCR: Bird Flight, broadcast weekday mornings from 8:20 to 9:30, devoted to the music of Charlie Parker. and Traditions In Swing Saturday evenings from 6:00 to 9:00 PM. During each show, he presented long and authoritative essays on musical and recorded details. By 2001, the radio station's archive contained about 5,000 hours of his oral histories and he was reported to have raised about $2 million over the years to help the station continue its broadcasts. He continued as a radio broadcaster for a half-century, until 2020, when the COVID pandemic intervened.

Schaap was commissioned by Michael Cuscuna of Mosaic Records around 1988 to rescue unissued decaying recording of Charlie Parker made by Dean Benedetti forty years earlier. Schaap's work saw the recovery of 461 recorded fragments (Benedetti recorded only Parker, some fragments last only 20 seconds) from 18 nights of Parker's 1947 and 1948 nightclub appearances in Los Angeles and New York. Mosaic issued The Complete Dean Benedetti Recordings of Charlie Parker as a ten lp or seven cd box set in 1990.

From 1984 to 1991, Schaap was the archivist for the Savoy Jazz label. He was involved with the re-issue of other recordings on CD by artists including Miles Davis, Billie Holiday, Benny Goodman, Louis Armstrong, and Duke Ellington. For his efforts in engineering, production, and liner notes, he was nominated for eleven Grammy Awards and won seven, including three for producing, three for historical writing, and one for audio engineering.

These included the 2001 win for Best Historical Album: Louis Armstrong - The Complete Hot Five & Hot Seven Recordings on Columbia, 2000 - two nominations for Best Historical Album: The Complete Jazz At The Philharmonic On Verve 1944 - 1949 and Sony Music 100 Years: Soundtrack For A Century, 1997 - wins for Best Historical album and Best Historical Notes: The Complete Miles Davis & Gil Evans Columbia studio recordings, 1994 - wins for Best Historical Album and Best Historical Notes: The Complete Billie Holiday on Verve 1945–1959 and a win in 1990 for Best Album Notes for Bird - The Complete Charlie Parker On Verve.

== Educator and writer ==
Schaap was in high demand as a jazz educator. He taught jazz at the graduate level at Columbia University and Rutgers University, taught American Studies at Princeton University, and ran graduate level jazz classes for Jazz at Lincoln Center for The Juilliard School from 2006 until his death. He also gave guest lectures and spoke at special events at nearly every university in the area. Upon becoming Curator at Jazz at Lincoln Center, he left a successful career producing, remastering, and writing for record companies such as Polygram, later absorbed by Universal, and Sony.

In addition to his liner notes, Schaap contributed to the 2005 book by Wynton Marsalis, Jazz ABZ: An A to Z Collection of Jazz Portraits.

In 2009, Schaap published the expanded reprint of Terry Waldo's "This is Ragtime", with a new foreword by Wynton Marsalis, under the imprint of Jazz at Lincoln Center Library Editions.

== Honors and other references ==
Schaap was a distinguished member of the Board of Directors Advisory committee of The Jazz Foundation of America.

In October 2020, the National Endowment for the Arts (NEA) announced Schaap as one of four recipients of the NEA Jazz Masters Fellowships, celebrated in an online concert and show on April 22, 2021. The honor, recognizing their lifetime achievements is bestowed on individuals "who have made major contributions to the appreciation, knowledge and advancement of the American jazz art form". The other recipients that year were Terri Lyne Carrington, Albert "Tootie" Heath, and Henry Threadgill.

He was the inspiration for Woody Allen's on-screen character in Allen's film Sweet and Lowdown (1999). The feature film Miles Ahead (2015) contains a scene in which Miles Davis, played by Don Cheadle, calls up WKCR Radio and talks to Phil Schaap on air about Schaap's selection and commentary on Davis's music.

Schaap played a radio announcer in Kurt Vonnegut/Dave Soldier's 2009 "radio opera" A Soldier's Story.

== Personal life ==
Schaap resided in New York City. He married Ellen LaFurn, a schoolteacher, in 1997. She later returned to her former passion of singing jazz professionally. Their marriage was short-lived. He was survived by his partner of 17 years, Susan Shaffer. Sports journalist Dick Schaap was a cousin.

Phil Schaap died on September 7, 2021, at a hospital in Manhattan at the age of 70 after living with lymphoma for four years.

== Awards and honors ==
=== Grammy Awards ===
- Best Album Notes 1990 (album notes writer) for Bird: The Complete Charlie Parker on Verve
- Best Album Notes 1994 (album notes writer) for The Complete Billie Holiday on Verve 1945–1959
- Best Historical Recording 1993 (producer) for The Complete Billie Holiday on Verve 1945–1959
- Best Audio Engineering 1996 (engineer) for Miles Davis & Gil Evans: The Complete Columbia Studio Recordings
- Best Album Notes 1997 (album notes writer) for Miles Davis & Gil Evans: The Complete Columbia Studio Recordings
- Best Historical Recording 1997 (producer & engineer) for Miles Davis & Gil Evans: The Complete Columbia Studio Recordings
- Best Historical Recording 2001 (producer & engineer) for Louis Armstrong: The Complete Hot Five and Hot Seven Recordings
