= CovertAction Quarterly =

American publication focused on CIA activities

CovertAction Quarterly, formerly CovertAction Information Bulletin (CAIB), was an American publication in existence from 1978 to 2005. From its inception, CAIB saw itself as "a watchdog journal that focused on the abuses and activities of the CIA" by reporting on global covert operations. According to the Mitrokhin Archive, CAIB was instigated by a Soviet KGB active measures program.

In 1992, CAIB was renamed CovertAction Quarterly (CAQ). Over the years, the publication broadened its scope beyond intelligence matters to be generally critical of US foreign policy, capitalism, and imperialism. More than a decade after CAQ ceased operations in 2005, it was revived in May 2018 as CovertAction Magazine.

== History and profile ==
=== CovertAction Information Bulletin ===
CAIB was co-founded in 1978 by former CIA officer turned agency critic Philip Agee, along with William Kunstler, Michael Ratner, Ellen Ray, William Schaap, James and Elsie Wilcott, and Louis Wolf. (Note: According to Christopher Andrew (who joined the British intelligence service MI5 in order to create its official history), Mitrokhin Archive documents indicate that CAIB was established "on the initiative of the KGB" and that the group responsible for producing it was "put together" by Soviet counterintelligence. Andrew writes that there is "no evidence" that anybody associated with the publication, apart from Agee, was aware of the KGB's role.) The Bulletin was launched by Agee at a Havana press conference on the eve of the 11th World Festival of Youth and Students.

The new publication was based in Washington, D.C. According to a "Who We Are" column printed in the premier issue in July 1978, CAIB was carrying on the work of CounterSpy magazine, which was said to have been shut down as a result of CIA harassment. Agee declared that the goal of CAIB was "a worldwide campaign to destabilize the CIA through exposure of its operations and personnel."

The publication's "Naming Names" column, which published the names of covert CIA agents, was halted in 1981 due to the imminent passage of the Intelligence Identities Protection Act. The Act would make it a criminal offence to identity covert US intelligence agents.

The Mitrokhin Archive, by ex-KGB archivist Vasili Mitrokhin and British intelligence historian Christopher Andrew, alleged that CAIB received assistance from the Soviet KGB and Cuban DGI. Mitrokhin claimed that a Soviet project (code-named RUPOR) was responsible for the Bulletin, although it cautioned that of the publication's founding members, only Agee would have been aware of the foreign government connection. KGB files recovered by Mitrokhin boasted of their ability to pass information and disinformation to Agee.

=== CovertAction Quarterly ===
Starting with issue #43 in 1992, CovertAction Information Bulletin was rebranded CovertAction Quarterly (CAQ). Contributors to CAIB and CAQ included many well-known critics of US foreign and domestic policy such as Noam Chomsky, Howard Zinn, Michael Parenti, Ramsey Clark, Leonard Peltier, Allen Ginsberg, Laura Flanders, Edward S. Herman, Ward Churchill, and Christopher Hitchens. In May 1998, the Quarterly dismissed several members of its editorial staff. The publication ceased operating in 2005 with issue #78.

An article by Lawrence Soley entitled "Phi Beta Capitalism: Universities in Service to Business", which appeared in the Spring 1997 issue, would later be singled out for distinction by Project Censored. Project Censored named an article by Michel Chossudovsky entitled "Seattle and Beyond: The Illegality of the WTO" as one of the top 25 censored stories of 2001.

Articles from CAQ were collected in two anthologies, CovertAction: The Roots of Terrorism and Bioterror: Manufacturing Wars The American Way, both published by Ocean Press in 2003.

=== CovertAction Magazine ===
In 2018, Louis Wolf resurrected CAQ as CovertAction Magazine.

== Selected personnel ==
- Jim Wilcott, member of the Board of Advisors. He spent nine years with the CIA as a finance officer, and his wife Elsie also worked for the Agency during the same period.

== Publications ==
Anthologies

- CovertAction: The Roots of Terrorism, edited by Ellen Ray & William H. Schaap. Ocean Press (2003). ISBN 978-1876175849. 310 pages. Excerpts.
- Bioterror: Manufacturing Wars the American Way, edited by Ellen Ray & William H. Schaap. Ocean Press (2003). ISBN 978-1876175641. 80 pages.

Magazines

- CovertAction Information Bulletin (1978–1992).
  - Issues no. 1–42.
- CovertAction Quarterly (1992–2005).
  - Issues no. 43–78.
- CovertAction Magazine (2018–present).
  - Issues no. 79–present.

== See also ==
- CounterSpy
- Lobster
