= Alternative Views =

One of the longest running public-access cable TV programs in the USA

Alternative Views was one of the longest running public-access cable TV programs in the United States. Produced in Austin, Texas in 1978, it produced 563 hour-long programs featuring news, interviews and opinion pieces from a progressive political perspective. Show founders and on-air hosts, Douglas Kellner and Frank Morrow, produced the show on virtually no budget using facilities at Austin Community Television (ACTV) and the University of Texas at Austin. They also pioneered an innovative syndication system that placed the program in almost 80 television markets around the country.

== The business ==
=== Audience ===
Viewership was on a par with the local PBS station. Two surveys, one undertaken by the cable company, and another commissioned by it, indicate that from 20,000 to 30,000 Austin viewers watched Alternative Views each week.

=== Distribution ===
The audience for Alternative Views went well beyond the confines of Austin, Texas. Many Public-access television channels allow members to sponsor programs for exhibition in their cable market. In spring 1984 Alternative Views began sending program tapes to Public-access TV contacts in Dallas and San Antonio. In Fall 1984 they added Fayetteville, Atlanta, Minneapolis, Pittsburgh, and Urbana, Illinois. Cities around the United States subsequently joined, and, by the late 1980s, the program was shown in New York, Boston, Portland, San Diego, Marin County, California, Fairfax and Arlington Virginia, Cincinnati, San Francisco, Columbus, Ohio, New Haven, and many other cities.

== The people ==
Each installment of Alternative Views included a regular news section that utilized material from mostly non-mainstream news sources to provide stories ignored by establishment media, or interpretations of events different from the mainstream.

=== Staff ===
Alternative Views was staffed exclusively by volunteers, many of whom have become influential filmmakers and television producers. It was founded by Douglas Kellner and Frank Morrow at the University of Texas at Austin. (Kellner is now a chair at UCLA.) There were other producers and hosts, many of whom were drawn from Kellner's philosophy courses, including Ali Hossaini, Tommy Pallotta, Noah Khoshbin, Richard Linklater, Steven Best, James Scott and Danny Postel.

=== Guests ===
Alternative Views landed many significant interviews during its run, and it was often ahead of mainstream media in identifying major stories. Its first program featured an Iranian student who discussed opposition to the Shah of Iran and the possibility of his overthrow. It also had a detailed discussion of the Sandinista movement struggling to overthrow Anastasio Somoza. It would be several weeks before national broadcast media discovered these movements.

Early shows included long-form interviews with Senator Ralph Yarborough, a Texas progressive responsible for legislation like the National Defense Education Act, and then–Congressman and Libertarian presidential hopeful Ron Paul. Morrow and Kellner used their platform to give a platform to disillusioned CIA officials in flight from the agency, such as Philip Agee and Angola Station Chief John Stockwell. Both men took advantage of their opportunity to set the record straight as they deemed fit.

Other interviewees included:

- Anti-war and anti-nuclear activists like Helen Caldicott, George Wald, Ramsey Clark, Daniel Ellsberg, Michael Klare, David Dellinger, and representatives of the European peace movement.
- US New Left activists like David MacReynolds, Stokely Carmichael, Greg Calvert, and Dr. Benjamin Spock.
- Feminists, gay activists, union activists, and representatives of local progressive groups appeared on the show; and officials from the Soviet Union, Nicaragua, Allende's former government in Chile, the democratic front in El Salvador, and many other Third World countries and revolutionary movements.

In addition, Alternative Views broadcast many documentaries, both self-produced and produced by others,(including one about the assassination of John F. Kennedy) and it screened raw video footage of the bombing of Lebanon and aftermath of the Sabra and Shatila massacre, of the assassinations of five communist labor organizers by the Ku Klux Klan in Greensboro, North Carolina, and of counterrevolutionary activity in Nicaragua.

== Video links ==
The Internet Archive hosts a growing collection of Alternative Views videos. By June, 2008, over 200 programs were available to view or download.

Ten hour-long Alternative Views programs are also available as streaming videos on Douglas Kellner's multimedia page

Alternative Views episode profiling Austin's Reverend Jacob Fontaine on Texas Archive of the Moving Image

Videos from Alternative Views can also be found on YouTube.
