= Jeremy Schaap =

American sportswriter and author (born 1969)

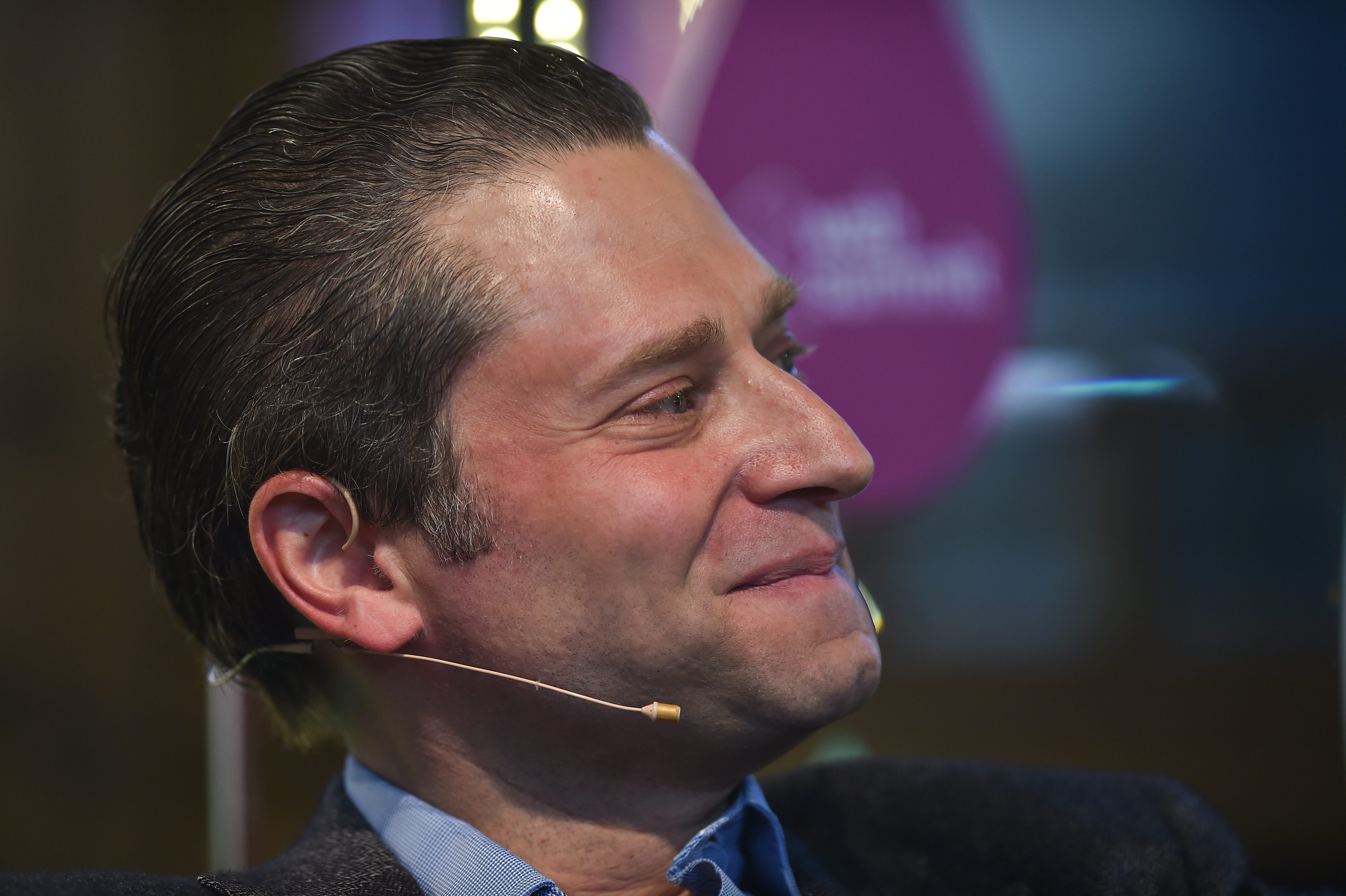
- Schaap at Web Summit in 2014
- Born: 1969 (age 56–57); New York City, U.S.
- Education: Cornell University
- Occupations: Author; sports journalist
- Notable credit: SportsCenter
- Children: 3
- Father: Dick Schaap
- Relatives: William Schaap (uncle); Phil Schaap (uncle)

Jeremy Schaap (born 1969) is an American sportswriter, television reporter and author. Schaap is an 11-time Emmy Awards winner for his work on ESPN's E:60, SportsCenter, and Outside the Lines.

== Biography ==
Schaap was born in New York City in 1969. He is a regular contributor to Nightline and ABC World News Tonight and has been published in Sports Illustrated, ESPN The Magazine, Time, Parade, The Wall Street Journal, and The New York Times.

Schaap has worked four major soccer events for ESPN as the network's lead reporter, including: the 2010 FIFA World Cup, Euro 2012, the 2014 FIFA World Cup, and Euro 2016.

A native and resident of New York City, Schaap is the author of Cinderella Man: James J. Braddock, Max Baer, and the Greatest Upset in Boxing History (Houghton Mifflin, ISBN 0-618-55117-4), a New York Times best-seller, and Triumph: The Untold Story of Jesse Owens and Hitler's Olympics.

Schaap is the son of the late journalist and broadcaster Dick Schaap. Like his father, Schaap is an alumnus of Cornell University and a former editor at The Cornell Daily Sun. Schaap was also a member of the Quill and Dagger society.

He won the Dick Schaap Award for Outstanding Writing at the 2005 Emmys, an award named after his father, for an Outside the Lines feature titled "Finding Bobby Fischer."

Schaap and his wife Joclyn live in Connecticut and are parents of three children.
