= Dick Schaap =

American sportswriter, broadcaster, and author (1934–2001)

- Born: Richard Jay Schaap; September 27, 1934; Brooklyn, New York City, U.S.
- Died: December 21, 2001 (aged 67); Manhattan, New York City, U.S.
- Education: Cornell University; Columbia University Graduate School of Journalism
- Occupations: Sportswriter, broadcaster, author
- Spouses: Madeline Gottlieb (div. 1981) Trish McLeod (m. 1981)
- Children: 6; including Jeremy
- Relatives: William Schaap (brother); Phil Schaap (cousin)
- Awards: Red Smith Award (2002); NSSA Hall of Fame (2015)

Richard Jay Schaap (September 27, 1934 – December 21, 2001) was an American sportswriter, broadcaster, and author.

== Early life and education ==
Born to a Jewish family in Brooklyn, and raised in Freeport, New York, on Long Island, Schaap began writing a sports column aged 14 for the weekly newspaper Freeport Leader, but the next year he obtained a job with the daily newspaper The Nassau Daily Review-Star working for Jimmy Breslin. He would later follow Breslin to the Long Island Press and New York Herald Tribune.

He attended Cornell University, where he served as editor-in-chief of The Cornell Daily Sun, the student newspaper. He obtained a letter in varsity lacrosse playing goaltender. During his last year at Cornell, Schaap was elected to the Sphinx Head Society. After graduating in 1955, he received a Grantland Rice fellowship at the Columbia University Graduate School of Journalism and authored his thesis on the recruitment of basketball players.

== Career ==
Schaap began work as assistant sports editor of Newsweek. In 1964, he began a thrice-weekly column concerning current events. He became editor of SPORT magazine in 1973. It was then that he set in motion the inspiration for the eccentricities of Media Day at the Super Bowl. Opposing the grandiose and self-important nature of the National Football League's championship match, he hired two Los Angeles Rams players, Fred Dryer and Lance Rentzel, to cover Super Bowl IX. Donning costumes inspired by The Front Page, "Scoops Brannigan" (Dryer) and "Cubby O'Switzer" (Rentzel) peppered players and coaches from both the Minnesota Vikings and Pittsburgh Steelers with questions that ranged from the clichéd to the downright absurd. Schaap was also a theatre critic, causing him to quip that he was the only person ever to vote for both the Tony Awards and the Heisman Trophy. He interviewed non-sports people such as Matthew Broderick and produced cultural features for ABC's overnight news program World News Now.

After spending the 1970s with NBC as an NBC Nightly News and Today Show correspondent, he moved to ABC World News Tonight and 20/20 at ABC in the 1980s. He earned five Emmy Awards, for profiles of Sid Caesar and Tom Waddell, two for reporting, and for writing. In 1988 he began hosting The Sports Reporters on ESPN cable television, which in later years often featured his son Jeremy as a correspondent. He also hosted Schaap One on One on ESPN Classic and a syndicated ESPN Radio program called The Sporting Life with Dick Schaap, in which he discussed the week's developments in sports with Jeremy. He also occasionally served as a substitute anchor for ABC's late night newscast, World News Now.

He wrote the 1968 best-seller Instant Replay, co-authored with Jerry Kramer of the Green Bay Packers, and I Can't Wait Until Tomorrow... 'Cause I Get Better-Looking Every Day, the 1969 autobiography of New York Jet Joe Namath. These resulted in a stint as co-host of The Joe Namath Show, which in turn led to his hiring as sports anchor for WNBC-TV. Other books included a biography of Robert F. Kennedy; .44 (with Jimmy Breslin), a fictionalized account of the hunt for Son of Sam killer David Berkowitz; Turned On, about upper middle-class drug abuse; An Illustrated History of the Olympics, a coffee-table book on the history of the modern Olympic Games; The Perfect Jump, on the world record-breaking long jump by Bob Beamon in the 1968 Summer Olympics; My Aces, My Faults with Nick Bollettieri; Steinbrenner!, a biography of mercurial New York Yankees owner George Steinbrenner; and Bo Knows Bo with Bo Jackson. His autobiography, Flashing Before My Eyes: 50 Years of Headlines, Deadlines & Punchlines, was reissued under Schaap's original title "Dick Schaap as Told to Dick Schaap: 50 years of Headlines, Deadlines and Punchlines."

== Death ==
Schaap died on December 21, 2001, at Lenox Hill Hospital in New York City of complications from hip replacement surgery that September. Schaap's final regular television appearance was on the September 16 broadcast of The Sports Reporters on the Sunday after the September 11 attacks on New York City and Washington, D.C. That weekend, all major American college and professional sporting events had been cancelled, and Schaap and his panelists discussed the diminished role of sports since the tragedy.

After Schaap's death, his estate and members of his family filed a lawsuit against three physicians and Lenox Hill Hospital, alleging that his death had been caused by medical malpractice. Specifically, they alleged that, for two years before his surgery, Schaap had been given a powerful medication called amiodarone to treat an irregular heartbeat. Amiodarone can cause lung damage (known as "amiodarone pulmonary toxicity") and, according to the plaintiffs, an X-ray of Schaap's chest that had been taken before the surgery indicated that he had lung damage. Three days after the surgery, Schaap began having difficulty breathing, and he was subsequently diagnosed with acute respiratory distress syndrome. He died three months after the operation, never having left the hospital. Among other claims, the plaintiffs contended that Schaap's surgery should have been postponed, that he should have been taken off the amiodarone, and that his lungs should have been given time to heal before the performance of the surgery.

The court dismissed the claim against the hospital on the ground that the physicians were not employees of the hospital. The plaintiffs' claims against the three physicians went to trial in 2005 in Manhattan. On July 1, 2005, after nine days of deliberations, a jury found that all three physicians had been negligent, but also found that the negligence of only one of the physicians had caused Schaap's death. That physician was a cardiologist who the plaintiffs had contended was negligent by not looking at the pre-operative chest X-ray. The jury awarded the plaintiffs a total of $1.95 million in damages.

== Personal life ==
Schaap was married twice. His first wife was Madeline Gottlieb; their divorce was finalized in March 1981. Schaap remarried to Trish McLeod shortly thereafter. He was the father of six children—Renee, Michelle, Jeremy, Joanna, Kari and David—and had five grandchildren. Schaap's younger brother was lawyer William Schaap. The jazz historian Phil Schaap was his cousin.

Around 1955, Schaap befriended Bobby Fischer, who was at the time a 12-year-old chess prodigy, and would later become a world chess champion. In 2005, prompted by questions posed by Schaap's son Jeremy, Fischer acknowledged that the relationship was significant and that the elder Schaap had been a "father figure" to him. Fischer was still resentful that Dick Schaap had later written, among many other comments, that Fischer "did not have a sane bone left in his body".

== Honors ==
The Sports Emmy division of the National Academy of Television Arts and Sciences renamed their writing category "The Dick Schaap Outstanding Writing Award." The 2005 Emmy Awards in this category was won by Jeremy for a SportsCenter piece called "Finding Bobby Fischer."

In 2002, Schaap was honored posthumously by the Associated Press Sports Editors (APSE) with the Red Smith Award. In the same year, he was also inducted into the Nassau County Sports Hall of Fame, which created a Dick Schaap Award for Outstanding Journalism.

On June 8, 2015, Schaap was inducted posthumously in the National Sportscasters and Sportswriters Association's Hall of Fame.
