= Douglas Kellner =

American philosopher (born 1943)

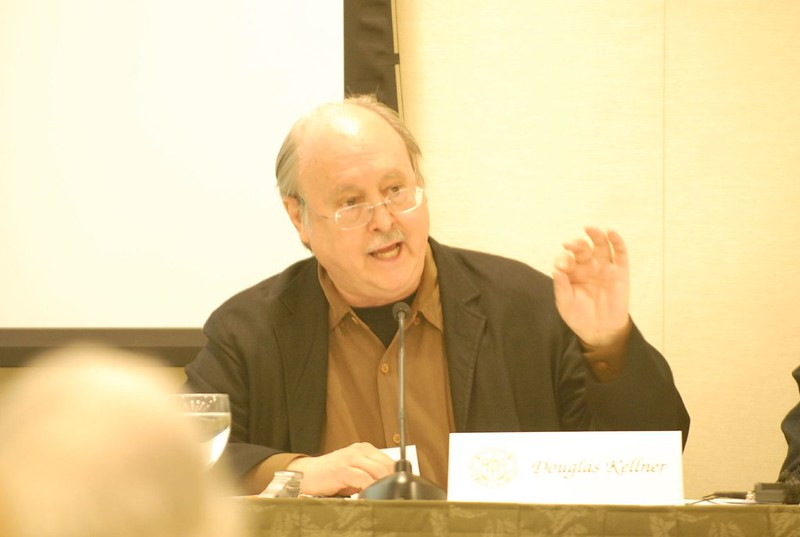
- Douglas Kellner speaking at an International Seminar at UCLA in 2009
- Born: 1943 (age 82–83)

Academic background
- Education: University of California, Los Angeles; Doane University; Columbia University (PhD)
- Thesis: Heidegger's Concept of Authenticity (1973)

Academic work
- Era: Contemporary philosophy
- Region: Western philosophy
- School or tradition: Frankfurt School
- Institutions: University of California, Los Angeles
- Main interests: Critical theory, postmodern theory, critical media literacy, media culture, alter-globalization
- Notable ideas: Multiple technoliteracies

Douglas Kellner (born May 31, 1943) is an American academic who works at the intersection of "third-generation" critical theory in the tradition of the Frankfurt University Institute for Social Research, or Frankfurt School, and in cultural studies in the tradition of the Birmingham Centre for Contemporary Cultural Studies, or the "Birmingham School". He has argued that these two conflicting philosophies are, in fact, compatible. He is currently the George Kneller Chair in the Philosophy of Education in the Graduate School of Education and Information Studies at the University of California, Los Angeles.

Kellner was an early theorist in the field of critical media literacy and has been a leading theorist of media culture generally. In his recent work, he has increasingly argued that media culture has become dominated by forms of spectacle and mega-spectacle. He also has contributed important studies of alter-globalization processes and has always been concerned with counter-hegemonic movements and alternative cultural expressions in the name of a more radically democratic society. He is known for his work exploring the politically oppositional potentials of new media and attempted to delineate the term "multiple technoliteracies" as a movement away from the present attempt to standardize a corporatist form of computer literacy. Kellner has published multiple works on the 2016 United States presidential election, focusing on Donald Trump's media spectacles and authoritarian populism.

Kellner has collaborated with a number of other authors, including K. Daniel Cho, Tyson E. Lewis, Clayton Pierce, and Rhonda Hammer. Kellner collaborated with Steven Best on an award-winning trilogy of books examining postmodern turns in philosophy, the arts, and science and technology. He served as the literary executor of the documentary filmmaker Emile de Antonio and acted as editor of "Collected Papers of Herbert Marcuse," which collected six volumes of the papers of the critical theorist Herbert Marcuse.

== Education and career ==
Kellner attended Doane College for his bachelor's degree, studying in Copenhagen for his junior year and graduating in 1965. Kellner then went on to Columbia University, earning a Ph.D. in philosophy in 1973. During his time at Columbia, Kellner partook in student protests against the Vietnam War. During this time he also came to believe in the political nature of knowledge as well as the relationship between history and the production of ideas. A historical understanding of philosophy's relationship to one's lived experiences became increasingly clear to Kellner through his research into German critical theory at the University of Tübingen in Germany. While studying there, he read the works of Theodor Adorno, Max Horkheimer, Karl Korsch, Herbert Marcuse, and Ernst Bloch, all of whom were instrumental in a new form of Marxist criticism concerned primarily with questions of culture and subjectivity rather than with analyzing production.

Kellner then went from Germany to France, where he attended lectures and read books of Michel Foucault, Gilles Deleuze, Jean Baudrillard, Jean-François Lyotard, and other postmodern theorists. Hence, Kellner's philosophical explorations did not end with the Frankfurt School. With his co-author Steven Best, Kellner has gone on to write a series of books critically interrogating what has come to be known as postmodern theory. Although adopting many insights from postmodernists such as Foucault, as well as many feminist and critical race theorists, Kellner retains the centrality of critical theory as a macro-theoretical lens capable of building conceptual bridges between various political movements and capable of critically evaluating and mediating competing philosophical perspectives.

Throughout his philosophical adventures, Kellner has drawn from the Frankfurt School a concern for the industrialization and commercialization of culture under capitalist relations of production. This situation has become most acute in the United States with its highly commercial media culture. Combining insights and methodological tools from the Frankfurt School and from British cultural studies, Kellner has written on media culture as a complex political, philosophical, and economic phenomenon. In his view, the media emerges as a "contested terrain" in which political struggles are played out in narrative and visual forms. Thus, films, television, the internet, etc. articulate dominant, conservative, reactionary social values but also offer progressive resistance against these values. As an example of Kellner's method of media analysis, he has read the image of the pop sensation Madonna as a complex representation of women that challenges gender, sexual, and fashion stereotypes while at the same time reasserting those very codes by offering a "new" notion of the self that is reliant upon hyper-consumerism. Kellner's work in the area of media culture has been influential for educators concerned with fostering "critical media literacy" capable of decoding the complexities of the visual culture that surrounds us.

Another equally important line of inquiry defining Kellner's work is his interest in "techno-capitalism" or capitalism defined by ever sophisticated advances in technology. Thus Kellner has been at the forefront of theorizing new technologies and their social, political, and economic impacts. His interest in technologies began in the mid-seventies while a professor at the University of Texas at Austin. Here Kellner studied the political economy of television producing the renowned and original works Television and the Crisis of Democracy and The Persian Gulf Television War as well as launching his own very successful alternative culture public-access television cable TV show entitled Alternative Views. As with his theories of media images, Kellner offers a dialectical approach to new technologies, highlighting their progressive and democratic potentials while also critiquing the undeniable reality of corporate interests that drive the technologies market. Again, this work has become increasingly important for educators concerned with the role of technology in the classroom. Indeed, Kellner has focused studies in education on explicating media literacy and the multiple literacies needed to critically engage culture in the contemporary era. On this basis, he has called for a democratic reconstruction of education for the new digitized, mediated, global, and multicultural era.

== Contributions to theory ==
=== Multiple technoliteracies ===
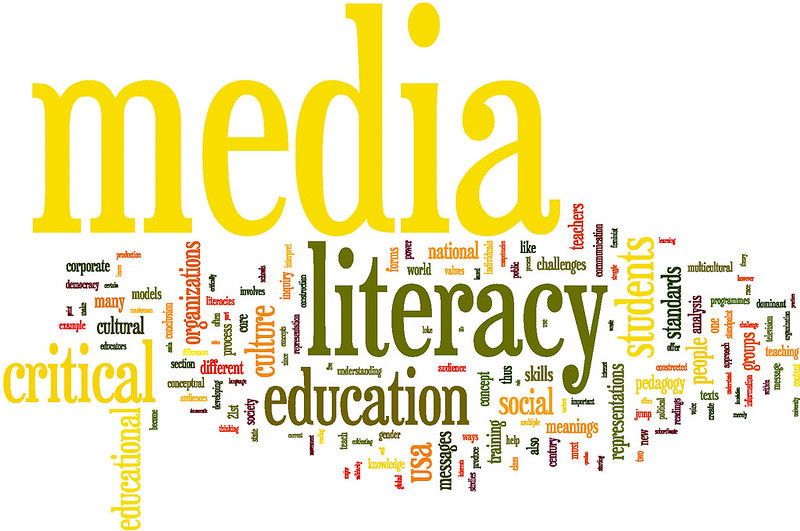
Critical themes in Kellner's work in sociology

In his work on media literacy, Kellner argued that learning competency in interpreting and criticizing various forms of media is essential to resisting the dominant social order. Kellner established literacy as the ability to effectively use “socially constructed forms of communication and representation.” He viewed media literacy as essential to maintaining an ethical society through the technological revolution and emphasized competence at navigating computers, multimedia, and media (films and television) in order to understand and stand apart from larger social forces. Multiple technoliteracies, in his view, is a counterhegemonic skill used in advancing the “interests of democratization and progressive transformation” with new technologies.

=== Techno-capitalism ===
Kellner proposed a theory of techno-capitalism as an alternative to post-capitalist social theories. Instead of categorizing the “information age” as a stage past capitalism, he defined it as a new configuration of capitalism on the basis that technology was ultimately influenced by the same imperatives and control. Kellner viewed techno-capitalism as a separate development due to the forces of scientific advancement, computers, automation, and advanced technology playing a role “in the process of production parallel to the role of human power.” The automation of labor increases at the expense of human manual labor, creating new importance placed on white-collar, managerial, and technical roles. The working class is fragmented from strong labor unions to independent, fragmented workers without much group influence, and power is concentrated in the hands of a few global conglomerates. Thus, under techno-capitalism, exploitation of the working class is increased. Essentially, Kellner adds to the value of Technocapitalism as it entails the future effects of automation and technology, as it has the power to eliminate humans from the labor force. The elimination of humans from the labor force with the replacement of advanced technologies would lead to greater social changes for humans, such as decreased work hours with lowered stress and an immense increase in leisure time. Current advances in technologies are showing how technocapitalism slowly is controlling our larger world at hand.

=== Critical postmodern theory ===
Kellner describes Critical Postmodern Theory as a counteraction toward the Enlightenment ideals of social reason and progress under the terms of labor and economy. Essentially, Kellner reveals how many enlightenment ideas stem from the beginning stages of capitalism, such as instrumental rationality and capitalist labor processes. Critical Postmodern theory expresses the capitalistic influence within many social structures, such as bureaucracy and the economy.

=== Supradisciplinary materialism ===
Supradispinary materialism defines the unification between social philosophy and science as it recognizes the differences between social research, presentation, and application. However, this specific type of science needs an academic approach to history, as it can reconstruct and recreate a new critical social perspective of materialist history. With proper application, materialism can describe the differences of specialized bourgeois science and academic philosophy

=== Authoritarian populism ===
Kellner's viewpoint on Authoritarian Populism reveals a hidden method to gain political and social unification of a divided nation in crisis, such as the United States. The cause of strong political and social leaders using an Authoritarian approach result from severe economic deprivation, political alienation, and global humiliation. As a result, social leaders provide extremely “magical” solutions for any social or political hardships, and this approach of leadership contains the capability to quickly unite a divided nation in need of dire leadership

=== Baudrillard's perspective on Marxism ===
Baudrillard's perspective on Marxism reveals his initial agreement with communism and its use of Marxism in order to properly combat the capitalistic systems in place within the government and economy. With Marxism, economic production can increase substantially to where a majority of social organizations in society can unite to oppose many capitalistic policies and values. He prioritizes Marxism within politics in order to justify a Marxist's definition of capital property and ideals for its benefit of producing objects

=== Radical Black discourse ===
Radical Black discourse, as Kellner reveals, shows the Black experience and oppression within the United States of America. Through various art forms, such as rap music and storytelling, Black African Americans used radios and stereo systems to show the “ghetto” life experiences and racism in the United States. This radical usage of music to convey the Black oppression and experience in the United States began the start of black liberties and civil rights movements

== Controversies ==
In January 2006, Kellner was caught up in the Bruin Alumni Association's controversial "Dirty Thirty" project, which listed UCLA's most politically extreme professors. The list was compiled by a former UCLA graduate student, Andrew Jones, who had previously been fired by his mentor David Horowitz for pressuring "students to file false reports about leftists" and for stealing Horowitz's mailing list of potential contributors to fund research for attacks on left-wing professors.

The Association offered students up to $100 for tapes of lectures that show how "radicals" on the faculty are "actively proselytizing their extreme views in the classroom". Kellner was named number three; Peter McLaren, also in the School of Education and Information Studies at UCLA, topped the list at number one.

Kellner responded in print with the view that the "attack exemplified right wing interventions within the cultural wars that have raged on campuses since the 1960s".

== Political writing ==
Kellner's writing style has been the subject of criticism in the scholarly field, as many of his books are fiercely political. A Publishers Weekly review of Grand Theft 2000: Media Spectacle and a Stolen Election was positive, though it concluded that the book's result is "somewhat formless and unfocused." Although the review praised some aspects, notably Kellner's highlighting of some conservative ideological inconsistencies, it lamented that Kellner's "sporadic, underdeveloped discussion of Republicans projecting their own sins onto Democrats is particularly frustrating."

Kellner received the 2008 American Educational Studies Association (AESA) Critics’ Choice Award for his book Guys and Guns Amok: Domestic Terrorism and School Shootings from the Oklahoma City Bombing to the Virginia Tech Massacre. The book argues that school shootings and other acts of mass violence embody a crisis of out-of-control gun culture and male rage, heightened by a glorification of hyper-masculinity and violence in the media.

Kellner has written multiple works on the 2016 Presidential Election, strongly opposing Donald Trump. In his 2016 book American Nightmare Donald Trump, Media Spectacle, and Authoritarian Populism, Kellner applies his focus on media culture and literacy to the election of Donald Trump. Kellner built on this work in 2017, publishing American Horror Show: Election 2016 and the Ascent of Donald J. Trump, in which he criticizes the president, referring to him as "the Swamp King" and "Putin's Poodle."

Kellner's idea of American neo-fascism describes the manipulative form of deception that many politicians would force upon their supporters for political and social unification. By using many forms of prejudices and biases, politicians, such as Trump and Richard Nixon, can deploy these types of habits in order to create unity and solidarity in a politically divided world. By exploiting international events to manipulate, these politicians can motivate and activate their political party in order to elevate themselves above racial and social minorities. This exploitation of power reveals the larger theme of hidden power and manipulation in American neo-fascism.

== Criticism ==
=== Media Culture ===
Many academics disagree with Kellner's perspective on the postmodern phenomenon, which entails the new sense of cultural identity streaming from postmodern nationalism, religion, and family. However, many academic sociologists appreciate Kellner's type of cultural media analysis, where he demands that media culture analysis requires the use of social theory. Through the proper usage and application of social theory, Socialists can better understand the “postmodern phenomena” proposed by Douglas Kellner

=== Guys and Guns Amok ===
Sociologists discuss and debate the effectiveness of Kellner's proposal to culturally profile the mass terrorists under the guise of a “gun-heavy society”. His approach to the distinct social and cultural influences from the multiple shooters distinguishes Kellner's breakdown from the typical psychological approach. However, sociologists appreciate and applaud Kellner's attempt to connect the various connections between culture, society, and psychology in order to provide a full understanding of a sociological inquiry

=== From 9/11 to Terror War ===
Sociologists often describe Kellner's perspective on the causes and motivations of terrorism from 9/11 as originating from capitalist globalization from the U.S. influence. Kellner shows the potential solutions toward the post 9/11 war on terror, and these solutions often include the power of unified dialogue, cooperation, and commitment to global effort. Sociologists applaud Kellner for his initial attempts to decipher the actual means to propose a global solution toward terror, and his approach reveals a possibility for a peaceful resolution for post 9/11 terrorism.

== Awards ==
Kellner was named a fellow of the Sudikoff Family Institute for New Education and Media from 2003 to 2004.

== Selected works ==
Books authored

- Herbert Marcuse and the Crisis of Marxism. London: Macmillan, 1984. ISBN 0-333-36830-4.
- Camera Politica: The Politics and Ideology of Contemporary Hollywood Film. Co-authored with Michael Ryan. Indiana University Press, June 1988. ISBN 978-0253206046.
- Jean Baudrillard: From Marxism to Postmodernism and Beyond. Oxford: Polity Press, 1989. ISBN 0-7456-0562-1.
- Critical Theory, Marxism, and Modernity. Parallax Re-visions of Culture and Society. Stephen G. Nichols, Gerald Prince, and Wendy Steiner, series editors. Baltimore: Johns Hopkins University Press, September 1989. ISBN 978-0801839146 (Paperback); Polity Press. ISBN 978-0745604398 (Hardcover).
- Television And The Crisis Of Democracy (Interventions: Theory and Contemporary Politics). Westview Press, 1990. ISBN 978-0813305493
- Postmodern Theory: Critical Interrogations. with Steven Best, Guilford Press, November 1991. ISBN 978-0898624120.
- The Persian Gulf TV War. Boulder, Colorado: Westview Press, September 1992. ISBN 978-0813316147.
- Media Culture: Cultural Studies, Identity and Politics Between the Modern and the Postmodern. London: Routledge, January 1995. ISBN 978-0415105699.
- The Postmodern Turn. with Steven Best. Guilford Press, August 1997. ISBN 978-1-57230-221-1.
- The Postmodern Adventure: Science, Technology, and Cultural Studies at the Third Millennium. with Steven Best. Guilford Press, June 2001. ISBN 978-1572306660.
- Grand Theft 2000. Media Spectacle and a Stolen Election. Rowman & Littlefield, August 2001. ISBN 978-0742421028.
- From 9/11 to Terror War: The Dangers of the Bush Legacy. Rowman & Littlefield, 2003. ISBN 0-7425-2638-0.
- Guys and Guns Amok: Domestic Terrorism and school Shootings from the Oklahoma City Bombing to the Virginia Tech Massacre. Boulder, Colorado: Paradigm Publishers, January 2008. ISBN 978-1594514937.
- Cinema Wars: Hollywood Film and Politics in the Bush-Cheney Era. Oxford, England: Wiley-Blackwell, 2009. ISBN 9781405198233
- Media/Cultural Studies: Critical Approaches. with Rhonda Hammer. New York, NY: Peter Lang Publishing, 2009. ISBN 9781433107016
- American Nightmare Donald Trump, Media Spectacle, and Authoritarian Populism. Rotterdam: Sense Publishers, 2016. ISBN 9789463007887
- American Horror Show: Election 2016 and the Ascent of Donald J. Trump. Rotterdam: Sense Publishers, 2017. ISBN 9789463007887

Books edited

- Baudrillard: A Critical Reader. Oxford; Cambridge, MA: Blackwell, 1994. ISBN 9781557864659.
- Critical Theory and Society: A Reader. Edited with Stephen Eric Bronner. New York, NY: Routledge, 1989. ISBN 0415900409.
- Right-Wing Populism in America: Too Close for Comfort. Edited with Chip Berlet and Matthew N. Lyons. New York: Guilford Press, 2000. ISBN 1462537618. ISBN 978-1572305687. OCLC 1028951306. 498 p.
- Philosophy, Psychoanalysis and Emancipation, Volume 5 of the Collected Papers of Herbert Marcuse. Edited with Clayton Pierce. New York, NY: Routledge, 2010. ISBN 978-0415137843.

Book contributions

- "Frankfurt School, Media, and the Culture Industry." In: Valdivia, A.N. (ed). The International Encyclopedia of Media Studies. Archived from the original. doi:10.1002/9781444361506.wbiems029.

Essays and articles

- "Critical Theory and the Culture Industries: A Reassessment." Telos, Vol. 1984, No. 62, Winter 1984, pp. 196–206. New York: Telos Press. doi:10.3817/1284062196.
- "Multiple Literacies and Critical Pedagogy in a Multicultural Society." Educational Theory, Vol. 48, No. 1, 1998. pp. 103–22.
- "Dawns, Twilights, and Transitions: Postmodern Theories, Politics, and Challenges." Co-authored by Steven Best. Democracy & Nature: The International Journal of Inclusive Democracy, Vol. 7, No. 1, March 2001.
- "Grand Theft 2000: Media Spectacle and a Stolen Election: Review." Publishers Weekly, 29 October 2001.
- "Technological Transformation, Multiple Literacies, and the Re-visioning of Education." E-Learning, Vol. 1, No. 1, 2004. pp. 9–37.
- "Election 2004: The War for the White House and Media Spectacle." Logos, Vol. 3, No. 4, Fall 2004. Full issue available (PDF). Archived from the original.
- "Oppositional Politics and the Internet: A Critical/Reconstructive Approach." Co-authored by Richard Kahn. Cultural Politics, Vol 1. No. 1, 2005.
- "Reconstructing Technoliteracy: A Multiple Literacies Approach." Co-authored by Richard Kahn. Defining Technological Literacy: Towards an Epistemological Framework, edited by John Dakers. Palgrave, 2006.
- "Resisting Globalization." The Blackwell Companion to Globalization. Edited by George Ritzer. Co-authored with Richard Kahn. Blackwell, 2007.
- "Cultural Marxism and Cultural Studies", UCLA, 2004.
