= William Schaap =

American lawyer

- Born: William Herman Schaap; March 1, 1940; New York City, U.S.
- Died: February 25, 2016 (aged 75)
- Education: Cornell University; University of Chicago Law School
- Relatives: Dick Schaap (brother); Phil Schaap (cousin); Jeremy Schaap (nephew)

William Herman Schaap (March 1, 1940 – February 25, 2016) was an American lawyer, co-founder of the CovertAction Information Bulletin, and director of the Institute for Media Analysis.

== Life ==
He was born in Brooklyn to Maurice and Leah (née Lerner) Schaap. Dick Schaap was his older brother. He graduated from Cornell University, and from University of Chicago Law School in 1964. Most of Schaap's legal career was spent representing activists, protesters, and whistleblowers. He also advised conscientious objectors to the Vietnam War while working in Germany and Japan.

In 1976, he helped found CovertAction Information Bulletin, which was renamed the CovertAction Quarterly in 1992. Schaap was married to co-founder Ellen Ray.

== Works ==
=== Books ===
- Dirty Work 2: The CIA in Africa, with Ellen Ray, Karl Van Meter, and Louis Wolf. Lyle Stuart (1979). ISBN 978-0818402944.
- Covert Action: The Roots of Terrorism, with Ellen Ray. New York: Ocean Press (2003). ISBN 978-1876175849.
- Bioterror: Manufacturing Wars the American Way, with Ellen Ray. New York: Ocean Press / Institute for Media Analysis, Inc. ISBN 978-1876175641.

=== Articles ===
- "Half a Billion Allocated: The CIA Chooses a New Contra Leader." CovertAction Information Bulletin, no. 26 (Summer 1986). pp. 25–26. Full issue.
- "The Modern Mithridates: Vernon Walters: Crypto-Diplomat and Terrorist." CovertAction Information Bulletin, no. 26 (Summer 1986), pp. 3–8. Full issue.
- "Filipino Refugee Secretly Tapes CIA Recruiting Pitch," with Ellen Ray. CovertAction Information Bulletin, no. 39 (Winter 1991), pp. 58–62. Full issue.

=== Media ===
- CIA Covert Operations with William Schaap (2016). Interview by Our Hidden History.
- MLK Assassination Trial: William Schaap Testimony on Govt. Disinformation (Nov. 30, 1999). Full transcript at The King Center.
