= Intelligence Identities Protection Act =

United States federal law

- Other short titles: Intelligence Identities Protection Act of 1981
- Long title: An Act to amend the National Security Act of 1947 to prohibit the unauthorized disclosure of information identifying certain United States intelligence officers, agents, informants, and sources.
- Acronyms (colloquial): IIPA
- Nicknames: Intelligence Identities Protection Act of 1982
- Enacted by: the 97th United States Congress
- Effective: June 23, 1982

Citations
- Public law: 97-200
- Statutes at Large: 96 Stat. 122

Codification
- Titles amended: 50 U.S.C.: War and National Defense
- U.S.C. sections amended: 50 U.S.C. ch. 15 § 401 et seq.; 50 U.S.C. ch. 15, subch. IV §§ 421-426

Legislative history
- Introduced in the House as H.R. 4 by Edward Boland (D–MA) on January 5, 1981; Committee consideration by House Intelligence (Permanent); Passed the House on September 23, 1981 (355-57); Passed the Senate on March 18, 1982 (90-6, in lieu of S. 391); Reported by the joint conference committee on May 20, 1982; agreed to by the House on June 3, 1982 (319-36) and by the Senate on June 10, 1982 (81-5); Signed into law by President Ronald Reagan on June 23, 1982

The Intelligence Identities Protection Act of 1982 (Pub. L. 97–200, 50 U.S.C. §§ 421–426) is a United States federal law that makes it a federal crime for those with access to classified information, or those who systematically seek to identify and expose covert agents and have reason to believe that it will harm the foreign intelligence activities of the U.S., to intentionally reveal the identity of an agent whom one knows to be in or recently in certain covert roles with a U.S. intelligence agency, unless the United States has publicly acknowledged or revealed the relationship.

== History ==
The law was written, in part, as a response to several incidents where Central Intelligence Agency (CIA) agents or officers' identities were revealed. Under then existing law, such disclosures were legal when they did not involve the release of classified information. In 1975, CIA Athens station chief Richard Welch was assassinated by the Greek urban guerrilla group November 17 after his identity was revealed in several listings by a magazine called CounterSpy, edited by Timothy Butz. A local paper checked with CounterSpy to confirm his identity. However, the linkage between the publication of Welch's name and his assassination has been challenged by pundits that claim he was residing in a known CIA residency.

Another major impetus to pass the legislation was the activities of ex-CIA case officer Philip Agee during the 1960s and 1970s. Agee's book CIA Diary and his publication of the Covert Action Information Bulletin blew the cover of many agents. Some commentators say the law was specifically targeted at his actions, and one Congressman, Bill Young, said during a House debate, "What we're after today are the Philip Agees of the world."

The law passed the House by a vote of 315–32, with all opposing votes coming from Democrats. The law passed the Senate 81–4, with the opponents being Democratic Senators Joe Biden, Gary Hart, and Daniel Patrick Moynihan, and Republican Senator Charles Mathias. Biden had written an op-ed column in the Christian Science Monitor published on April 6, 1982, that criticized the proposed law as harmful to national security.

As of January 2013, there have been only two successful prosecutions involving the statute. In 1985, Sharon Scranage, a secretary in the CIA's office in Accra, Ghana, was sentenced to five years and served eight months, for giving the names of other agents to her boyfriend in Ghana. Beginning in February 2013, John C. Kiriakou, a former CIA officer, who accepted a plea bargain, served 23 months in prison and three months house arrest for disclosing the name of another CIA officer to a reporter.

== First Amendment implications ==
The criminal provisions of the act are contained in 50 U.S.C. § 421. During Congress's consideration of the measure, much attention is paid to subsection 421(c), which states:

421(c) Disclosure of information by persons in course of pattern of activities intended to identify and expose covert agents. Whoever, in the course of a pattern of activities intended to identify and expose covert agents and with reason to believe that such activities would impair or impede the foreign intelligence activities of the United States, discloses any information that identifies an individual as a covert agent to any individual not authorized to receive classified information, knowing that the information disclosed so identifies such individual and that the United States is taking affirmative measures to conceal such individual's classified intelligence relationship to the United States, shall be fined under Title 18 or imprisoned not more than three years, or both.

Under this subsection, journalists and political commentators alike could be prosecuted should they show an effort towards discovering or revealing identities of covert agents. However, it was ultimately concluded by the Senate Judiciary and the Conference Committee that the measure is constitutionally sound. Individuals would only be prosecuted if they engage in a pattern of activities intended to identify and expose covert agents, on the grounds that such actions goes beyond information that might contribute to informed public debate on foreign policy or foreign intelligence activities.

The Conference Committee assured that U.S. intelligence critics would be beyond the reach of law so long as they do not actively seek to identify or expose covert agents. However, commentators are still wary of the measure, finding 421(c) standard over-broad since it lacks a 'specific intent requirement' and instead relies on a 'reason to believe' standard.

== Valerie Plame affair ==
Between 2003 and 2007, an investigation was conducted by prosecutor Patrick Fitzgerald into whether this law and others were violated in the identification of Valerie Plame as a CIA operative in a 2003 newspaper column by Robert Novak. As a result of the investigation, former Vice Presidential Chief-of-Staff "Scooter" Libby was convicted on two counts of perjury, one count of obstruction of justice and one count of making false statements to federal investigators and sentenced to thirty months in jail. In a court filing related to Libby's sentencing, the CIA stated that Plame was a covert agent at the time of the leak. In addition, the leak enabled the identification of Plame as an employee of the CIA front company, Brewster Jennings & Associates, and in doing so enabled the identification of other CIA agents who were "employed" there.

== Who is Rich Blee? ==
In 2011 Ray Nowosielski and John Duffy of SecrecyKills.org planned to release an audio documentary entitled Who is Rich Blee?, focusing on the CIA's Bin Ladin unit before 9/11, and the way certain CIA officials blocked information on 9/11 hijackers from reaching the FBI before 9/11. In the documentary they planned to reveal the identity of two CIA agents. One of them is "Frances", the red-headed CIA agent mentioned in several reports on the War on Terror, including Jane Mayer's The Dark Side and an AP news story from 2011 about the Khalid El-Masri case. However, after receiving threats under the IIPA, Duffy and Nowosielski decided to release the documentary with the names redacted. The CIA threatened them with prosecution. They claim that their webmaster later posted an email containing the identities by accident. The identities then spread to the wider Internet.

== John Kiriakou ==
A former CIA officer, John Kiriakou, was charged with offenses under the act. On Tuesday, October 23, 2012, Kiriakou pleaded guilty to violating the Intelligence Identities Protection Act.

As part of a plea agreement, Kiriakou accepted a 30-month prison term, while the charges filed under the Espionage Act were dropped. He was sentenced on January 25, 2013. This was the first conviction of a CIA officer under the Intelligence Identities Protection Act in 27 years.

== See also ==
- Espionage Act of 1917
- Executive Order 12958
- Executive Order 13292
