= United States antitrust law =

American legal system intended to promote competition among businesses

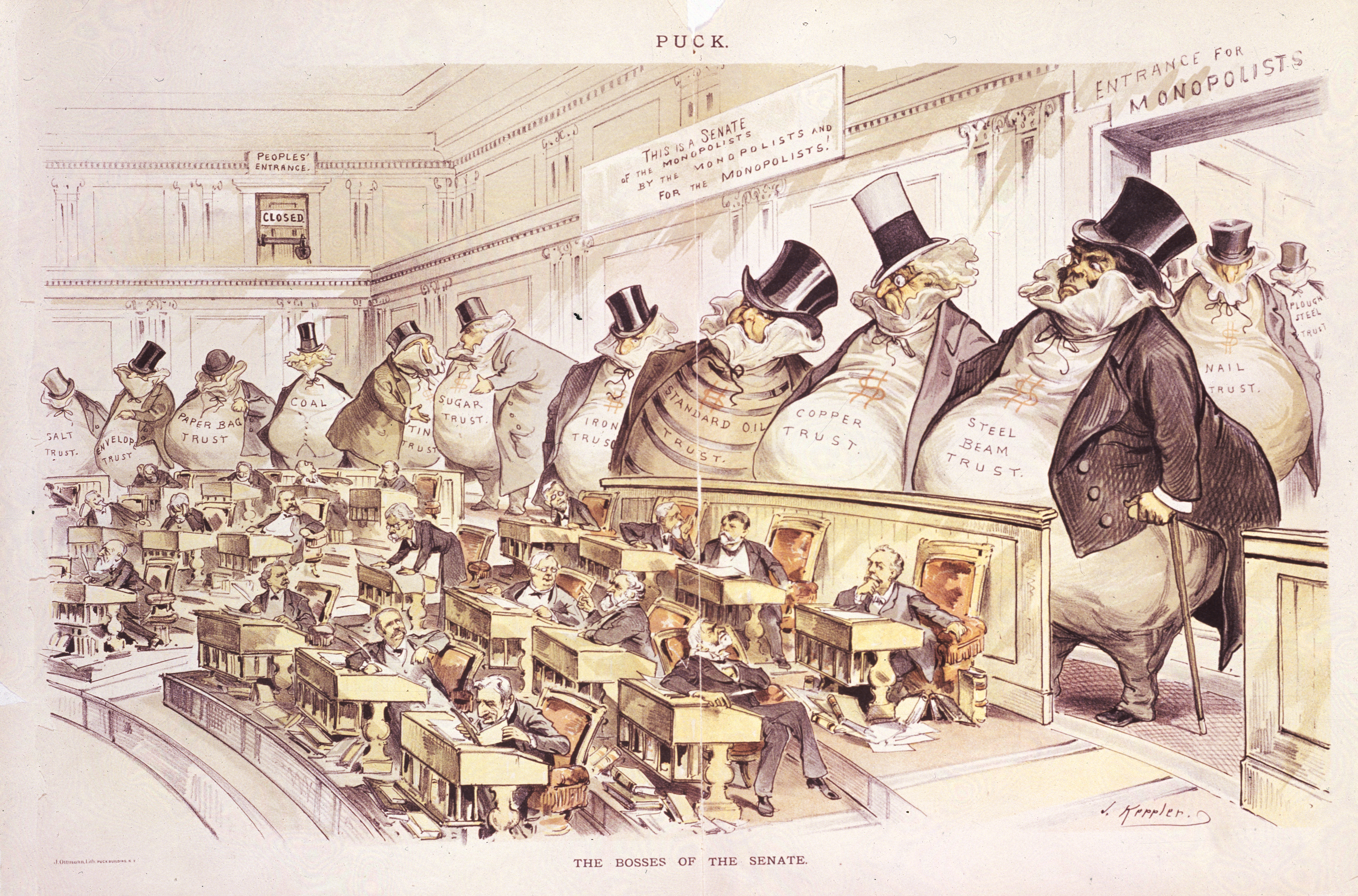
"The Bosses of the Senate", an 1889 political cartoon by Joseph Keppler depicting corporate interests—from steel, copper, oil, iron, sugar, tin, and coal to paper bags, envelopes, and salt—as giant money bags looming over the tiny senators at their desks in the Chamber of the United States Senate

In the United States, antitrust law is a collection of mostly federal laws that govern the conduct and organization of businesses in order to promote economic competition and prevent unjustified monopolies. The three main U.S. antitrust statutes are the Sherman Act of 1890, the Clayton Act of 1914, and the Federal Trade Commission Act of 1914. Section 1 of the Sherman Act prohibits price fixing and the operation of cartels, and prohibits other collusive practices that unreasonably restrain trade. Section 2 of the Sherman Act prohibits monopolization. Section 7 of the Clayton Act restricts the mergers and acquisitions of organizations that may substantially lessen competition or tend to create a monopoly.

Federal antitrust laws provide for both civil and criminal enforcement. Civil antitrust enforcement occurs through lawsuits filed by the Federal Trade Commission (FTC), the Antitrust Division of the U.S. Department of Justice, and private parties who have been harmed by an antitrust violation. Criminal antitrust enforcement is done only by the Justice Department's Antitrust Division. Additionally, U.S. state governments may also enforce their own antitrust laws, which mostly mirror federal antitrust laws, regarding commerce occurring solely within their own state's borders.

The scope of antitrust laws, and the degree to which they should interfere in an enterprise's freedom to conduct business, or to protect smaller businesses, communities and consumers, are strongly debated. Some economists argue that antitrust laws actually impede competition, and may discourage businesses from pursuing activities that would be beneficial to society. One view suggests that antitrust laws should focus solely on the benefits to consumers and overall efficiency, while a broad range of legal and economic theory sees the role of antitrust laws as also controlling economic power in the public interest.

Surveys of American Economic Association (AEA) members since the 1970s have shown that professional economists generally agree with the statement: "Antitrust laws should be enforced vigorously." A 1990 survey of AEA members found that 72 percent generally agreed that "Collusive behavior is likely among large firms in the United States", while a 2021 survey found that 85 percent generally agreed that "Corporate economic power has become too concentrated."

== Nomenclature ==
In the United States and Canada, and to a lesser extent in the European Union, the law governing monopolies and economic competition is known by its original name: "antitrust law". The term "antitrust" came from late 19th-century American industrialists' practice of using trusts—a legal arrangement where someone is given ownership of property to hold solely for another's benefit—to consolidate separate companies under common ownership. These "corporate trusts" died out in the early 20th century as U.S. states passed laws allowing corporations to own stock in other corporations. In most other countries, antitrust law is now called "competition law" or "anti-monopoly law".

== History ==
=== Creation and early years (1890–1910s) ===
American antitrust law formally began in 1890 when the U.S. Congress passed the Sherman Act, although a few states had already passed local antitrust laws during the previous year. Using broad and general wording, the Sherman Act outlawed "monopoliz[ation]" and "every contract, combination ... or conspiracy in restraint of trade".

Every contract, combination in the form of trust or otherwise, or conspiracy, in restraint of trade or commerce among the several States, or with foreign nations, is declared to be illegal. Every person who shall make any contract or engage in any combination or conspiracy hereby declared to be illegal shall be deemed guilty of a felony ....

— Sherman Act, Section 1 (as amended) (15 U.S.C. § 1).

Every person who shall monopolize, or attempt to monopolize, or combine or conspire with any other person or persons, to monopolize any part of the trade or commerce among the several States, or with foreign nations, shall be deemed guilty of a felony ....

— Sherman Act, Section 2 (as amended) (15 U.S.C. § 2).

Federal judges quickly began to struggle with the broad wording of the Sherman Act, recognizing that interpreting it literally could make even simple business associations such as partnerships illegal. They began developing principles for distinguishing between "naked" trade restraints between rivals that suppressed competition and other restraints that promoted competition.

The Sherman Act gave the U.S. Department of Justice the authority to enforce it, but the U.S. presidents and U.S. Attorneys General in power during the 1890s and early 1900s showed little interest in doing so. With little interest in enforcing the Sherman Act and courts interpreting it narrowly, a wave of large industrial mergers swept the United States in the late 1890s and early 1900s. The rise of the Progressive Era prompted public officials to increase enforcement of antitrust laws. The Justice Department sued 45 companies under the Sherman Act during the presidency of Theodore Roosevelt (1901–09) and 90 companies during the presidency of William Howard Taft (1909–13).

=== Rise of "Rule of Reason" (1910s–1930s) ===
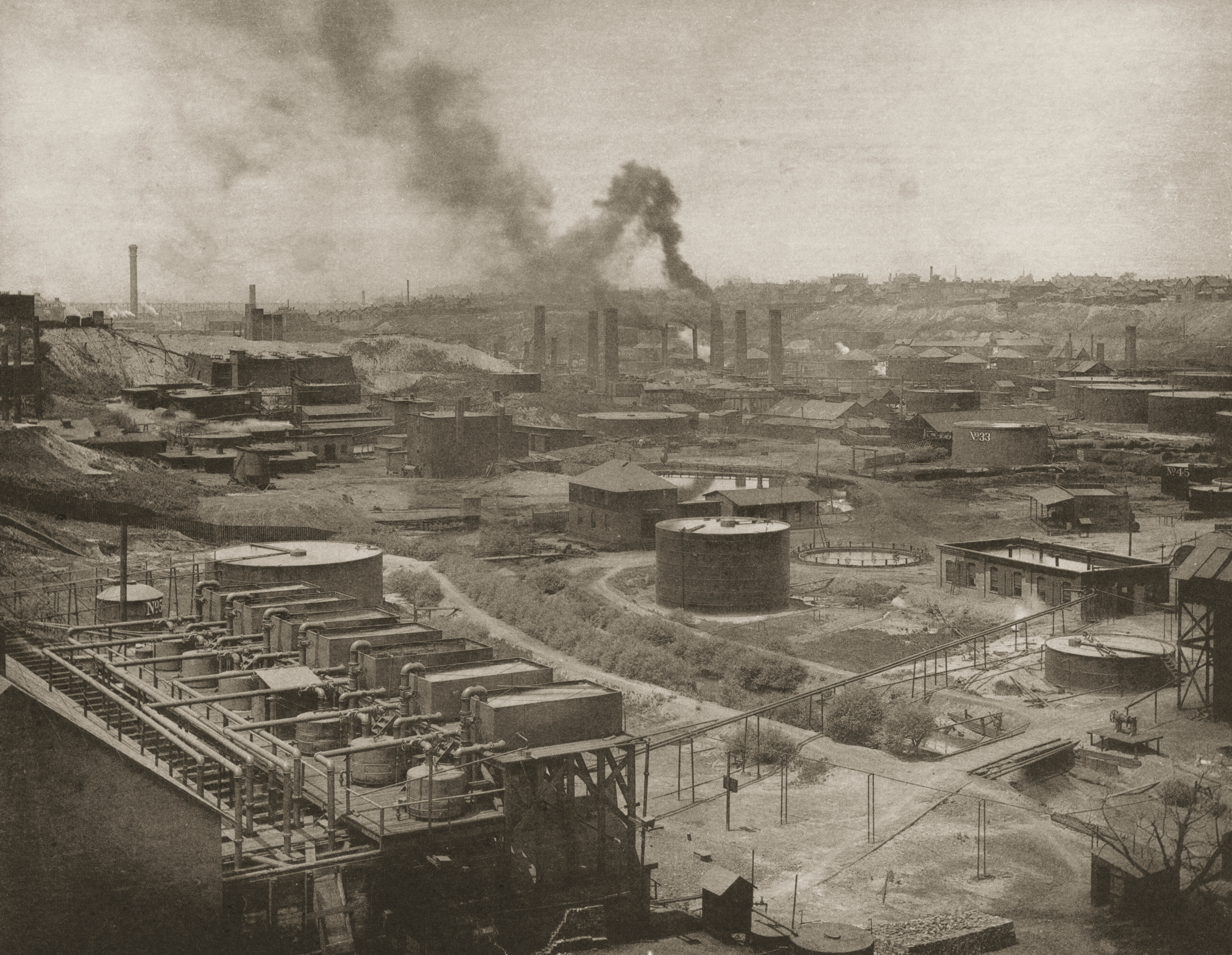
Standard Oil (Refinery No. 1 in Cleveland, Ohio, pictured) was a major company broken up under United States antitrust laws.

In 1911, the U.S. Supreme Court reframed U.S. antitrust law as a "rule of reason" in its landmark decision Standard Oil Co. of New Jersey v. United States. The Justice Department had successfully argued that the petroleum conglomerate Standard Oil, led by its founder John D. Rockefeller, had violated the Sherman Act by building a monopoly in the oil refining industry through economic threats against competitors and secret rebate deals with railroads. Standard Oil appealed, but the Supreme Court affirmed the trial court's verdict. The Court ruled that Standard Oil's high market share was proof of its monopoly power and ordered it to break itself up into 34 separate companies. At the same time, the Court said that although the Sherman Act prohibited "every" restraint of trade, it actually banned only those that were "unreasonable". In a more than 80-page-long opinion written by Chief Justice Edward Douglass White, the Court explained that the Sherman Act should be interpreted as a "rule of reason" under which the legality of most business practices is evaluated on a case-by-case basis according to their effect on competition, with only the most egregious practices being illegal per se.

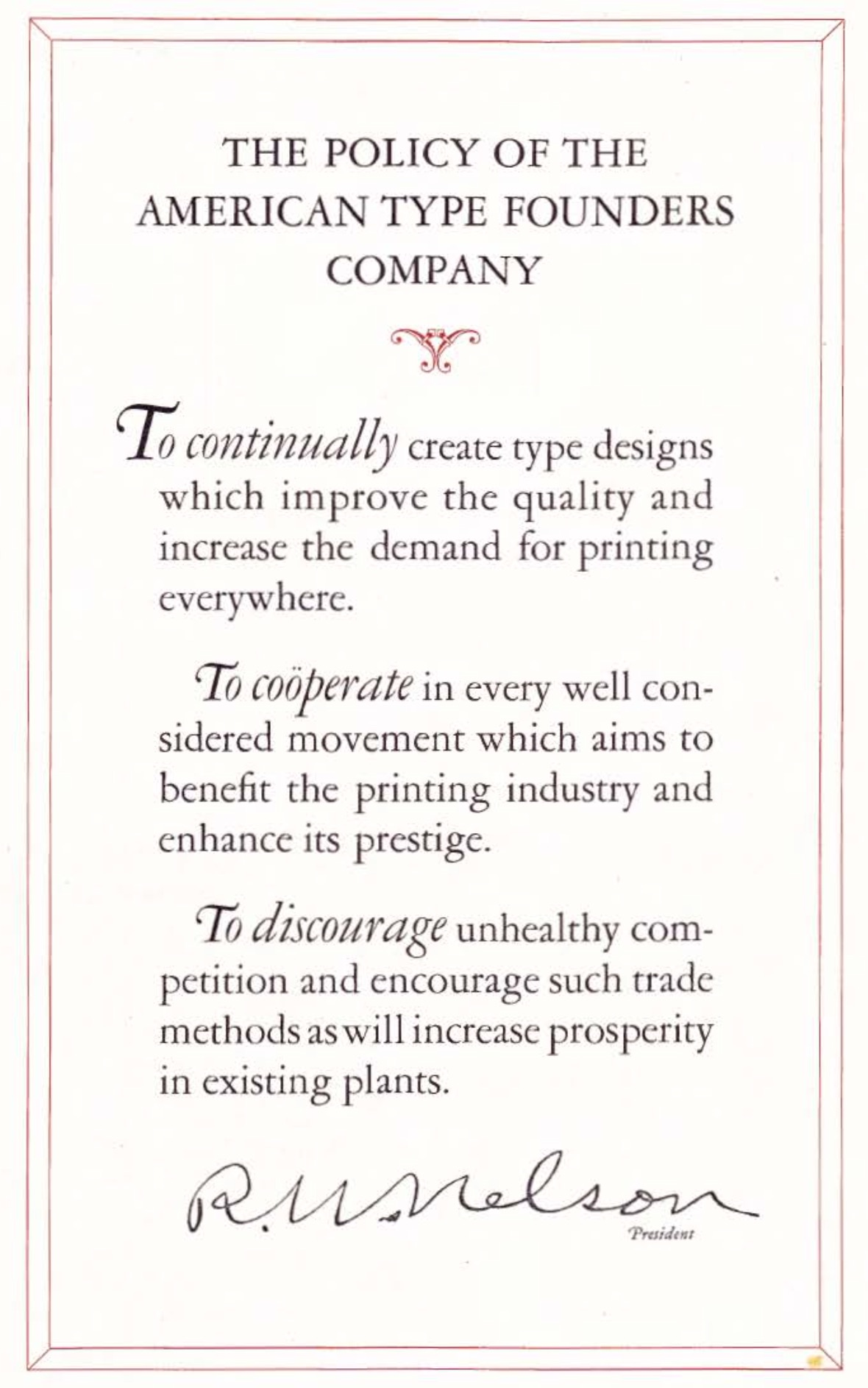
The printing equipment company ATF explicitly states in its 1923 manual that its goal is to 'discourage unhealthy competition' in the printing industry.

Many observers thought the Supreme Court's decision in Standard Oil represented an effort by conservative federal judges to "soften" the Sherman Act and narrow its scope. Congress reacted in 1914 by passing two new laws: the Clayton Act, which outlawed using mergers and acquisitions to achieve monopolies and created an antitrust law exemption for collective bargaining; and the Federal Trade Commission Act, which created the FTC as an independent agency with shared jurisdiction with the Justice Department over federal civil antitrust enforcement and the power to prohibit "unfair methods of competition".

Despite the passage of the Clayton Act and the FTC Act, U.S. antitrust enforcement was not aggressive between 1914 and the 1930s. Based on their experience with the War Industries Board during World War I, many American leaders took the associationalist view that close collaboration among business leaders and government officials could efficiently guide the economy. Some abandoned faith in free market competition entirely after the Wall Street Crash of 1929. Advocates of these views championed the passage of the National Industrial Recovery Act of 1933 and the centralized economic planning experiments during the early stages of the New Deal. The Supreme Court's antitrust decisions during this period reflected these views and took a "largely tolerant" attitude toward collusion and cooperation between competitors. One prominent example was the 1918 decision Chicago Board of Trade v. United States, in which the Court ruled that a Chicago Board of Trade rule banning commodity brokers from buying or selling grain forwards after the close of business at 2:00 pm each day at any price other than that day's closing price did not violate the Sherman Act. The Court said that although the rule was a restraint on trade, a comprehensive examination of the rule's purposes and effects showed that it "merely regulates, and perhaps thereby promotes competition."

=== Structuralist approach (1930s–1970s) ===
In the mid-1930s, confidence began to fade in economic statism and the centralized economic planning models that had been popular in the early years of the New Deal era. President Franklin D. Roosevelt's advisors began persuading him that free-market competition was the key to recovery from the Great Depression, at the urging of economists such as Frank Knight and Henry C. Simons. Simons, in particular, argued for robust antitrust enforcement to “de-concentrate” American industries and promote competition. In response, Roosevelt appointed Thurman Arnold and other "trustbusting" lawyers to serve in the Justice Department's Antitrust Division, which had been established in 1919.

This intellectual shift influenced American courts to abandon their acceptance of sector-wide cooperation among companies. Instead, American antitrust jurisprudence began following strict "structuralist" rules that focused on the structures of markets and their levels of concentration. Judges usually gave little credence to defendant companies' attempts to justify their conduct using economic efficiencies, even when economic data and analysis supported them. In its 1940 decision United States v. Socony-Vacuum Oil Co., the Supreme Court refused to apply the rule of reason to an agreement between oil refiners to buy up surplus gasoline from independent refining companies. It ruled that price-fixing agreements between competing companies were illegal per se under section 1 of the Sherman Act and would be treated as crimes even if the companies claimed to be merely recreating past government planning schemes. The Court began applying per se illegality to other business practices such as tying, group boycotts, market allocation agreements, exclusive territory agreements for sales, and vertical restraints limiting retailers to geographic areas. Courts also became more willing to find that dominant companies' business practices constituted illegal monopolization under section 2 of the Sherman Act.

American courts were even stricter when hearing merger challenges under the Clayton Act during this era, due in part to Congress's passage of the Celler-Kefauver Act of 1950, which banned consolidation of companies' stock or assets even in situations that did not produce market dominance. For example, in its 1962 decision Brown Shoe Co. v. United States, the Supreme Court ruled that a proposed merger was illegal even though the resulting company would have controlled only five percent of the relevant market. In a now-famous line from his dissent in the Supreme Court's 1966 decision United States v. Von's Grocery Co., Justice Potter Stewart remarked: "The sole consistency that I can find [in U.S. merger law] is that in litigation under [the Clayton Act], the Government always wins."

=== Rise of the Chicago School (1970s–present) ===
The "structuralist" interpretation of U.S. antitrust law began losing favor in the early 1970s in the face of harsh criticism by economists and legal scholars from the University of Chicago. Scholars from the Chicago school of economics had long called for reducing price regulation and limiting barriers to entry. Newer Chicago economists such as Aaron Director argued that there were economic efficiency explanations for some practices that had been condemned under the structuralist interpretation of the Sherman and Clayton Acts. Much of their analysis involved game theory, which showed that some conduct that had been thought anticompetitive, such as preemptive capacity expansion, could be either pro- or anticompetitive depending upon the circumstances.

The writings of Yale Law School professor Robert Bork and University of Chicago Law School professors Richard Posner and Frank Easterbrook, who all later became prominent federal judges, translated Chicago economists' advances into legal principles that judges could apply. Pointing out that economic analysis showed that some previously condemned practices were actually procompetitive and had economic benefits that outweighed their dangers, they argued that many antitrust bright-line per se rules of illegality were unwarranted and should be replaced by the rule of reason. Judges increasingly accepted their ideas from the mid-1970s on, motivated in part by the United States' declining economic dominance amidst the 1973–1975 recession and rising competition from East Asian and European countries.

The "pivotal event" in this shift was the Supreme Court's 1977 decision Continental Television, Inc. v. GTE Sylvania, Inc. Prominently citing Chicago school of economics scholarship, the Court ruled that non-price vertical restrictions in contracts were no longer per se illegal and should be analyzed under the rule of reason. Overall, the Supreme Court's antitrust rulings during this era on collusion cases under section 1 of the Sherman Act reflected tension between the older "absolutist" approach and the newer Chicago endorsing the rule of reason and economic analysis.

The Justice Department and the FTC lost most of the monopolization cases they brought under section 2 of the Sherman Act during this era. One of the government's few anti-monopoly victories was United States v. AT&T, which in 1982 led to the breakup of Bell Telephone and its monopoly on U.S. telephone service. The general "trimming back" of antitrust law in the face of economic analysis also resulted in more permissive standards for mergers. In the Supreme Court's 1974 decision United States v. General Dynamics Corp., the federal government lost a merger challenge at the Supreme Court for the first time in more than 25 years.

In 1999, a coalition of 19 states and the federal Justice Department sued Microsoft. A highly publicized trial in the U.S. District Court for the District of Columbia found that Microsoft had strong-armed many companies in an attempt to prevent competition from the Netscape browser. In 2000, the trial court ordered Microsoft to split in two, preventing it from future misbehavior. Microsoft appealed to the U.S. Court of Appeals for the D.C. Circuit, which affirmed in part and reversed in part. In addition, it removed the judge from the case for discussing the case with the media while it was still pending. With the case in front of a new judge, Microsoft and the government settled, with the government dropping the case in return for Microsoft agreeing to cease many of the practices the government challenged.

== Cartels and collusion ==
Every contract, combination in the form of trust or otherwise, or conspiracy, in restraint of trade or commerce among the several States, or with foreign nations, is declared to be illegal. Every person who shall make any contract or engage in any combination or conspiracy hereby declared to be illegal shall be deemed guilty of a felony, and, on conviction thereof, shall be punished by fine not exceeding $100,000,000 if a corporation, or, if any other person, $1,000,000, or by imprisonment not exceeding 10 years, or by both said punishments, in the discretion of the court.

— Sherman Act 1890 §1

Preventing collusion and cartels that act in restraint of trade is an essential task of antitrust law. It reflects the view that each business has a duty to act independently on the market, and so earn its profits solely by providing better priced and quality products than its competitors.

The Sherman Act §1 prohibits "[e]very contract, combination in the form of trust or otherwise, or conspiracy, in restraint of trade or commerce." This targets two or more distinct enterprises acting together in a way that harms third parties. It does not capture the decisions of a single enterprise, or a single economic entity, even though the form of an entity may be two or more separate legal persons or companies. In Copperweld Corp. v. Independence Tube Corp. it was held an agreement between a parent company and a wholly owned subsidiary could not be subject to antitrust law, because the decision took place within a single economic entity. This reflects the view that if the enterprise (as an economic entity) has not acquired a monopoly position, or has significant market power, then no harm is done. The same rationale has been extended to joint ventures, where corporate shareholders make a decision through a new company they form. In Texaco Inc. v. Dagher the Supreme Court held unanimously that a price set by a joint venture between Texaco and Shell Oil did not count as making an unlawful agreement. Thus the law draws a "basic distinction between concerted and independent action". Multi-firm conduct tends to be seen as more likely than single-firm conduct to have an unambiguously negative effect and "is judged more sternly". Generally the law identifies four main categories of agreement. First, some agreements such as price fixing or sharing markets are automatically unlawful, or illegal per se. Second, because the law does not seek to prohibit every kind of agreement that hinders freedom of contract, it developed a "rule of reason" where a practice might restrict trade in a way that is seen as positive or beneficial for consumers or society. Third, significant problems of proof and identification of wrongdoing arise where businesses make no overt contact, or simply share information, but appear to act in concert. Tacit collusion, particularly in concentrated markets with a small number of competitors or oligopolists, have led to significant controversy over whether or not antitrust authorities should intervene. Fourth, vertical agreements between a business and a supplier or purchaser "up" or "downstream" raise concerns about the exercise of market power, however they are generally subject to a more relaxed standard under the "rule of reason".

=== Per se illegal practices ===
Some practices are deemed by the courts to be so obviously detrimental that they are categorized as being automatically unlawful, or illegal per se. The simplest and central case of this is price fixing. This involves an agreement by businesses to set the price or consideration of a good or service which they buy or sell from others at a specific level. If the agreement is durable, the general term for these businesses is a cartel. It is irrelevant whether or not the businesses succeed in increasing their profits, or whether together they reach the level of having market power as might a monopoly. Such collusion is illegal per se.

- United States v. Trenton Potteries Co., 273 U.S. 392 (1927) per se illegality of price fixing
- Appalachian Coals, Inc. v. United States, 288 U.S. 344 (1933)
- United States v. Socony-Vacuum Oil Co., 310 U.S. 150 (1940)

Bid rigging is a form of price fixing and market allocation that involves an agreement in which one party of a group of bidders will be designated to win the bid. Geographic market allocation is an agreement between competitors not to compete within each other's geographic territories.

- Addyston Pipe and Steel Co. v. United States pipe manufacturers had agreed among themselves to designate one lowest bidder for government contracts. This was held to be an unlawful restraint of trade contrary to the Sherman Act. However, following the reasoning of Justice Taft in the Court of Appeals, the Supreme Court held that implicit in the Sherman Act §1 there was a rule of reason, so that not every agreement which restrained the freedom of contract of the parties would count as an anti-competitive violation.
- Hartford Fire Insurance Co. v. California, 113 S.Ct. 2891 (1993) 5 to 4, a group of reinsurance companies acting in London were successfully sued by California for conspiring to make U.S. insurance companies abandon policies beneficial to consumers, but costly to reinsure. The Sherman Act was held to have extraterritorial application, to agreements outside U.S. territory.

Group boycotts of competitors, customers or distributors

- Fashion Originators' Guild of America v. FTC, 312 U.S. 457 (1941) the FOGA, a combination of clothes designers, agreed not to sell their clothes to shops which stocked replicas of their designs, and employed their own inspectors. Held to violate the Sherman Act §1
- Klor's, Inc. v. Broadway-Hale Stores, Inc., 359 U.S. 207 (1959) a group boycott is per se unlawful, even if it may be connected with a private dispute, and will have little effect upon the markets
- American Medical Association v. United States, 317 U.S. 519 (1943)
- Molinas v. National Basketball Association, 190 F. Supp. 241 (S.D.N.Y. 1961)
- Associated Press v. United States, 326 U.S. 1 (1945) 6 to 3, a prohibition on members selling "spontaneous news" violated the Sherman Act, as well as making membership difficult, and freedom of speech among newspapers was no defense, nor was the absence of a total monopoly
- Northwest Wholesale Stationers v. Pacific Stationery, 472 U.S. 284 (1985) it was not per se unlawful for the Northwest Wholesale Stationers, a purchasing co-operative where Pacific Stationery had been a member, to expel Pacific Stationery without any procedure or hearing or reason. Whether there were competitive effects would have to be adjudged under the rule of reason.
- NYNEX Corp. v. Discon, Inc., 525 U.S. 128 (1998) the per se group boycott prohibition does not apply to a buyer's decision to purchase goods from one seller or another

=== Rule of reason ===
If an antitrust claim does not fall within a per se illegal category, the plaintiff must show the conduct causes harm in "restraint of trade" under the Sherman Act §1 according to "the facts peculiar to the business to which the restraint is applied". This essentially means that unless a plaintiff can point to a clear precedent, to which the situation is analogous, proof of an anti-competitive effect is more difficult. The reason for this is that the courts have endeavoured to draw a line between practices that restrain trade in a "good" compared to a "bad" way. In the first case, United States v. Trans-Missouri Freight Association, the Supreme Court found that railroad companies had acted unlawfully by setting up an organisation to fix transport prices. The railroads had protested that their intention was to keep prices low, not high. The court found that this was not true, but stated that not every "restraint of trade" in a literal sense could be unlawful. Just as under the common law, the restraint of trade had to be "unreasonable". In Chicago Board of Trade v. United States the Supreme Court found a "good" restraint of trade. The Chicago Board of Trade had a rule that commodities traders were not allowed to privately agree to sell or buy after the market's closing time (and then finalise the deals when it opened the next day). The reason for the Board of Trade having this rule was to ensure that all traders had an equal chance to trade at a transparent market price. It plainly restricted trading, but the Chicago Board of Trade argued this was beneficial. Justice Brandeis, giving judgment for a unanimous Supreme Court, held the rule to be pro-competitive, and comply with the rule of reason. It did not violate the Sherman Act §1. As he put it,

Every agreement concerning trade, every regulation of trade, restrains. To bind, to restrain, is of their very essence. The true test of legality is whether the restraint imposed is such as merely regulates and perhaps thereby promotes competition or whether it is such as may suppress or even destroy competition. To determine that question, the court must ordinarily consider the facts peculiar to the business to which the restraint is applied, its condition before and after the restraint was imposed, the nature of the restraint, and its effect, actual or probable.

- Broadcast Music v. Columbia Broadcasting System, 441 U.S. 1 (1979) blanket licenses did not necessarily count as price fixing under a relaxed rule of reason test.
- Arizona v. Maricopa County Medical Society, 457 U.S. 332 (1982) 4 to 3 held that a maximum price agreement for doctors was per se unlawful under the Sherman Act section 1.
- Wilk v. American Medical Association, 895 F.2d 352 (7th Cir. 1990) the American Medical Association's boycott of chiropractors violated the Sherman Act §1 because there was insufficient proof that it was unscientific
- United States v. Topco Assocs., Inc., 405 U.S. 596 (1972)
- Palmer v. BRG of Georgia, Inc., 498 U.S. 46 (1990)
- National Soc'y of Prof. Engineers v. United States, 435 U.S. 679 (1978); ¶¶219-220 -
- NCAA v. Board of Regents of the University of Oklahoma, 468 U.S. 85 (1984) 7 to 2, held that the National College Athletics Association's restriction of television of games, to encourage live attendance, was restricting supply, and therefore unlawful.
- California Dental Assn. v. FTC, 526 U.S. 756 (1999)
- FTC v. Indiana Fed'n of Dentists, 476 U.S. 447 (1986)

=== Tacit collusion and oligopoly ===
- Matsushita Electric Industrial Co., Ltd. v. Zenith Radio Corp., 475 U.S. 574 (1986) held that the evidence needed to show unlawful collusion contrary to the Sherman Act must be enough to exclude the possibility of individual behavior.
- Bell Atlantic Corp. v. Twombly, 550 U.S. 544 (2007) 5 to 2, while Bell Atlantic and other major telephone companies were alleged to have acted in concert to share markets, and not compete in each other's territory to the detriment of small businesses, it was held that in absence of evidence of an agreement, parallel conduct is not enough to ground a case under the Sherman Act §1
- Interstate Circuit, Inc. v. United States, 306 U.S. 208 (1939)
- Theatre Enterprises v. Paramount Distributing, 346 U.S. 537 (1954), no evidence of illegal agreement, however film distributors gave first film releases to downtown Baltimore theatres, and suburban theatres were forced to wait longer. Held, there needed to be evidence of conspiracy to injure
- United States v. American Tobacco Company, 221 U.S. 106 (1911) found to have monopolized the trade.
- American Tobacco Co. v. United States, 328 U.S. 781 (1946) after American Tobacco Co was broken up, the four entities were found to have achieved a collectively dominant position, which still amounted to monopolization of the market contrary to the Sherman Act §2
- American Column & Lumber Co. v. United States, 257 US 377 (1921) information sharing
- Maple Flooring Manufacturers' Assn. v. United States, 268 U.S. 563 (1925)
- United States v. Container Corp., 393 U.S. 333 (1969)
- Airline Tariff Publishing Company, settlement with the US Department of Justice

=== Vertical restraints ===
Resale price maintenance

- Dr. Miles Medical Co. v. John D. Park and Sons, 220 U.S. 373 (1911) affirmed a lower court's holding that a massive minimum resale price maintenance scheme was unreasonable and thus offended Section 1 of the Sherman Antitrust Act.
- Kiefer-Stewart Co. v. Seagram & Sons, Inc., 340 U.S. 211 (1951) it was unlawful for private liquor dealers to require that their products only be resold up to a maximum price. It unduly restrained the freedom of businesses and was per se illegal.
- Albrecht v. Herald Co., 390 U.S. 145 (1968) setting a fixed price, minimum or maximum, held to violate section 1 of the Sherman Act
- State Oil Co. v. Khan, 522 U.S. 3 (1997) vertical maximum price fixing had to be adjudged according to a rule of reason
- Leegin Creative Leather Products, Inc. v. PSKS, Inc. 551 U.S. 877 (2007) 5 to 4 decision that vertical price restraints were not per se illegal. A leather manufacturer therefore did not violate the Sherman Act by stopping delivery of goods to a retailer after the retailer refused to raise its prices to the leather manufacturer's standards.

Outlet, territory or customer limitations

- Packard Motor Car Co. v. Webster Motor Car Co., 243 F.2d 418, 420 (D.C. Cir.), cert, denied, 355 U.S. 822 (1957)
- Continental Television v. GTE Sylvania, 433 U.S. 36 (1977) 6 to 2, held that it was not an antitrust violation, and it fell within the rule of reason, for a seller to limit the number of franchises and require the franchisees only sell goods within its area
- United States v. Colgate & Co., 250 U.S. 300 (1919) there is no unlawful action by a manufacturer or seller, who publicly announces a price policy, and then refuses to deal with businesses who do not subsequently comply with the policy. This is in contrast to agreements to maintain a certain price.
- United States v. Parke, Davis & Co., 362 U.S. 29 (1960) under Sherman Act §4
- Monsanto Co. v. Spray-Rite Service Corp., 465 U.S. 752 (1984), stating that, "under Colgate, the manufacturer can announce its re-sale prices in advance and refuse to deal with those who fail to comply, and a distributor is free to acquiesce to the manufacturer's demand in order to avoid termination". Monsanto, an agricultural chemical, terminated its distributorship agreement with Spray-Rite on the ground that it failed to hire trained salesmen and promote sales to dealers adequately. Held, not per se illegal, because the restriction related to non-price matters, and so was to be judged under the rule of reason.
- Business Electronics Corp. v. Sharp Electronics Corp., 485 U.S. 717 (1988) electronic calculators; "a vertical restraint is not illegal per se unless it includes some agreement on price or price levels. ... [T]here is a presumption in favor of a rule-of-reason standard; [and] departure from that standard must be justified by demonstrable economic effect, such as the facilitation of cartelizing ... "

== Mergers ==
Under Section 7 of the Clayton Act, a merger or acquisition is illegal if its effect "may be substantially to lessen competition, or to tend to create a monopoly."

No person engaged in commerce or in any activity affecting commerce shall acquire, directly or indirectly, the whole or any part of the stock or other share capital and no person subject to the jurisdiction of the Federal Trade Commission shall acquire the whole or any part of the assets of another person engaged also in commerce or in any activity affecting commerce, where in any line of commerce or in any activity affecting commerce in any section of the country, the effect of such acquisition may be substantially to lessen competition, or to tend to create a monopoly.

— Clayton Act, section 7 (15 U.S.C. § 18)

The FTC and the Justice Department both have the authority to file lawsuits seeking to block or invalidate a merger. The FTC may challenge a merger in its own administrative court instead of filing a lawsuit in a United States district court, although defendants can appeal the FTC's decisions to one of the United States courts of appeals. A private party may also file a lawsuit under the Clayton Act if an unlawful merger has injured its ability to compete for business.

Under the Hart–Scott–Rodino (HSR) Act of 1976, if a proposed merger and the parties executing it are both above certain sizes, then the parties must report it in advance to the FTC and the Justice Department. The parties must then wait 30 days while the FTC or the Justice Department reviews the merger and decides whether to seek to block it. The 30-day period usually ends with the FTC or Justice Department taking one of three actions: declining to challenge the merger, filing a lawsuit to challenge the merger, or issuing a "Second Request" that extends the waiting period and formally asks the party for all its documents and other information relating to the merger.

=== Horizontal mergers ===
- Northern Securities Co. v. United States, 193 U.S. 197 (1904) horizontal merger under the Sherman Act
- United States v. Philadelphia National Bank, 374 U.S. 321 (1963) the second and third largest of 42 banks in the Philadelphia area would lead to a 30% market control in a concentrated market, and so violated the Clayton Act §7. Banks were not exempt even though there was additional legislation under the Bank Merger Act of 1960.
- United States v. Von's Grocery Co., 384 U.S. 270 (1966) a merger of two grocery firms in the Los Angeles area did violate the Clayton Act §7, particularly considering the amendment by the Celler–Kefauver Act 1950
- United States v. General Dynamics Corp., 415 U.S. 486 (1974) General Dynamics Corp had taken control over, by share purchase, United Electric Coal Companies, a strip-mining coal producer.
- Horizontal Merger Guidelines (2010)
- FTC v. Staples, Inc., 970 F. Supp. 1066 (1997)
- Hospital Corp. of America v. FTC, 807 F. 2d 1381 (1986)
- Federal Trade Commission v. H.J. Heinz Co., 246 F.3d 708 (2001)
- United States v. Oracle Corp, 331 F. Supp. 2d 1098 (2004)

=== Vertical mergers ===
- United States v. Columbia Steel Co., 334 U.S. 495 (1948)
- United States v. E.I. Du Pont De Nemours & Co., 351 U.S. 377 (1956)
- Brown Shoe Co., Inc. v. United States, 370 U.S. 294 (1962) there is not one single test for whether a merger substantially lessens competition, but a variety of economic and other factors may be considered. Two shoe retailers and manufacturers merging was held to substantially lessen competition, given the market in towns over 10,000 people for men's, women's and children's shoes.

=== Conglomerate mergers ===
- United States v. Sidney W. Winslow, 227 U.S. 202 (1913)
- United States v. Continental Can Co., 378 U.S. 441 (1964) concerning the definition of the market segments in which the Continental Can Co was performing a merger.
- FTC v. Procter & Gamble Co., 386 U.S. 568 (1967)

== Monopoly and power ==
Every person who shall monopolize, or attempt to monopolize, or combine or conspire with any other person or persons, to monopolize any part of the trade or commerce among the several States, or with foreign nations, shall be deemed guilty of a felony, and, on conviction thereof, shall be punished by fine not exceeding $100,000,000 if a corporation, or, if any other person, $1,000,000, or by imprisonment not exceeding 10 years, or by both said punishments, in the discretion of the court.

— Sherman Act 1890 §2

The law's treatment of monopolies is potentially the strongest in the field of antitrust law. Judicial remedies can force large organizations to be broken up, subject them to positive obligations, impose massive penalties, and/or sentence implicated employees to jail. Under Section 2 of the Sherman Act, every "person who shall monopolize, or attempt to monopolize ... any part of the trade or commerce among the several States" commits an offence. The courts have interpreted this to mean that monopoly is not unlawful per se, but only if acquired through prohibited conduct. Historically, where the ability of judicial remedies to combat market power have ended, the legislature of states or the Federal government have still intervened by taking public ownership of an enterprise, or subjecting the industry to sector specific regulation (frequently done, for example, in the cases water, education, energy or health care). The law on public services and administration goes significantly beyond the realm of antitrust law's treatment of monopolies. When enterprises are not under public ownership, and where regulation does not foreclose the application of antitrust law, two requirements must be shown for the offense of monopolization. First, the alleged monopolist must possess sufficient power in an accurately defined market for its products or services. Second, the monopolist must have used its power in a prohibited way. The categories of prohibited conduct are not closed, and are contested in theory. Historically they have been held to include exclusive dealing, price discrimination, refusing to supply an essential facility, product tying and predatory pricing.

=== Monopolization ===
- Northern Securities Co. v. United States, 193 U.S. 197 (1904) 5 to 4, a railway monopoly, formed through a merger of 3 corporations was ordered to be dissolved. The owner, James Jerome Hill was forced to manage his ownership stake in each independently.
- Swift & Co. v. United States, 196 U.S. 375 (1905) the antitrust laws entitled the federal government to regulate monopolies that had a direct impact on commerce
- Standard Oil Co. of New Jersey v. United States, 221 U.S. 1 (1911) Standard Oil was dismantled into geographical entities given its size, and that it was too much of a monopoly
- United States v. American Tobacco Company, 221 U.S. 106 (1911) found to have monopolized the trade.
- United States v. Alcoa, 148 F.2d 416 (2d Cir. 1945) a monopoly can be deemed to exist depending on the size of the market. It was generally irrelevant how the monopoly was achieved since the fact of being dominant on the market was negative for competition. (Criticised by Alan Greenspan.)
- United States v. E. I. du Pont de Nemours & Co., 351 U.S. 377 (1956), illustrates the cellophane paradox of defining the relevant market. If a monopolist has set a price very high, there may now be many substitutable goods at similar prices, which could lead to a conclusion that the market share is small, and there is no monopoly. However, if a competitive price were charged, there would be a lower price, and so very few substitutes, whereupon the market share would be very high, and a monopoly established.
- United States v. Syufy Enterprises, 903 F.2d 659 (9th Cir. 1990) necessity of barriers to entry
- Lorain Journal Co. v. United States, 342 U.S. 143 (1951) attempted monopolization
- United States v. American Airlines, Inc., 743 F.2d 1114 (1985)
- Spectrum Sports, Inc. v. McQuillan, 506 U.S. 447 (1993) in order for monopolies to be found to have acted unlawfully, action must have actually been taken. The threat of abusive behavior is insufficient.
- Fraser v. Major League Soccer, 284 F.3d 47 (1st Cir. 2002) there could be no unlawful monopolization of the soccer market by MLS where no market previously existed
- United States v. Griffith 334 U.S. 100 (1948) four cinema corporations secured exclusive rights from distributors, foreclosing competitors. Specific intent to monopolize is not required, violating the Sherman Act §§1 and 2.
- United Shoe Machinery Corp v. U.S., 347 U.S. 521 (1954) exclusionary behavior
- United States v. Grinnell Corp., 384 U.S. 563 (1966) Grinnell made plumbing supplies and fire sprinklers, and with affiliates had 87% of the central station protective service market. From this predominant share there was no doubt of monopoly power.

=== Exclusive dealing ===
- Standard Oil Co. v. United States (Standard Stations), 337 U.S. 293 (1949): oil supply contracts affected a gross business of $58 million, comprising 6.7% of the total in a seven-state area, in the context of many similar arrangements, held to be contrary to Clayton Act §3.
- Tampa Electric Co. v. Nashville Coal Co., 365 U.S. 320 (1961): Tampa Electric Co contracted to buy coal for 20 years to provide power in Florida, and Nashville Coal Co later attempted to end the contract on the basis that it was an exclusive supply agreement contrary to the Clayton Act § 3 or the Sherman Act §§ 1 or 2. Held, no violation because foreclosed share of market was insignificant this did not affect competition sufficiently.
- US v. Delta Dental of Rhode Island, 943 F. Supp. 172 (1996)

=== Price discrimination ===
- Robinson–Patman Act
- Clayton Act 1914 §2 (15 USC §13)
- FTC v. Morton Salt Co.
- Volvo Trucks North America, Inc. v. Reeder-Simco Gmc, Inc.
- J. Truett Payne Co. v. Chrysler Motors Corp.
- FTC v. Henry Broch & Co.
- FTC v. Borden Co., commodities of like grade and quality
- United States v. Borden Co., the cost justification defense
- United States v. United States Gypsum Co., meeting the competition defense
- Falls City Industries v. Vanco Beverage, Inc.
- Great Atlantic & Pacific Tea Co. v. FTC

=== Essential facilities ===
- Aspen Skiing Co. v. Aspen Highlands Skiing Corp., 472 U.S. 585 (1985) the refusal of supply access to ski slopes violated the Sherman Act section 2.
- Eastman Kodak Company v. Image Technical Services, Inc., 504 U.S. 451 (1992) Kodak has refused to supply replacement parts to small businesses servicing Kodak equipment, which was alleged to violate the Sherman Act §§1 and 2. The Supreme Court held 6 to 3 that the small businesses were entitled to bring the case, and Kodak was not entitled to summary judgment.
- Verizon Communications v. Law Offices of Curtis V. Trinko, LLP, 540 U.S. 398 (2004) no extension of the essential facilities doctrine beyond that set in Aspen
- Otter Tail Power Co. v. United States, 410 U.S. 366 (1973)
- Berkey Photo, Inc v. Eastman Kodak Company, 603 F.2d 263 (2d Cir. 1979)
- United States v. AT&T (1982) led to the breakup of AT&T

=== Tying products ===
It shall be unlawful for any person engaged in commerce, in the course of such commerce, to lease or make a sale or contract for sale of goods, wares, merchandise, machinery, supplies, or other commodities, whether patented or unpatented, for use, consumption, or resale within the United States or any Territory thereof or the District of Columbia or any insular possession or other place under the jurisdiction of the United States, or fix a price charged therefor, or discount from, or rebate upon, such price, on the condition, agreement, or understanding that the lessee or purchaser thereof shall not use or deal in the goods, wares, merchandise, machinery, supplies, or other commodities of a competitor or competitors of the lessor or seller, where the effect of such lease, sale, or contract for sale or such condition, agreement, or understanding may be to substantially lessen competition or tend to create a monopoly in any line of commerce.

— Clayton Act 1914 §3
- Sherman Act 1890 §1, covers making purchase of goods conditional on purchase of other goods, if there is sufficient market power
- International Business Machines Corp. v. United States, 298 U.S. 131 (1936) requiring a leased machine to be operated only with supplies from IBM was contrary to Clayton Act §3.
- International Salt Co. v. United States, 332 U.S. 392 (1947) it would be a per se infringement of the Sherman Act §2 for a seller, who has a legal monopoly through a patent, to tie buyers to purchase products over which the seller does not have a patent
- United States v. Paramount Pictures, Inc., 334 US 131 (1948) Hollywood studios practice of requiring block booking was unlawful among other things
- Times-Picayune Publishing Co. v. United States, 345 U.S. 594 (1953) 5 to 4, where there was no market dominance in a product market, tying the sale of a morning and an evening newspaper together was not unlawful
- United States v. Loew's Inc., 371 U.S. 38 (1962) product bundling and price discrimination. The existence of a tie was sufficient to create a presumption of market power.
- Jefferson Parish Hospital District No. 2 v. Hyde, 466 U.S. 2 (1984) reversing Loew's, it was necessary to prove sufficient market power for a tying requirement to be anti-competitive
- United States v. Microsoft Corporation 253 F.3d 34 (2001) and District Court (1999) Microsoft ordered to be split into two for its monopolistic practices, including tying, but then the ruling was reversed by the Court of Appeals.

=== Predatory pricing ===
In theory predatory pricing happens when large companies with huge cash reserves and large lines of credit stifle competition by selling their products and services at a loss for a time, to force their smaller competitors out of business. With no competition, they are then free to consolidate control of the industry and charge whatever prices they wish. At this point, there is also little motivation for investing in further technological research, since there are no competitors left to gain an advantage over. High barriers to entry such as large upfront investment, notably named sunk costs, requirements in infrastructure and exclusive agreements with distributors, customers, and wholesalers ensure that it will be difficult for any new competitors to enter the market, and that if any do, the trust will have ample advance warning and time in which to either buy the competitor out, or engage in its own research and return to predatory pricing long enough to force the competitor out of business. Critics argue that the empirical evidence shows that "predatory pricing" does not work in practice and is better defeated by a truly free market than by antitrust laws (see Criticism of the theory of predatory pricing).

- Brooke Group Ltd. v. Brown & Williamson Tobacco Corp., 509 U.S. 209 (1993) to prove predatory pricing the plaintiff must show that changes in market conditions are adverse to its interests, and that (1) prices are below an appropriate measure of its rival's costs, and (2) the competitor had a reasonable prospect or a "dangerous probability" of recouping its investment in the alleged scheme.
- Weyerhaeuser Company v. Ross-Simmons Hardwood Lumber Company, 549 U.S. 312 (2007) a plaintiff must prove that, to make a claim of predatory buying, the alleged violator is likely to recoup the cost of the alleged predatory activity. This involved the saw mill market.
- Barry Wright Corp. v. ITT Grinnell Corp. 724 F2d 227 (1983)
- Spirit Airlines, Inc. v. Northwest Airlines, Inc., 431 F. 3d 917 (2005)
- United States v. E. I. du Pont de Nemours & Co., 351 U.S. 377 (1956)

=== Intellectual property ===
- Continental Paper Bag Co. v. Eastern Paper Bag Co., 210 U.S. 405 (1908) 8 to 1, concerning a self opening paper bag, it was not an unlawful use of a monopoly position to refuse to license a patent's use to others, since the essence of a patent was the freedom not to do so.
- United States v. Univis Lens Co., 316 U.S. 241 (1942) once a business sold its patented lenses, it was not allowed to lawfully control the use of the lens, by fixing a price for resale. This was the exhaustion doctrine.
- International Salt Co. v. United States, 332 U.S. 392 (1947) it would be a per se infringement of the Sherman Act §2 for a seller, who has a legal monopoly through a patent, to tie buyers to purchase products over which the seller does not have a patent
- Walker Process Equipment, Inc. v. Food Machinery & Chemical Corp., 382 U.S. 172 (1965) illegal monopolization through the maintenance and enforcement of a patent obtained via fraud on the Patent Office case, sometimes called "Walker Process fraud".
- United States v. Glaxo Group Ltd., 410 U.S. 52 (1973) the government may challenge a patent where it is involved in a monopoly violation
- Illinois Tool Works Inc. v. Independent Ink, Inc., 547 U.S. 28 (2006) there is no presumption of market power, in a case on an unlawful tying arrangement, from the mere fact that the defendant has a patented product
- Apple Inc. litigation and United States v. Apple Inc.

== Scope of antitrust law ==
Antitrust laws do not apply to, or are modified in, several specific categories of enterprise (including sports, media, utilities, health care, insurance, banks, and financial markets) and for several kinds of actor (such as employees or consumers taking collective action).

=== Collective actions ===
First, since the Clayton Act 1914 §6, there is no application of antitrust laws to agreements between employees to form or act in labor unions. This was seen as the "Bill of Rights" for labor, as the Act laid down that the "labor of a human being is not a commodity or article of commerce". The purpose was to ensure that employees with unequal bargaining power were not prevented from combining in the same way that their employers could combine in corporations, subject to the restrictions on mergers that the Clayton Act set out. However, sufficiently autonomous workers, such as professional sports players have been held to fall within antitrust provisions.

=== Pro sports exemptions and the NFL cartel ===
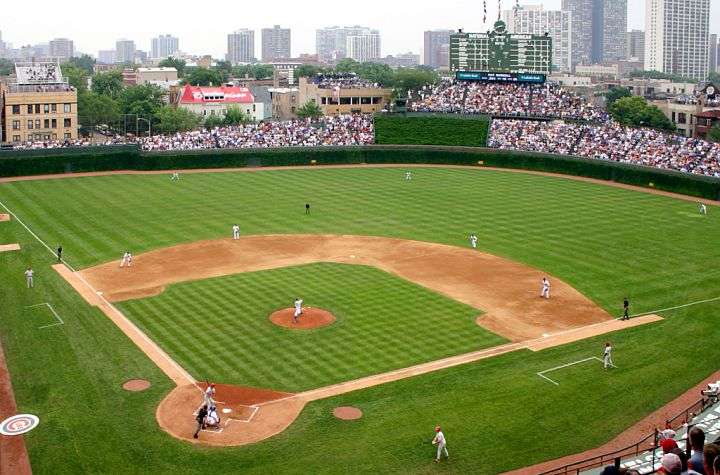
Since 1922 the courts and Congress have left Major League Baseball, as played at Chicago's Wrigley Field, unrestrained by antitrust laws.

Second, professional sports leagues enjoy a number of exemptions. Mergers and joint agreements of professional football, hockey, baseball, and basketball leagues are exempt. Major League Baseball was held to be broadly exempt from antitrust law in the Supreme Court case Federal Baseball Club v. National League (1922). The court unanimously held that the baseball league's organization meant that there was no commerce between the states taking place, even though teams traveled across state lines to put on the games. That travel was merely incidental to a business which took place in each state. It was subsequently held in Toolson v. New York Yankees (1953), and then again in Flood v. Kuhn (1972), that the baseball league's exemption was an "aberration". However Congress had accepted it, and favored it, so retroactively overruling the exemption was no longer a matter for the courts, but the legislature. In United States v. International Boxing Club of New York (1955), it was held that, unlike baseball, boxing was not exempt, and in Radovich v. National Football League (1957), professional football is generally subject to antitrust laws. As a result of the AFL-NFL merger, the National Football League was also given exemptions in exchange for certain conditions, such as not directly competing with college or high school football. However, the 2010 Supreme Court ruling in American Needle Inc. v. NFL characterised the NFL as a "cartel" of 32 independent businesses subject to antitrust law, not a single entity.

=== Media ===
Third, antitrust laws are modified where they are perceived to encroach upon the media and free speech, or are not strong enough. Newspapers under joint operating agreements are allowed limited antitrust immunity under the Newspaper Preservation Act of 1970. More generally, and partly because of concerns about media cross-ownership in the United States, regulation of media is subject to specific statutes, chiefly the Communications Act of 1934 and the Telecommunications Act of 1996, under the guidance of the Federal Communications Commission. The historical policy has been to use the state's licensing powers over the airwaves to promote plurality. Antitrust laws do not prevent companies from using the legal system or political process to attempt to reduce competition. Most of these activities are considered legal under the Noerr-Pennington doctrine. Also, regulations by states may be immune under the Parker immunity doctrine.

- Professional Real Estate Investors, Inc., v. Columbia Pictures, 508 U.S. 49 (1993)
- Allied Tube v. Indian Head, Inc., 486 U.S. 492 (1988)
- FTC v. Superior Ct. TLA, 493 U.S. 411 (1990)

=== Other ===
Fourth, the government may grant monopolies in certain industries such as utilities and infrastructure where multiple players are seen as unfeasible or impractical.

Fifth, insurance is allowed limited antitrust exemptions as provided by the McCarran-Ferguson Act of 1945.

Sixth, M&A transactions in the defense sector are often subject to greater antitrust scrutiny from the Department of Justice and the Federal Trade Commission.

- United States v. South-Eastern Underwriters Association, 322 U.S. 533 (1944) the insurance industry was not exempt from antitrust regulation.
- Credit Suisse v. Billing, 551 U.S. 264 (2007) 7 to 1, the industries regulated by the Securities Act 1933 and the Securities and Exchange Act 1934 are exempt from antitrust lawsuits.
- Parker v. Brown, 317 U.S. 341 (1943) actions by state governments were held to be exempt from antitrust law, given that there was no original legislative intent to cover anything other than business combinations.
- Goldfarb v. Virginia State Bar, 421 U.S. 773 (1975) the Virginia State Bar, which was delegated power to set price schedules for lawyers fees, was an unlawful price fixing. It was no longer exempt from the Sherman Act, and constituted a per se infringement.
- California Retail Liquor Dealers Assn. v. Midcal Aluminum, Inc., 445 U.S. 97 (1980) the state of California acted contrary to the Sherman Act 1890 §1 by setting fair trade wine price schedules.
- Rice v. Norman Williams Co., 458 U.S. 654 (1982) the Sherman Act did not prohibit a California law which prohibited the importation of goods that were not authorised to be imported by the manufacturer.
- Tritent International Corp. v. Commonwealth of Kentucky, 467 F.3d 547 (2006) Kentucky had not acted unlawfully by giving effect to a Tobacco Master Settlement Agreement, because there was no illegal behavior in it.
- United States v. Trans-Missouri Freight Association, 166 U.S. 290 (1897) the antitrust laws applied to the railroad industry, even though there was a comprehensive scheme of legislation applying to the railroads already. No specific exemption had been given.
- Silver v. New York Stock Exchange, 373 U.S. 341 (1963) the NYSE was not exempt from antitrust regulation, even though many of its activities were regulated by the Securities and Exchange Act 1934.
- American Society of Mechanical Engineers v. Hydrolevel Corporation, 456 U.S. 556 (1982) 6 to 3, that the American Society of Mechanical Engineers, a non profit standard developer had violated the Sherman Act by giving information to one competitor, used against another.
- National Collegiate Athletic Association v. Alston, 594 U.S. ___ (2021) 9 to 0, the National Collegiate Athletic Association's caps on player compensation, most notably its restrictions on education benefits for players, restrain competition among colleges and thereby violate the nation's antitrust laws.

== Remedies and enforcement ==
The several district courts of the United States are invested with jurisdiction to prevent and restrain violations of sections 1 to 7 of this title; and it shall be the duty of the several United States attorneys, in their respective districts, under the direction of the Attorney General, to institute proceedings in equity to prevent and restrain such violations. Such proceedings may be by way of petition setting forth the case and praying that such violation shall be enjoined or otherwise prohibited. When the parties complained of shall have been duly notified of such petition the court shall proceed, as soon as may be, to the hearing and determination of the case; and pending such petition and before final decree, the court may at any time make such temporary restraining order or prohibition as shall be deemed just in the premises.

— Sherman Act 1890 §4

The remedies for violations of U.S. antitrust laws are as broad as any equitable remedy that a court has the power to make, as well as being able to impose penalties. When private parties have suffered an actionable loss, they may claim compensation. Under the Sherman Act 1890 §7, these may be trebled, a measure to encourage private litigation to enforce the laws and act as a deterrent. The courts may award penalties under §§1 and 2, which are measured according to the size of the company or the business. In their inherent jurisdiction to prevent violations in future, the courts have additionally exercised the power to break up businesses into competing parts under different owners, although this remedy has rarely been exercised (examples include Standard Oil, Northern Securities Company, American Tobacco Company, AT&T Corporation and, although reversed on appeal, Microsoft). Three levels of enforcement come from the Federal government, primarily through the Department of Justice and the Federal Trade Commission, the governments of states, and private parties. Public enforcement of antitrust laws is seen as important, given the cost, complexity and daunting task for private parties to bring litigation, particularly against large corporations.

=== Federal government ===
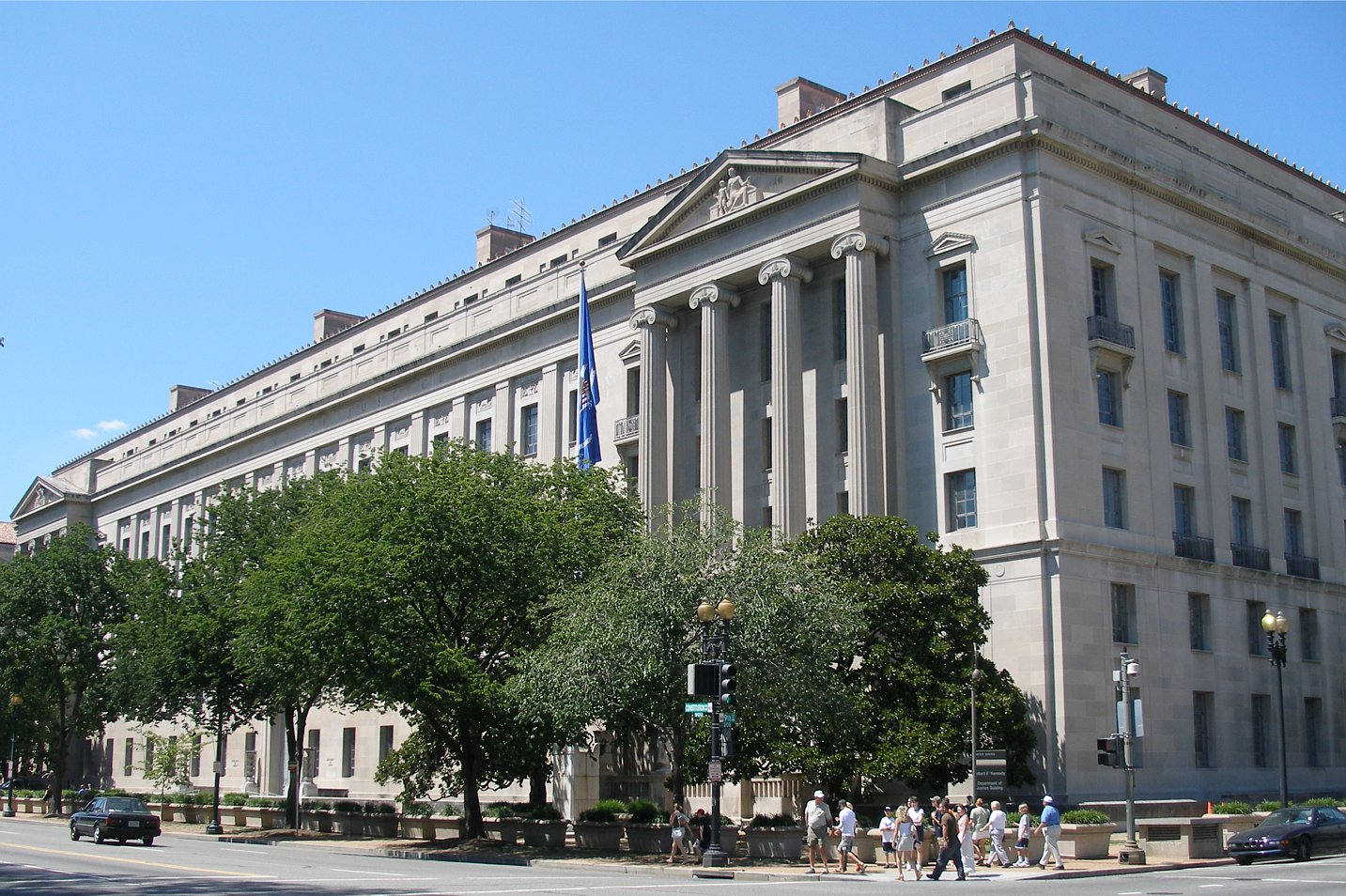
Along with the Federal Trade Commission the Department of Justice in Washington, D.C. is the public enforcer of antitrust law.

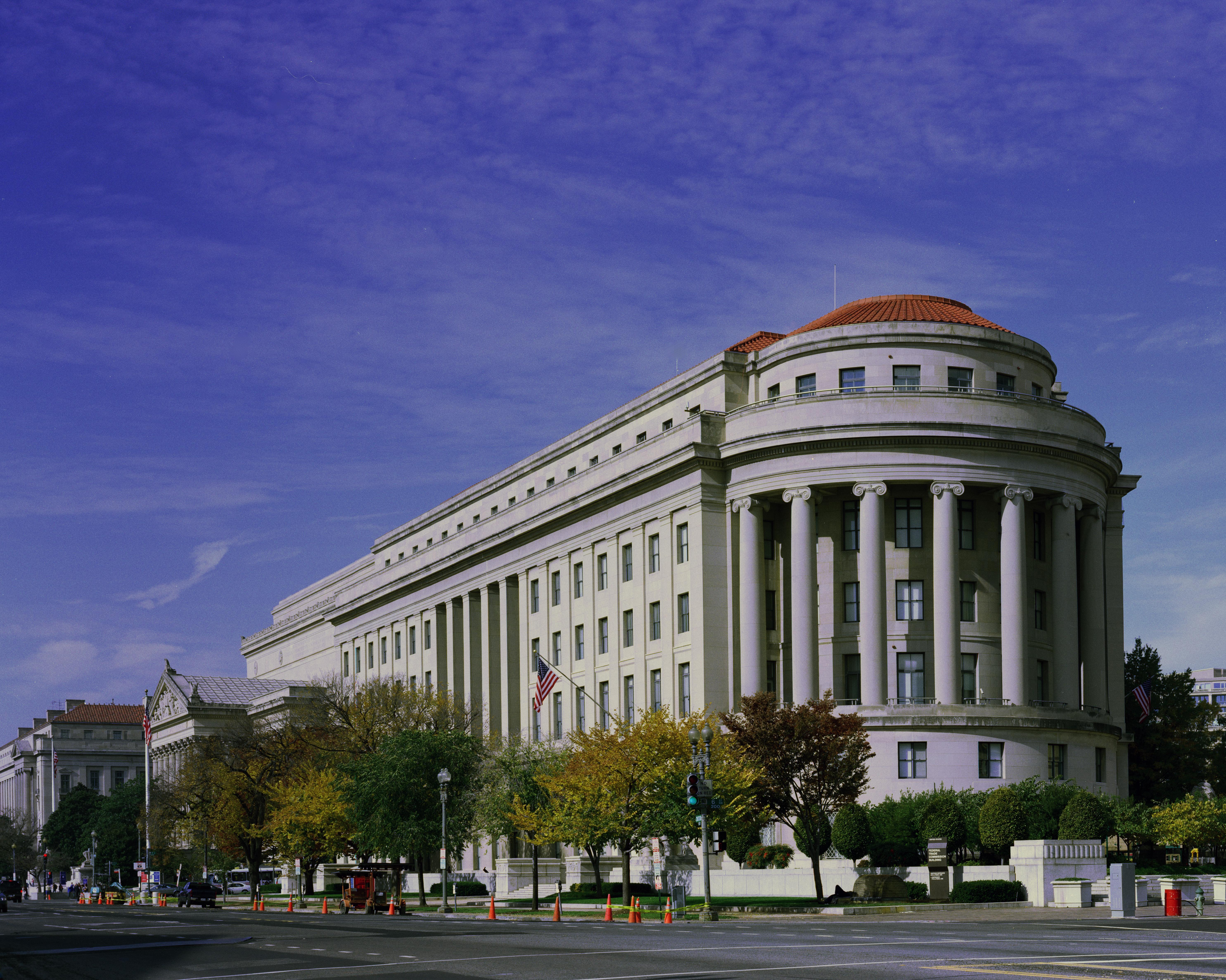
Federal Trade Commission building, view from southeast

The federal government, via both the Antitrust Division of the United States Department of Justice and the Federal Trade Commission, can bring civil lawsuits enforcing the laws. The United States Department of Justice alone may bring criminal antitrust suits under federal antitrust laws. Perhaps the most famous antitrust enforcement actions brought by the federal government were the break-up of AT&T's local telephone service monopoly in the early 1980s and its actions against Microsoft in the late 1990s.

Additionally, the federal government also reviews potential mergers to attempt to prevent market concentration. As outlined by the Hart-Scott-Rodino Antitrust Improvements Act, larger companies attempting to merge must first notify the Federal Trade Commission and the Department of Justice's Antitrust Division prior to consummating a merger. These agencies then review the proposed merger first by defining what the market is and then determining the market concentration using the Herfindahl-Hirschman Index (HHI) and each company's market share. The government looks to avoid allowing a company to develop market power, which if left unchecked could lead to monopoly power.

The United States Department of Justice and Federal Trade Commission target nonreportable mergers for enforcement as well. Notably, between 2009 and 2013, 20% of all merger investigations conducted by the United States Department of Justice involved nonreportable transactions.

FTC v. Sperry & Hutchinson Trading Stamp Co., 405 U.S. 233 (1972). Case held that the FTC is entitled to bring enforcement action against businesses that act unfairly, as where supermarket trading stamps company injured consumers by prohibiting them from exchanging trading stamps. The FTC could prevent the restrictive practice as unfair, even though there was no specific antitrust violation.

==== International cooperation ====
Despite considerable effort by the Clinton administration, the Federal government attempted to extend antitrust cooperation with other countries for mutual detection, prosecution and enforcement. A bill was unanimously passed by the US Congress; however by 2000 only one treaty has been signed with Australia. On 3 July 2017 the Australian Competition & Consumer Commission announced it was seeking explanations from a US company, Apple In relation to potentially anticompetitive behaviour against an Australian bank in possible relation to Apple Pay. It is not known whether the treaty could influence the enquiry or outcome.

In many cases large US companies tend to deal with overseas antitrust within the overseas jurisdiction, autonomous of US laws, such as in Microsoft Corp v Commission and more recently, Google v European Union where the companies were heavily fined. Questions have been raised with regards to the consistency of antitrust between jurisdictions where the same antitrust corporate behaviour, and similar antitrust legal environment, is prosecuted in one jurisdiction but not another.

=== State governments ===
State attorneys general may file suits to enforce both state and federal antitrust laws.

- Parens patriae
- Hawaii v. Standard Oil Co. of Cal., 405 U.S. 251 (1972) state governments do not have a cause of action to sue for consequential loss for damage to their general economies after an antitrust violation is found.

=== Private suits ===
Private parties can file lawsuits, in both state and federal court, against violators of state and federal antitrust law. Federal antitrust laws, as well as most state laws, provide for "treble" (triple) damages against antitrust violators in order to encourage private lawsuit enforcement of antitrust law. Thus, if a company is sued for monopolizing a market and the jury concludes the conduct resulted in consumers' being overcharged $200,000, that amount will automatically be tripled, so the injured consumers will receive $600,000. The United States Supreme Court summarized why Congress authorized private antitrust lawsuits in the case Hawaii v. Standard Oil Co. of Cal., 405 U.S. 251, 262 (1972):

Every violation of the antitrust laws is a blow to the free-enterprise system envisaged by Congress. This system depends on strong competition for its health and vigor, and strong competition depends, in turn, on compliance with antitrust legislation. In enacting these laws, Congress had many means at its disposal to penalize violators. It could have, for example, required violators to compensate federal, state, and local governments for the estimated damage to their respective economies caused by the violations. But, this remedy was not selected. Instead, Congress chose to permit all persons to sue to recover three times their actual damages every time they were injured in their business or property by an antitrust violation. By offering potential litigants the prospect of a recovery in three times the amount of their damages, Congress encouraged these persons to serve as "private attorneys general".

- Pfizer, Inc. v. Government of India, 434 U.S. 308 (1978) foreign governments have standing to sue in private actions in the U.S. courts.
- Bigelow v. RKO Radio Pictures, Inc., 327 U.S. 251 (1946) treble damages awarded under the Clayton Act §4 needed not to be mathematically precise, but based on a reasonable estimate of loss, and not speculative. This meant a jury could set a higher estimate of how much movie theaters lost, when the film distributors conspired with other theaters to let them show films first.
- Illinois Brick Co. v. Illinois, 431 U.S. 720 (1977) indirect purchasers of goods where prices have been raised have no standing to sue. Only the direct contractors of cartel members may, to avoid double or multiple recovery.
- Mitsubishi Motors Corp. v. Soler Chrysler-Plymouth, Inc., 473 U.S. 614 (1985) on arbitration

== Theory ==
The Supreme Court calls the Sherman Antitrust Act a "charter of freedom", designed to protect free enterprise in America. One view of the statutory purpose, urged for example by Justice Douglas, was that the goal was not only to protect consumers, but at least as importantly to prohibit the use of power to control the marketplace.

We have here the problem of bigness. Its lesson should by now have been burned into our memory by Brandeis. The Curse of Bigness shows how size can become a menace--both industrial and social. It can be an industrial menace because it creates gross inequalities against existing or putative competitors. It can be a social menace ... In final analysis, size in steel is the measure of the power of a handful of men over our economy ... The philosophy of the Sherman Act is that it should not exist ... Industrial power should be decentralized. It should be scattered into many hands so that the fortunes of the people will not be dependent on the whim or caprice, the political prejudices, the emotional stability of a few self-appointed men ... That is the philosophy and the command of the Sherman Act. It is founded on a theory of hostility to the concentration in private hands of power so great that only a government of the people should have it.

— Dissenting opinion of Justice Douglas in United States v. Columbia Steel Co.

Contrary to this are efficiency arguments that antitrust legislation should be changed to primarily benefit consumers, and have no other purpose. Free market economist Milton Friedman states that he initially agreed with the underlying principles of antitrust laws (breaking up monopolies and oligopolies and promoting more competition), but that he came to the conclusion that they do more harm than good. Thomas Sowell argues that, even if a superior business drives out a competitor, it does not follow that competition has ended:

In short, the financial demise of a competitor is not the same as getting rid of competition. The courts have long paid lip service to the distinction that economists make between competition—a set of economic conditions—and existing competitors, though it is hard to see how much difference that has made in judicial decisions. Too often, it seems, if you have hurt competitors, then you have hurt competition, as far as the judges are concerned.

Alan Greenspan argues that the very existence of antitrust laws discourages businessmen from some activities that might be socially useful out of fear that their business actions will be determined illegal and dismantled by government. In his essay entitled Antitrust, he says: "No one will ever know what new products, processes, machines, and cost-saving mergers failed to come into existence, killed by the Sherman Act before they were born. No one can ever compute the price that all of us have paid for that Act which, by inducing less effective use of capital, has kept our standard of living lower than would otherwise have been possible." Those, like Greenspan, who oppose antitrust tend not to support competition as an end in itself but for its results—low prices. As long as a monopoly is not a coercive monopoly where a firm is securely insulated from potential competition, it is argued that the firm must keep prices low in order to discourage competition from arising. Hence, legal action is uncalled for and wrongly harms the firm and consumers.

Thomas DiLorenzo, an adherent of the Austrian School of economics, found that the "trusts" of the late 19th century were dropping their prices faster than the rest of the economy, and he holds that they were not monopolists at all. Ayn Rand, the American writer, provides a moral argument against antitrust laws. She holds that these laws in principle criminalize any person engaged in making a business successful, and, thus, are gross violations of their individual expectations. Such laissez-faire advocates suggest that only a coercive monopoly should be broken up, that is the persistent, exclusive control of a vitally needed resource, good, or service such that the community is at the mercy of the controller, and where there are no suppliers of the same or substitute goods to which the consumer can turn. In such a monopoly, the monopolist is able to make pricing and production decisions without an eye on competitive market forces and is able to curtail production to price-gouge consumers. Laissez-faire advocates argue that such a monopoly can only come about through the use of physical coercion or fraudulent means by the corporation or by government intervention, and that there is no case of a coercive monopoly ever existing that was not the result of government policies.

Judge Robert Bork's writings on antitrust law (particularly The Antitrust Paradox), along with those of Richard Posner and other law and economics thinkers, were heavily influential in causing a shift in the U.S. Supreme Court's approach to antitrust laws since the 1970s, to be focused solely on what is best for the consumer rather than the company's practices.

== See also ==
- Thurman Arnold
- Barton–Rush Bill, a proposed franchise competition bill
- Contestable market
- DRAM price fixing
- Duopoly
- Economic regulator
- EU competition law
- Government monopoly
- Commissioner Andrew L. Harris
- Limit price
- Market anomaly
- Monopsony
- New Brandeis movement
- Ordoliberalism
- Patent pool
- SSNIP Test
- Trade Practices Act 1974: Australian antitrust legislation
