= FTC v. Qualcomm =

American antitrust case

Federal Trade Commission v. Qualcomm Incorporated was a noted American antitrust case, in which the Federal Trade Commission (FTC) accused Qualcomm's licensing agreements as anticompetitive, mainly because their practices excluded competition and harmed competitors in the modern chip market, which according to the FTC, violated both Section 1 and Section 2 of the Sherman Act. On May 21, 2019, the United States District Court for the Northern District of California ruled in favor of the plaintiff, the FTC, by alleging that Qualcomm had indeed violated the federal antitrust laws by (1) refusing to license its patents to direct competitors, in its relevant product market (2) by placing an extra fee on rival chip sales through its licensing of its patent, and (3) by entering in an exclusive business deal with Apple from 2011 to 2013. The case was seen as controversial when the United States Court of Appeals for the Ninth Circuit decided to unanimously reverse the decision of the district court by arguing that the FTC failed to prove through its rule of reason analysis that Qualcomm's policies have a considerable negative effect towards the consumer in the CDMA and cellular chips market.

== Background ==
On January 27, 2017, the FTC filed an antitrust lawsuit against Qualcomm Inc. in the United States District Court for the Northern District of California. The FTC, alleged that Qualcomm Inc, had represented unlawful anticompetitive behavior in two relevant markets for modern chips, which include: CDMA and 4G LTE cellular chips. The FTC argued that Qualcomm Inc represented anticompetitive behavior by employing its "no license - no chips" policy, in which Qualcomm maintained a controlling market share by (1) by requiring its customers to license Qualcomm's patents before, they could purchase any telephonic chips (2) by declining to license its chips to any direct competitor, and (3) by creating exclusive dealing agreements with Apple. The FTC alleged that these practices were anticompetitive, but at the same time they violated Section 5 of the FTC Act.

== Preliminary rulings ==
Throughout the lawsuit, there were two preliminary rulings. The first one occurred when the court decided to reject Qualcomm's motion to dismiss the case, based on the fact that the court found that all three of the FTC's claims were allegedly valid. The second took place on November 6, 2018, when the court granted the FTC's petition to present a partial summary judgement. In such judgement, the FTC presented the patent policies of the Alliance of Telecommunications Industry Solutions (ATIS) and the Telecommunications Industry Association (TIA), regarding a matter of contractual law, in which it pointed out that Qualcomm had to fairly distribute its licenses to all applicants, even if it meant distributing them to a direct rival. The FTC requested that the court maintain its contractual obligation on the two previously mentioned organization, to which the court agreed to and therefore limited Qualcomm's contractual obligations to the standard of ATIS and TIA.

== District Court decision ==
After a 10-day bench trial in January 2019, the court presented its decision in favor of the FTC on May 21, 2019. Based on Section 2 of the Sherman Act, the courts began by defining the two relevant markets in the case, which were the CDMA market and the LTE modern chip market. The definition of these markets was essential to FTC's case, seeing that the definitions of relevant market pointed out by the court, allowed the court to conclude that Qualcomm had a substantial market share in both markets and therefore held monopoly power.

With the establishment of the relevant market, the courts went on to explain its decision on the three antitrust claims presented by the FTC. Firstly, the court concluded that Qualcomm had been anticompetitive by using its market share in the CDMA and LTE chip markets to force its clients to take out licenses for its patents before being able to buy from them, rather than just providing the licensing permission on the sale, which was the industry standard. The courts pointed out that these standard were anticompetitive, seeing that it allowed Qualcomm to obtain higher royalty rates but it also allowed them to create exclusive supply arrangements.

Secondly, the courts evaluated the FTC's claim regarding whether Qualcomm had an obligation to license its chips to rival competitors (as outlined by the standard of ATIS and TIA), and by not doing so, Qualcomm broke antitrust laws and harmed competition. The court found that Qualcomm was hesitant to provide an all exclusive license that allowed its rivals to manufacture and sell its chips; however, it did provide other settlements that would not exhaust its right to license directly. However, based on the court's earlier ruling regarding the FTC'S motion for partial summary judgment, the court found that these other offers did not meet Qualcomm's contractual obligations under the TIA and the ATIS. The court ruled that Qualcomm had broken antitrust rules, seeing that it unjustifiably imposed costs on its direct rival(s) and harmed competition by not following its contractual obligation.

Lastly, the court analyzed the FTC's third claim regarding Qualcomm's exclusive agreement with Apple, focusing on the two companies' contractual agreements from 2011 to 2013. In 2011, Apple and Qualcomm entered into an agreement in which Apple received incentive payments, intending to encourage them to transition towards the usage of Qualcomm's chips. Under this agreement, Apple was conditioned to meet a certain volume target; however, they could face termination if the company sold products that did not use Qualcomm's chips. In 2013, the parties extended their agreement to expand into the usage of Qualcomm's chips in Apple's iPhones and iPads.

The court ruled that the two companies' contractual agreements from 2011 to 2013 were "de facto" exclusive agreements that "coerced" Apple into buying a substantial portion of its chips from Qualcomm. The court ruled that the agreements violated antitrust laws seeing that it harmed competition by preventing rivals from accessing a substantial market.

== The Ninth's Circuit Opinion ==
The Ninth Circuit reversed parts of the lower court's judgment, emphasizing that Qualcomm's business practices, particularly regarding licensing and sales conditions, did not meet the threshold for anti-competitive behavior as defined under antitrust laws. Anticompetitive behavior is illegal under federal antitrust law. Hypercompetitive behavior is not. Qualcomm has exercised market dominance in the 3G and 4G cellular modem chip markets for many years, and its business practices have played a powerful and disruptive role in those markets, as well as in the broader cellular services and technology markets.

The job for antitrust law is not to condone or punish certain firm's success. Quote from the court decision: "First, Qualcomm's practice of licensing its SEPs exclusively at the OEM level does not amount to anticompetitive conduct in violation of , as Qualcomm is under no antitrust duty to license rival chip suppliers. To the extent Qualcomm has breached any of its FRAND commitments, a conclusion we need not and do not reach, the remedy for such a breach lies in contract and patent law. Second, Qualcomm's patent-licensing royalties and “no license, no chips” policy do not impose an anticompetitive surcharge on rivals’ modem chip sales. Instead, these aspects of Qualcomm's business model are “chip-supplier neutral” and do not undermine competition in the relevant antitrust markets. Third, Qualcomm's 2011 and 2013 agreements with Apple have not had the actual or practical effect of substantially foreclosing competition in the CDMA modem chip market. Furthermore, because these agreements were terminated years ago by Apple itself, there is nothing to be enjoined.

The court therefore REVERSED the district court's judgment and VACATE its injunction as well as its partial grant of summary judgment.
