= Chicago Board of Trade v. United States =

- Supreme Court of the United States

Argued December 18–19, 1917 Decided March 4, 1918
- Full case name: Chicago Board of Trade v. United States
- Citations: 246 U.S. 231 (more) 38 S. Ct. 242; 62 L. Ed. 683; 1918 U.S. LEXIS 1538

Case history
- Prior: On writ of certiorari to the United States District Court for the Northern District of Illinois

Holding
- The "call rule" of the Chicago Board of Trade was ultimately procompetitive, and did not violate the Sherman Act.

Court membership
- Chief Justice Edward D. White Associate Justices Joseph McKenna · Oliver W. Holmes Jr. William R. Day · Willis Van Devanter; Mahlon Pitney · James C. McReynolds; Louis Brandeis · John H. Clarke

Case opinion
- Majority: Brandeis, joined by unanimous
- McReynolds took no part in the consideration or decision of the case.

Laws applied
- Sherman Antitrust Act

Chicago Board of Trade v. United States, 246 U.S. 231 (1918), was a case in which the Supreme Court of the United States applied the "rule of reason" to the internal trading rules of a commodity market. Section 1 of the Sherman Act flatly states: "Every contract, combination in the form of trust or otherwise, or conspiracy, in restraint of trade or commerce among the several States, or with foreign nations, is declared to be illegal." However, in evaluating the U.S. government's allegations that the Chicago Board of Trade's rules on grain prices violated the Act, the Supreme Court rejected a strict interpretation of its language: "The true test of legality is whether the restraint imposed is such as merely regulates and perhaps thereby promotes competition or whether it is such as may suppress or even destroy competition."

== Background ==
The Chicago Board of Trade (CBOT) is a commodity market, dealing in spot sales (for example, sales of grain stored in Chicago and ready for delivery), future sales (grain to be purchased for delivery at a later time), and “to arrive” orders (grain which is en route to Chicago). CBOT introduced a new “call rule” which regulated board members buying or selling sales of “to arrive” orders—at the close of the call session (which at that point was 2:00 p.m Central Time), the price of grain is set and dealers are unable to sell grain at any other price. The United States Department of Justice accused CBOT of price-fixing, and, in 1913, filed suit against the Board in the United States District Court for the Northern District of Illinois.

At trial, CBOT asserted that the rule did not have any unlawful purpose, but rather was set up to curb certain pre-existing problems and abuses. CBOT claimed that a group of agents were lowering discounts on commissions to those people buying grain after hours. These agents would wait until after hours, and then buyers would get cheaper prices. CBOT wanted to curb the power of these monopsony/oligopsony type of buyers by making prices the same for everyone after hours. Also, the rule shortened the traders’ work hours, for the convenience of its members.

Ultimately, however, the District Court did not issue an opinion. The Justice Department and CBOT entered into a consent decree under which enjoined them from acting upon the same or from adopting or acting upon any similar rule.

== Judgment ==
Justice Brandeis, writing for a unanimous court, first observed that every trade association and board of trade imposes some restraint upon the conduct of its members. He explained the essence of the Rule of Reason: "The true test of legality is whether the restraint imposed is such as merely regulates and perhaps thereby promotes competition or whether it is such as may suppress or even destroy competition." Whether or not a rule restrains trade in violation of the Sherman Act thus turns on the facts and circumstances of each particular case.

He then examined the nature, scope, effect, and history of the rule. He held that the call rule was ultimately procompetitive in purpose and effect. The scope of the rule was such that it only operated during certain times of day, and affects only small percentage of the grain market. The rule helped to create public market for grain and made pricing more transparent. It decreased the market power of dominant sellers and made sure that prices were set by open competitive bidding. The decree of the District Court was reversed.

== See also ==
- US antitrust law
