= Hawaii v. Standard Oil Co. of California =

Hawaii v. Standard Oil Co. of Cal.
- Supreme Court of the United States

Argued October 21, 1971 Decided March 1, 1972
- Full case name: Hawaii v. Standard Oil Company of California, et al.
- Citations: 405 U.S. 251 (more) 92 S.Ct. 885; 31 L. Ed. 2d 184; 1972 U.S. LEXIS 111

Case history
- Prior: 431 F.2d 1282; 1970 Trade Cases ¶ 73,340 (9th Cir. 1970)

Holding
- Section 4 of the Clayton Act does not authorize a State to sue for damages for an injury to its general economy allegedly attributable to a violation of the antitrust laws.

Court membership
- Chief Justice Warren E. Burger Associate Justices William O. Douglas · William J. Brennan Jr. Potter Stewart · Byron White; Thurgood Marshall · Harry Blackmun; Lewis F. Powell Jr. · William Rehnquist

Case opinions
- Majority: Marshall, joined by Burger, Stewart, White, Blackmun
- Dissent: Douglas
- Dissent: Brennan, joined by Douglas
- Powell, Rehnquist took no part in the consideration or decision of the case.

Hawaii v. Standard Oil Co. of Cal., 405 U.S. 251 (1972), was a decision by the United States Supreme Court which held that Section 4 of the Clayton Antitrust Act does not authorize a U.S. state to sue for damages for an injury to its general economy allegedly attributable to a violation of the United States antitrust law.

== See also ==
- List of United States Supreme Court cases, volume 405
