= Rule of reason =

American legal doctrine

The rule of reason is a legal doctrine used to interpret the Sherman Antitrust Act, one of the cornerstones of United States antitrust law. While some actions like price-fixing are considered illegal per se, other actions, such as possession of a monopoly, must be analyzed under the rule of reason and are only considered illegal when their effect is to unreasonably restrain trade. William Howard Taft, then Chief Judge of the Sixth Circuit Court of Appeals, first developed the doctrine in a ruling on Addyston Pipe and Steel Co. v. United States, which was affirmed in 1899 by the Supreme Court. The doctrine also played a major role in the 1911 Supreme Court case Standard Oil Company of New Jersey v. United States.

== History ==
Upon its development some critics of Standard Oil, including the lone dissenter Justice John Marshall Harlan, argued that Standard Oil and its rule of reason were a departure from previous Sherman Act case law, which purportedly had interpreted the language of the Sherman Act to hold that all contracts restraining trade were prohibited, regardless of whether the restraint actually produced ill effects. These critics emphasized in particular the Court's decision in United States v. Trans-Missouri Freight Association, 166 U.S. 290 (1897), which contains some language suggesting that a mere restriction on the autonomy of traders would suffice to establish that an agreement restrained trade within the meaning of the Act.

Others, including William Howard Taft and Robert Bork, argued that the decision and the principle it announced was entirely consistent with earlier case law. These scholars argue that much language in Trans-Missouri Freight was dicta, and also emphasized the Court's decision in United States v. Joint Traffic Association, 171 U.S. 505 (1898), in which the Court announced that "ordinary contracts and combinations" did not offend the Sherman Act, because they restrained trade only "indirectly". Indeed, in his 1912 book on antitrust law, Taft reported that no critic of Standard Oil could succeed in Taft's challenge: to articulate one scenario in which the rule of reason would produce a result different from that produced under prior case law. In 1911, the Supreme Court announced United States v. American Tobacco Co., 221 U.S. 106 (1911). That decision held that Section 2 of the Sherman Act, which bans monopolization, did not ban the mere possession of a monopoly but banned only the unreasonable acquisition or maintenance of monopoly. This reflects a long-standing view that one can have a monopoly just by having a superior product and that it violates no law to produce such a product.

In 1918, seven years later, the Court unanimously reaffirmed the rule of reason in Chicago Board of Trade v. United States. In an opinion written by Justice Louis Brandeis, the Court held that an agreement between rivals limiting rivalry on price after an exchange was closed was reasonable and thus did not violate the Sherman Act. The Court rejected a strict interpretation of the Sherman Act's language: "The true test of legality is whether the restraint imposed is such as merely regulates and perhaps thereby promotes competition or whether it is such as may suppress or even destroy competition." The Court did so mostly because the agreement was regulatory rather than anticompetitive.

The rule was narrowed in later cases that held that certain kinds of restraints, such as price fixing agreements, group boycotts, and geographical market divisions, were illegal per se. These decisions followed up on the suggestion in Standard Oil that courts can determine that certain restraints are unreasonable based simply upon the "nature and character" of the agreement.

More recently, the Supreme Court has removed a number of restraints from the category deemed unlawful per se and instead subjected them to fact-based rule of reason analysis. These include non-price vertical restraints in 1977's Continental Television v. GTE Sylvania, maximum resale price maintenance agreements in 1997's State Oil v. Khan, and minimum resale price maintenance agreements in 2007's Leegin Creative Leather Products, Inc. v. PSKS, Inc.

Moreover, the Supreme Court has reaffirmed the conclusion in Standard Oil that analysis under the rule of reason should focus on the economic but not the social consequences of a restraint (National Society of Professional Engineers v. United States, 435 U.S. 679 (1978)). Further, the Court retained the per se rule against tying contracts but raised the threshold showing of market power that plaintiffs must make to satisfy the rule's requirement of "economic power" (see Jefferson Parish Hospital District No. 2 v. Hyde, 466 U.S. 2 (1985).

Several authors have worked on the creation of a "structured rule of reason" so as to avoid the flaw in terms of the legal certainty surrounding a pure rule of reason.

== In EU ==
A rule of reason does not exist in EU competition law (see e.g. T-11/08, T-112/99, T-49/02, T-491/07, T-208/13, etc.).

It does, however, exist in the EU's substantive law, as developed in the European Court of Justice's Cassis de Dijon-ruling.

== See also ==
- Economy of the United States
- United States government
- US history

== Bibliography ==
- William Howard Taft, The Antitrust Acts and the Supreme Court (1914)
- Robert H. Bork, The Rule of Reason and the Per Se Concept: Price Fixing and Market Division, 74 Yale L. J. 775 (1965) (Part I)
- Rudolph Peritz, "Competition Policy in America, 1888–1992" (1996)
- Albert H. Walker, "The Unreasonable Obiter Dicta of Chief Justice White in the Standard Oil Case: A Critical Review" (1911)
- Alan Meese, "Price Theory, Competition, and the Rule of Reason", 2003 Illinois L. Rev. 77
- William Page, "Ideological Conflict and the Origins of Antitrust Policy", 66 Tulane L. Rev. 1 (1991)
- William Letwin, Law and Economic Policy in America (1965)
- Martin Sklar, "The Corporate Reconstruction of American Capitalism, 1890–1916" (1988)
- Thomas A. Piraino, "Reconciling the Per Se and Rule of Reason Approaches to Antitrust Analysis", 64 S. CAL. L. REV. 685 (1991)
- Frank H. Easterbrook, "The Limits of Antitrust", 63 Texas L. Rev. 1 (1984).
- Steiner J, Woods L, EU Law 10th ed., Oxford: Oxford University Press (2009)
- Thibault Schrepel, "A New Structured Rule of Reason Approach for High-Tech Markets", Suffolk University Law Review, Vol. 50, No. 1, 2017
