= Adams Express Co. v. Ohio State Auditor =

- Supreme Court of the United States

Decided March 15, 1897
- Full case name: Adams Express Co. v. Ohio State Auditor
- Citations: 166 U.S. 185 (more)

Holding
- State taxes on the intangible property of corporations are constitutional, including "all corporate franchises and contracts, privileges, and goodwill of the concern".

Court membership
- Chief Justice Melville Fuller Associate Justices Stephen J. Field · John M. Harlan; Horace Gray · David J. Brewer; Henry B. Brown · George Shiras Jr. Edward D. White · Rufus W. Peckham

Case opinion
- Majority: Brewer, joined by unanimous

Adams Express Co. v. Ohio State Auditor, 166 U.S. 185 (1897), was a United States Supreme Court case in which the Court held State taxes on the intangible property of corporations are constitutional, including "all corporate franchises and contracts, privileges, and goodwill of the concern."
