= American Publishing Co. v. Fisher =

- Supreme Court of the United States

Decided April 12, 1897
- Full case name: American Publishing Company v. Fisher
- Citations: 166 U.S. 464 (more)

Holding
- The Utah Territory's failure to require unanimity in their civil juries violated the Seventh Amendment and the territory's organic act.

Court membership
- Chief Justice Melville Fuller Associate Justices Stephen J. Field · John M. Harlan; Horace Gray · David J. Brewer; Henry B. Brown · George Shiras Jr. Edward D. White · Rufus W. Peckham

Case opinion
- Majority: Brewer, joined by unanimous

American Publishing Co. v. Fisher, 166 U.S. 464 (1897), was a United States Supreme Court case in which the Court held that the Utah Territory's failure to require unanimity in their civil juries violated the Seventh Amendment and the territory's organic act.

== Significance ==
To establish that the Seventh Amendment required unanimous civil juries, this case declared that "...unanimity was one of the peculiar and essential features of trial by jury at the common law. No authorities are needed to sustain this proposition."
