= Tritent International Corp. v. Kentucky =

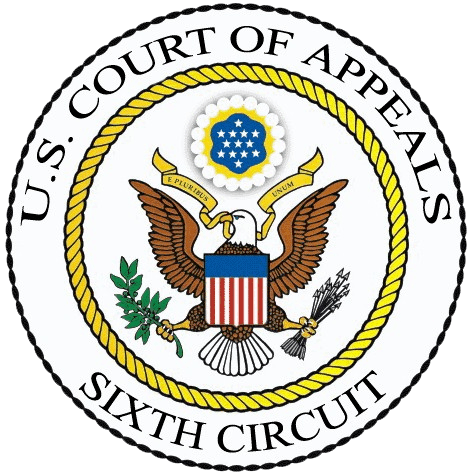
- Court: United States Court of Appeals for the Sixth Circuit
- Full case name: Tritent International Corp. v. Kentucky
- Argued: September 20, 2006
- Decided: October 30, 2006
- Citation: 467 F.3d 547 (6th Cir. 2006)

Court membership
- Judges sitting: Eric L. Clay, Ronald Lee Gilman, William H. Stafford, Jr. (N.D. Fla.)

Case opinions
- Majority: Gilman, joined by Clay, Stafford

Laws applied
- Sherman Act

Tritent International Corp. v. Commonwealth of Kentucky, 467 F.3d 547 (6th Cir. 2006), is a US antitrust law case decided by the Court of Appeals on the Sixth Circuit. The case is notable, inter alia, because it provides a summary of the difficult terms of the Tobacco Master Settlement Agreement.

== Facts ==
In order to give effect to the Tobacco Master Settlement Agreement (MSA), Kentucky enacted an Escrow Statute, Ky. Rev. Stat. Ann. § 131.602, and a Contraband Statute, Ky. Rev. Stat. Ann. § 131.610. Plaintiffs (a Brazilian cigarette manufacturer, an importer, and a Kentucky wholesaler) did not participate in the MSA, and argued that the two statutes collectively authorized anticompetitive behavior. Plaintiffs asserted that the legislation punished nonparticipating manufacturers and rewarded subsequent participating manufacturers—a practice that constituted an illegal per se output cartel. Plaintiffs sought review of an order from the United States District Court for the Eastern District of Kentucky at Frankfort granting defendant Commonwealth of Kentucky's Fed. R. Civ. P. 12(b)(6) motion to dismiss plaintiffs' lawsuit. They alleged that Ky. Rev. Stat. Ann. §§ 131.602, 131.610 were preempted by the SHERMAN Act, 15 U.S.C.S. § 1 et seq.

The Court summarized the facts as follows.

A. Factual background
1. The MSA

In the early-to-mid-1990s, more than 40 states commenced litigation against the tobacco industry, seeking monetary, equitable, and injunctive relief under various consumer-protection and antitrust laws. The general theory of these lawsuits was that the cigarettes produced by the tobacco industry contributed to health problems among the population, which in turn resulted in significant costs to the states' public health systems. In response to the various state lawsuits, the tobacco industry mounted a vigorous defense, denying the states' allegations of wrongdoing. With no end to the litigation in sight, the states and the tobacco industry began collaborating on a settlement agreement.

In 1998, the Attorneys General of 46 states, as well as of the District of Columbia, Puerto Rico, and the Virgin Islands, entered into the MSA with the four largest manufacturers of cigarettes in the United States. These four manufacturers—Philip Morris, RJ Reynolds, Brown & Williamson, and Lorillard—are referred to in the MSA as the Original Participating Manufacturers (OPMs). At the time the MSA became effective, the OPMs collectively controlled approximately 97% of the domestic market for cigarettes.

The purposes of the MSA, from the viewpoint of the settling states, were to prevent youth smoking, to promote public health, and to secure monetary payments from the tobacco manufacturers. In exchange for the OPMs' cooperation in achieving these purposes, the settling states agreed to drop any pending claims against the tobacco industry and to refrain from filing additional claims. The OPMs, as discussed in detail below, agreed in turn to implement various tobacco-related health measures and to make payments to the settling states in perpetuity. In the MSA, the OPMs agreed to pay a minimum of $206 billion over the first twenty-five years of the agreement.

Since 1998, approximately 41 additional tobacco companies have joined the MSA. These companies, referred to as the Subsequent Participating Manufacturers (SPMs), are bound by the MSA's restrictions and must make payments to the settling states as set forth in the MSA. Collectively, the OPMs and the SPMs are referred to as the Participating Manufacturers (PMs). Any tobacco company choosing not to participate in the MSA is referred to as a Nonparticipating Manufacturer (NPM).

The amount of money that the PMs are required to annually contribute to the states varies according to several factors. All payments are based primarily on the number of cigarettes sold. For the OPMs, the payments are determined in accordance with their relative market share as of 1997. The payment amount of a particular OPM is also dictated by the "Volume Adjustment," which compares the number of cigarettes sold in each payment year to the number of cigarettes sold in 1997. If the number of cigarettes sold by an OPM in a given year is less than the number it sold in 1997, the Volume Adjustment allows that OPM to reduce its payment to the settling states. In other words, a reduction in the amount of cigarettes sold by the OPMs results in the settling states receiving less money.

The annual payments of the SPMs are determined by their relative market share as compared to other SPMs. For the SPMs that joined the MSA within 90 days of its execution, the annual payments are determined by the number of cigarettes an SPM sells beyond the "grandfathered" volume—calculated as the higher of either the individual SPM's market share in 1998 (the year the MSA was executed) or 125% of the SPM's market share in 1997. If an SPM's sales volume or market share declines below the grandfathered amount, then it is not required to make any payments to the [**6] settling states. SPMs that failed to join the MSA within 90 days of its execution do not receive the benefit of any grandfathered amount.

The payments from the PMs are deposited into an escrow account until disbursement to the settling states. Each state receives a payment equal to its "Allocable Share," a percentage of the funds held in escrow that has been agreed upon by the settling states and memorialized in the MSA. This "Allocable Share" (as measured by a percentage of the total funds in escrow) does not vary according to how many cigarettes are sold in a particular state in a given year.

During the drafting of the MSA, the OPMs and the settling states contemplated that many of the smaller tobacco companies would choose not to join the MSA. This failure to join posed a potential problem for both the OPMs and the settling states. The OPMs worried that the NPMs, both because they would not be bound by the advertising and other restrictions in the MSA and because they would not be required to make payments to the settling states, would be able to charge lower prices for their cigarettes and thus increase their market share.

Although the settling states' motivation was different from that of the OPMs, these states also were concerned about the effect of the tobacco companies that refused to join the MSA. The settling states worried that the NPMs would be able to regulate their sales so as to stay afloat financially while at the same time being effectively judgment-proof. As a result of these twin concerns, the OPMs and the settling states sought to have the MSA provide these other tobacco companies with incentives to join the agreement.

One such incentive, called the NPM Adjustment, provides that the payments by the PMs to the settling states may be adjusted according to the "NPM Adjustment Percentage." According to this provision, if a nationally recognized firm of economic consultants determines that the PMs have lost market share as a result of compliance with the MSA, the PMs' required payments to the settling states will be reduced to account for the loss. The NPM Adjustment therefore gives the settling states an incentive to protect the market dominance of the PMs, because otherwise the settling states themselves will receive less funds.

In addition to the NPM Adjustment, the MSA contains other provisions to protect the PMs. Primary among these provisions is a requirement that the settling states adopt "complementary" legislation to effectuate the MSA, with a failure to do so resulting in substantial reductions in the yearly payments. This complementary legislation, enacted by Kentucky and the other settling states, is the subject of the present case.

== Judgment ==
The court held that the legislation was not subject to SHERMAN Act preemption because plaintiffs failed to establish that the legislation mandated or authorized illegal behavior in all cases. The fact that the volume-based payment scale in the MSA and in Ky. Rev. Stat. Ann. § 131.602(2)(b) (2004) influenced the participating manufacturers to raise their prices and lower their output was not enough to satisfy the first prong of the Rice preemption analysis. The court also concluded that plaintiffs' failure to show preemption precluded consideration of their hybrid-restraint claim.

== See also ==
- US antitrust law
