= List of United States Supreme Court cases, volume 193 =

Supreme Court of the United States
- Interactive map of Supreme Court of the United States
- 38°53′26″N 77°00′16″W
- Established: March 4, 1789; 237 years ago
- Location: Washington, D.C.
- Coordinates: 38°53′26″N 77°00′16″W
- Composition method: Presidential nomination with Senate confirmation
- Authorised by: Constitution of the United States, Art. III, § 1
- Judge term length: life tenure, subject to impeachment and removal
- Number of positions: 9 (by statute)
- Website: supremecourt.gov

This is a list of cases reported in volume 193 of United States Reports, decided by the Supreme Court of the United States in 1904.

== Justices of the Supreme Court at the time of volume 193 U.S. ==
The Supreme Court is established by Article III, Section 1 of the Constitution of the United States, which says: "The judicial Power of the United States, shall be vested in one supreme Court . . .". The size of the Court is not specified; the Constitution leaves it to Congress to set the number of justices. Under the Judiciary Act of 1789 Congress originally fixed the number of justices at six (one chief justice and five associate justices). Since 1789 Congress has varied the size of the Court from six to seven, nine, ten, and back to nine justices (always including one chief justice).

When the cases in volume 193 were decided the Court comprised the following nine members:

Portrait	Justice	Office	Home State	Succeeded	Date confirmed by the Senate (Vote)	Tenure on Supreme Court
	Melville Fuller	Chief Justice	Illinois	Morrison Waite	July 20, 1888 (41–20)	October 8, 1888 – July 4, 1910 (Died)
	John Marshall Harlan	Associate Justice	Kentucky	David Davis	November 29, 1877 (Acclamation)	December 10, 1877 – October 14, 1911 (Died)
	David Josiah Brewer	Associate Justice	Kansas	Stanley Matthews	December 18, 1889 (53–11)	January 6, 1890 – March 28, 1910 (Died)
	Henry Billings Brown	Associate Justice	Michigan	Samuel Freeman Miller	December 29, 1890 (Acclamation)	January 5, 1891 – May 28, 1906 (Retired)
	Edward Douglass White	Associate Justice	Louisiana	Samuel Blatchford	February 19, 1894 (Acclamation)	March 12, 1894 – December 18, 1910 (Continued as chief justice)
	Rufus W. Peckham	Associate Justice	New York	Howell Edmunds Jackson	December 9, 1895 (Acclamation)	January 6, 1896 – October 24, 1909 (Died)
	Joseph McKenna	Associate Justice	California	Stephen Johnson Field	January 21, 1898 (Acclamation)	January 26, 1898 – January 5, 1925 (Retired)
	Oliver Wendell Holmes Jr.	Associate Justice	Massachusetts	Horace Gray	December 4, 1902 (Acclamation)	December 8, 1902 – January 12, 1932 (Retired)
	William R. Day	Associate Justice	Ohio	George Shiras Jr.	February 23, 1903 (Acclamation)	March 2, 1903 – November 13, 1922 (Retired)

== Notable Case in 193 U.S. ==
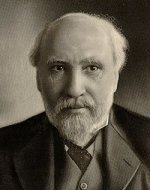
Railroad czar James J. Hill, c. 1890

=== Northern Securities Company v. United States ===
Northern Securities Company v. United States, 193 U.S. 197 (1904), is a landmark antitrust decision of the Supreme Court. The Court ruled 5 to 4 against the stockholders of the Great Northern and Northern Pacific railroad companies, who had formed a monopoly under the Northern Securities Company. The public had become greatly alarmed by Northern Securities, which threatened to become the largest company in the world and to corner the railroad traffic in the western United States. The Court's decision was a blow to monopolist James J. Hill, who had helped engineer the formation of Northern Securities, and was a victory for President Theodore Roosevelt's trust-busting activities under the Sherman Antitrust Act. The dissenting opinion of Justice Oliver Wendell Holmes Jr. included the famous passage: "Great cases like hard cases make bad law. For great cases are called great, not by reason of their real importance in shaping the law of the future, but because of some accident of immediate overwhelming interest which appeals to the feelings and distorts the judgment."

== Citation style ==
Under the Judiciary Act of 1789 the federal court structure at the time comprised District Courts, which had general trial jurisdiction; Circuit Courts, which had mixed trial and appellate (from the US District Courts) jurisdiction; and the United States Supreme Court, which had appellate jurisdiction over the federal District and Circuit courts—and for certain issues over state courts. The Supreme Court also had limited original jurisdiction (i.e., in which cases could be filed directly with the Supreme Court without first having been heard by a lower federal or state court). There were one or more federal District Courts and/or Circuit Courts in each state, territory, or other geographical region.

The Judiciary Act of 1891 created the United States Courts of Appeals and reassigned the jurisdiction of most routine appeals from the district and circuit courts to these appellate courts. The Act created nine new courts that were originally known as the "United States Circuit Courts of Appeals." The new courts had jurisdiction over most appeals of lower court decisions. The Supreme Court could review either legal issues that a court of appeals certified or decisions of court of appeals by writ of certiorari.

Bluebook citation style is used for case names, citations, and jurisdictions.

- "# Cir." = United States Court of Appeals
  - e.g., "3d Cir." = United States Court of Appeals for the Third Circuit
- "C.C.D." = United States Circuit Court for the District of . . .
  - e.g.,"C.C.D.N.J." = United States Circuit Court for the District of New Jersey
- "D." = United States District Court for the District of . . .
  - e.g.,"D. Mass." = United States District Court for the District of Massachusetts
- "E." = Eastern; "M." = Middle; "N." = Northern; "S." = Southern; "W." = Western
  - e.g.,"C.C.S.D.N.Y." = United States Circuit Court for the Southern District of New York
  - e.g.,"M.D. Ala." = United States District Court for the Middle District of Alabama
- "Ct. Cl." = United States Court of Claims
- The abbreviation of a state's name alone indicates the highest appellate court in that state's judiciary at the time.
  - e.g.,"Pa." = Supreme Court of Pennsylvania
  - e.g.,"Me." = Supreme Judicial Court of Maine

== List of cases in volume 193 U.S. ==
Case Name	Page and year	Opinion of the Court	Concurring opinion(s)	Dissenting opinion(s)	Lower Court	Disposition
United States v. Northern Pacific Railroad Company	1 (1904)	Fuller	none	none	9th Cir.	affirmed
Carstairs v. Cochran	10 (1904)	Brewer	none	none	Md.	affirmed
Grand Rapids and Indiana Railroad Company v. Osborn	17 (1904)	White	none	none	Mich.	affirmed
Cincinnati Street Railway Company v. Snell	30 (1904)	White	none	none	Ohio	affirmed
Montague Company v. Lowry	38 (1904)	Peckham	none	none	9th Cir.	affirmed
American Book Company v. Kansas ex rel. Nichols	49 (1904)	McKenna	none	none	Kan.	dismissed
Minneapolis and St. Louis Railway Company v. Minnesota	53 (1904)	McKenna	none	none	Minn.	affirmed
Ah How v. United States	65 (1904)	Holmes	none	none	E.D.N.Y.	affirmed
Leigh v. Green	79 (1904)	Day	none	none	Neb.	affirmed
Julian v. Central Trust Company	93 (1904)	Day	none	none	4th Cir.	affirmed
United States v. Choctaw Nation	115 (1904)	McKenna	none	none	Ct. Cl.	affirmed
Delaware Indians v. Cherokee Nation	127 (1904)	Day	none	none	Ct. Cl.	affirmed
Giles v. Teasley	146 (1904)	Day	none	none	Ala.	dismissed
Security Land Exploration Company v. Burns	167 (1904)	Peckham	none	none	Minn.	affirmed
Security Land Exploration Company v. Weckey	188 (1904)	Peckham	none	none	Minn.	affirmed
Winous Point Shooting Club v. Caspersen	189 (1904)	Fuller	none	none	Ohio	dismissed
Hodges v. Colcord	192 (1904)	Brewer	none	none	Sup. Ct. Terr. Okla.	affirmed
Northern Securities Company v. United States	197 (1904)	Harlan (plurality)	Brewer	White; Holmes	C.C.D. Minn.	affirmed
Eaton v. Brown	411 (1904)	Holmes	none	none	D.C. Cir.	reversed
Underground Railroad v. City of New York	416 (1904)	Fuller	none	none	C.C.S.D.N.Y.	affirmed
Barney v. City of New York	430 (1904)	Fuller	none	none	C.C.S.D.N.Y.	affirmed
Huntington v. City of New York	441 (1904)	Fuller	none	none	C.C.S.D.N.Y.	affirmed
Boering v. Chesapeake Beach Railway Company	442 (1904)	Brewer	none	none	D.C. Cir.	affirmed
Gagnon v. United States	451 (1904)	Brown	none	none	Ct. Cl.	affirmed
Tinker v. Colwell	473 (1904)	Peckham	none	none	N.Y. Sup. Ct.	affirmed
Fargo v. Hart	490 (1904)	Holmes	none	none	C.C.D. Ind.	reversed
Rippey v. Texas	504 (1904)	Holmes	none	none	Tex. Crim. App.	affirmed
Adams v. Church	510 (1904)	Day	none	none	Or. Cir. Ct.	affirmed
Tom Hong v. United States	517 (1904)	Day	none	none	E.D.N.Y.	reversed
Bache v. Hunt	523 (1904)	Fuller	none	none	C.C.N.D. Ohio	dismissed
Yaple v. Dahl-Millikan Grocery Company	526 (1904)	Fuller	none	none	6th Cir.	certification
United States v. Jones	528 (1904)	Fuller	none	none	Ct. Cl.	affirmed
Great Southern Fire Proof Hotel Company v. Jones	532 (1904)	Harlan	none	none	6th Cir.	affirmed
Mutual Life Insurance Company v. Hill	551 (1904)	Brewer	none	none	9th Cir.	reversed
Newburyport Water Company v. City of Newburyport	561 (1904)	White	none	none	C.C.D. Mass.	reversed
Gloucester Water Supply Company v. City of Gloucester	580 (1904)	White	none	none	C.C.D. Mass.	reversed
Third National Bank v. Buffalo German Insurance Company	581 (1904)	White	none	none	N.Y.	affirmed
United States v. McCoy	593 (1904)	White	none	none	9th Cir.	reversed
Platt v. Wilmot	602 (1904)	Peckham	none	none	2d Cir.	affirmed
Sloan v. United States	614 (1904)	Peckham	none	none	C.C.D. Neb.	dismissed
Pope v. Williams	621 (1904)	Peckham	none	none	Md.	affirmed
National Mutual Building and Loan Association v. Brahan	635 (1904)	McKenna	none	none	Miss.	affirmed
United States v. Commonwealth Land Title Insurance Company Company	651 (1904)	McKenna	none	none	Ct. Cl.	affirmed
Wright v. Minnesota Mutual Life Insurance Company	657 (1904)	Day	none	none	C.C.D. Minn.	affirmed

== See also ==
- Certificate of division
