= List of United States Supreme Court cases, volume 166 =

Supreme Court of the United States
- Interactive map of Supreme Court of the United States
- 38°53′26″N 77°00′16″W
- Established: March 4, 1789; 236 years ago
- Location: Washington, D.C.
- Coordinates: 38°53′26″N 77°00′16″W
- Composition method: Presidential nomination with Senate confirmation
- Authorised by: Constitution of the United States, Art. III, § 1
- Judge term length: life tenure, subject to impeachment and removal
- Number of positions: 9 (by statute)
- Website: supremecourt.gov

This is a list of cases reported in volume 166 of United States Reports, decided by the Supreme Court of the United States in 1897.

== Justices of the Supreme Court at the time of volume 166 U.S. ==
The Supreme Court is established by Article III, Section 1 of the Constitution of the United States, which says: "The judicial Power of the United States, shall be vested in one supreme Court . . .". The size of the Court is not specified; the Constitution leaves it to Congress to set the number of justices. Under the Judiciary Act of 1789 Congress originally fixed the number of justices at six (one chief justice and five associate justices). Since 1789 Congress has varied the size of the Court from six to seven, nine, ten, and back to nine justices (always including one chief justice).

When the cases in volume 166 were decided the Court comprised the following nine members:

Portrait	Justice	Office	Home State	Succeeded	Date confirmed by the Senate (Vote)	Tenure on Supreme Court
	Melville Fuller	Chief Justice	Illinois	Morrison Waite	July 20, 1888 (41–20)	October 8, 1888 – July 4, 1910 (Died)
	Stephen Johnson Field	Associate Justice	California	newly created seat	March 10, 1863 (Acclamation)	May 10, 1863 – December 1, 1897 (Retired)
	John Marshall Harlan	Associate Justice	Kentucky	David Davis	November 29, 1877 (Acclamation)	December 10, 1877 – October 14, 1911 (Died)
	Horace Gray	Associate Justice	Massachusetts	Nathan Clifford	December 20, 1881 (51–5)	January 9, 1882 – September 15, 1902 (Died)
	David Josiah Brewer	Associate Justice	Kansas	Stanley Matthews	December 18, 1889 (53–11)	January 6, 1890 – March 28, 1910 (Died)
	Henry Billings Brown	Associate Justice	Michigan	Samuel Freeman Miller	December 29, 1890 (Acclamation)	January 5, 1891 – May 28, 1906 (Retired)
	George Shiras Jr.	Associate Justice	Pennsylvania	Joseph P. Bradley	July 26, 1892 (Acclamation)	October 10, 1892 – February 23, 1903 (Retired)
	Edward Douglass White	Associate Justice	Louisiana	Samuel Blatchford	February 19, 1894 (Acclamation)	March 12, 1894 – December 18, 1910 (Continued as chief justice)
	Rufus W. Peckham	Associate Justice	New York	Howell Edmunds Jackson	December 9, 1895 (Acclamation)	January 6, 1896 – October 24, 1909 (Died)

== Notable Case in 166 U.S. ==
=== United States v. Trans-Missouri Freight Ass'n ===
In United States v. Trans-Missouri Freight Ass'n, 166 U.S. 290 (1897), the Supreme Court held that the Sherman Act (which was an antitrust measure prohibiting anti-competitive behavior in commerce) applied to the railroad industry, even though the U.S. Congress had already enacted a comprehensive regime of regulations for that industry.

== Citation style ==
Under the Judiciary Act of 1789 the federal court structure at the time comprised District Courts, which had general trial jurisdiction; Circuit Courts, which had mixed trial and appellate (from the US District Courts) jurisdiction; and the United States Supreme Court, which had appellate jurisdiction over the federal District and Circuit courts—and for certain issues over state courts. The Supreme Court also had limited original jurisdiction (i.e., in which cases could be filed directly with the Supreme Court without first having been heard by a lower federal or state court). There were one or more federal District Courts and/or Circuit Courts in each state, territory, or other geographical region.

The Judiciary Act of 1891 created the United States Courts of Appeals and reassigned the jurisdiction of most routine appeals from the district and circuit courts to these appellate courts. The Act created nine new courts that were originally known as the "United States Circuit Courts of Appeals." The new courts had jurisdiction over most appeals of lower court decisions. The Supreme Court could review either legal issues that a court of appeals certified or decisions of court of appeals by writ of certiorari.

Bluebook citation style is used for case names, citations, and jurisdictions.

- "# Cir." = United States Court of Appeals
  - e.g., "3d Cir." = United States Court of Appeals for the Third Circuit
- "C.C.D." = United States Circuit Court for the District of . . .
  - e.g.,"C.C.D.N.J." = United States Circuit Court for the District of New Jersey
- "D." = United States District Court for the District of . . .
  - e.g.,"D. Mass." = United States District Court for the District of Massachusetts
- "E." = Eastern; "M." = Middle; "N." = Northern; "S." = Southern; "W." = Western
  - e.g.,"C.C.S.D.N.Y." = United States Circuit Court for the Southern District of New York
  - e.g.,"M.D. Ala." = United States District Court for the Middle District of Alabama
- "Ct. Cl." = United States Court of Claims
- The abbreviation of a state's name alone indicates the highest appellate court in that state's judiciary at the time.
  - e.g.,"Pa." = Supreme Court of Pennsylvania
  - e.g.,"Me." = Supreme Judicial Court of Maine

== List of cases in volume 166 U.S. ==
Case Name	Page and year	Opinion of the Court	Concurring opinion(s)	Dissenting opinion(s)	Lower Court	Disposition
The Three Friends	1 (1897)	Fuller	none	Harlan	5th Cir.	reversed
Barber v. Pittsburgh, Fort Wayne and Chicago Railway Company	83 (1897)	Gray	none	none	3d Cir.	certification
The Conqueror	110 (1897)	Brown	none	none	2d Cir.	reversed
In re Alix	136 (1897)	Fuller	none	none	D.N.J.	prohibition denied
Allen v. Georgia	138 (1897)	Brown	none	none	Ga.	affirmed
Masons v. City of New Orleans	143 (1897)	Brown	none	none	La.	affirmed
Henderson Bridge Company v. Kentucky	150 (1897)	Fuller	none	White	Ky.	affirmed
Adams Express Co. v. Kentucky	171 (1897)	Fuller	none	White	C.C.D. Ky.	affirmed
Adams Express Co. v. Ohio State Auditor	185 (1897)	Brewer	none	none	6th Cir.	rehearing denied
Chicago, Burlington and Quincy Railroad Company v. City of Chicago I	226 (1897)	Harlan	none	none	Ill.	affirmed
Chicago, Burlington and Quincy Railroad Company v. City of Chicago II	258 (1897)	Harlan	none	none	Ill.	affirmed
In re Potts	263 (1897)	Gray	none	none	C.C.S.D. Ohio	mandamus granted
Gibson v. United States	269 (1897)	Fuller	none	none	Ct. Cl.	affirmed
Nelson v. Flint	276 (1897)	Brewer	none	none	Sup. Ct. Terr. Utah	affirmed
Panama Railroad Company v. Napier Shipping Company	280 (1897)	Brown	none	none	2d Cir.	affirmed
United States v. Trans-Missouri Freight Association	290 (1897)	Peckham	none	White	8th Cir.	reversed
The Majestic	375 (1897)	Fuller	none	none	2d Cir.	reversed
City of St. Louis v. Western Union Telegraph Company	388 (1897)	Shiras	none	none	C.C.E.D. Mo.	affirmed
Iasigi v. Van de Carr	391 (1897)	Fuller	none	none	S.D.N.Y.	affirmed
Hooe v. Jamieson	395 (1897)	Fuller	none	none	C.C.W.D. Wis.	affirmed
Hooe v. Werner	399 (1897)	Fuller	none	none	C.C.W.D. Wis.	affirmed
Martin v. Atchison, Topeka and Santa Fe Railway Company	399 (1897)	Peckham	none	none	Sup. Ct. Terr. N.M.	affirmed
The Umbria	404 (1897)	Brown	none	none	2d Cir.	reversed
Hunt v. United States	424 (1897)	Gray	none	none	8th Cir.	dismissed
Gladson v. Minnesota	427 (1897)	Gray	none	none	Minn.	affirmed
In re Hien	432 (1897)	Fuller	none	none	D.C. Cir.	mandamus denied
Aberdeen Bank v. Chehalis County	440 (1897)	Shiras	none	Harlan	Wash.	affirmed
National Bank of Commerce v. City of Seattle	463 (1897)	Shiras	none	none	Wash.	affirmed
American Publishing Company v. Fisher	464 (1897)	Brewer	none	none	Sup. Ct. Terr. Utah	reversed
United States v. American Tobacco Company	468 (1897)	Peckham	none	none	Ct. Cl.	affirmed
In re Eckart	481 (1897)	White	none	none	Wis.	habeas corpus denied
Zadig v. Baldwin	485 (1897)	White	none	none	Cal.	dismissed
Electric Company v. Dow	489 (1897)	Shiras	none	none	N.H.	dismissed
Carter v. Ruddy	493 (1897)	Brewer	none	none	9th Cir.	affirmed
Allen v. Culp	501 (1897)	Brown	none	none	Philadelphia County Ct. Com. Pl.	affirmed
Forsyth v. City of Hammond	506 (1897)	Brewer	none	none	7th Cir.	reversed
Washington and Georgetown Railroad Company v. Hickey	521 (1897)	Peckham	none	none	D.C. Cir.	affirmed
Manson v. Duncanson	533 (1897)	Shiras	none	none	D.C. Cir.	affirmed
Ex parte Lennon	548 (1897)	Brown	none	none	6th Cir.	affirmed
City Railway Company v. Citizens' Street Railroad Company	557 (1897)	Brown	none	none	C.C.D. Ind.	affirmed
Moses v. United States	571 (1897)	Peckham	none	none	D.C. Cir.	affirmed
United States v. Greathouse	601 (1897)	Harlan	none	none	Ct. Cl.	affirmed
Texas and Pacific Railway Company v. Cody	606 (1897)	Fuller	none	none	5th Cir.	affirmed
Texas and Pacific Railway Company v. Barrett	617 (1897)	Fuller	none	none	5th Cir.	affirmed
Northern Pacific Railroad Company v. Sanders	620 (1897)	Harlan	none	none	9th Cir.	affirmed
Whitney v. Fox	637 (1897)	Harlan	none	none	Sup. Ct. Terr. Utah	affirmed
Oxley Stave Company v. Butler County	648 (1897)	Harlan	none	none	Mo.	dismissed
In re Chapman	661 (1897)	Fuller	none	none	Sup. Ct. D.C.	dismissed
City of Baltimore v. Baltimore Trust and Guarantee Company	673 (1897)	Peckham	none	none	C.C.D. Md.	reversed
Long Island Water Supply Company v. City of Brooklyn	685 (1897)	Brewer	none	none	N.Y. Sup. Ct.	affirmed
Sentell v. New Orleans and Carrollton Railroad Company	698 (1897)	Brown	none	none	La. Ct. App.	affirmed
City of Springville v. Thomas	707 (1897)	Fuller	none	none	Sup. Ct. Terr. Utah	reversed
Louisville and Nashville Railroad Company v. City of Louisville	709 (1897)	Fuller	none	none	Ky.	dismissed

== See also ==
- Certificate of division
