= Northern Securities Co. v. United States =

Northern Securities Company v. United States
- Supreme Court of the United States

Argued December 14–15, 1903 Decided March 14, 1904
- Full case name: Northern Securities Company, et al., Apts. v. United States
- Citations: 193 U.S. 197 (more) 24 S. Ct. 436; 48 L. Ed. 679

Court membership
- Chief Justice Melville Fuller Associate Justices John M. Harlan · David J. Brewer; Henry B. Brown · Edward D. White; Rufus W. Peckham · Joseph McKenna; Oliver W. Holmes Jr. · William R. Day

Case opinions
- Plurality: Harlan, joined by Brown, McKenna, Day
- Concurrence: Brewer (in judgment)
- Dissent: White, joined by Fuller, Peckham, Holmes
- Dissent: Holmes, joined by Fuller, White, Peckham

Laws applied
- Sherman Antitrust Act

Northern Securities Co. v. United States, 193 U.S. 197 (1904), was a case heard by the U.S. Supreme Court in December 1903. The Court ruled 5-4 against the stockholders of the Great Northern and Northern Pacific railroad companies, holding that their merger was effectively a monopoly falling within the prohibitions of the Sherman Antitrust Act, and to dissolve the Northern Securities Company.

== Background ==
In 1901, James Jerome Hill, president of and the largest stockholder in the Great Northern Railway, won the financial support of J. P. Morgan and attempted to take over the Chicago, Burlington and Quincy Railroad (CB&Q). The CB&Q served a traffic-rich region of the Midwest and Great Plains, was well-managed, and quite profitable. It possessed a finely-engineered line connecting the Twin Cities to the nation's rail center of Chicago, which made it particularly attractive as an addition to Hill's Great Northern.

Hill's strategy was for his railroad and Morgan's Northern Pacific Railway to jointly buy the CB&Q. However, Edward Henry Harriman, president of the Union Pacific Railroad and the Southern Pacific Railroad, also wanted to buy the CB&Q. Harriman demanded a one-third interest in the CB&Q, but Hill refused him. Harriman then began to buy up Northern Pacific's stock, forcing Hill and Morgan to counter by purchasing more stock as well. Northern Pacific's stock price skyrocketed, and the artificially high stock threatened to cause a crash on the New York Stock Exchange.

Hill and Morgan, ultimately successful in obtaining more Northern Pacific stock than Harriman, gained control of not only the Northern Pacific but also the CB&Q.

Pressured by Harriman's actions, Hill created a holding company—the Northern Securities Company—to control all three of the railroads. The public was greatly alarmed by the formation of Northern Securities, which threatened to become the largest company in the world and monopolize railroad traffic in the western United States. President William McKinley, however, was not willing to pursue antitrust litigation against Hill. McKinley was assassinated, however, and his progressive Vice-President, Theodore Roosevelt, ordered the United States Department of Justice to pursue a case against Northern Securities. The case was led by Assistant Attorney General Milton D. Purdy.

== Judgment ==
Justice Harlan held that the merger was unlawful. Justices Day, Brown, McKenna and Brewer concurred.

Justice Holmes, joined by Fuller, White, Peckham, dissented. The Holmes dissent included the famous passage: "Great cases like hard cases make bad law. For great cases are called great, not by reason of their real importance in shaping the law of the future, but because of some accident of immediate overwhelming interest which appeals to the feelings and distorts the judgment."

== Significance ==
Hill was forced to disband his holding company and manage each railroad independently. The Northern Pacific; the Great Northern; and the Chicago, Burlington and Quincy companies would later merge in 1969. The case was an example of Roosevelt's trust-busting procedures, prosecuting under the Sherman Antitrust Act (1890), and it marked a major victory for the antitrust movement.
