= Continental Television, Inc. v. GTE Sylvania, Inc. =

Continental Television v. GTE Sylvania
- Supreme Court of the United States

Argued February 28, 1977 Decided June 23, 1977
- Full case name: Continental Television, Inc., et al. v. GTE Sylvania Inc.
- Citations: 433 U.S. 36 (more) 97 S. Ct. 2549; 53 L. Ed. 2d 568; 1977 U.S. LEXIS 134; 1977-1 Trade Cas. (CCH) ¶ 61,488

Court membership
- Chief Justice Warren E. Burger Associate Justices William J. Brennan Jr. · Potter Stewart; Byron White · Thurgood Marshall; Harry Blackmun · Lewis F. Powell Jr. William Rehnquist · John P. Stevens

Case opinions
- Majority: Powell, joined by Burger, Stewart, Blackmun, Stevens
- Concurrence: White
- Dissent: Brennan, joined by Marshall
- Rehnquist took no part in the consideration or decision of the case.

Continental Television v. GTE Sylvania, 433 U.S. 36 (1977), was an antitrust decision of the Supreme Court of the United States. It overturned United States v. Arnold, Schwinn & Co., 388 U.S. 365 (1967), which held that vertical restraints on the territory a product could be sold in were per se illegal. Here, the Court clarified that such non-price vertical restraints would be analyzed under the "rule of reason," allowing defendants to offer justifications for the restraint.

== Facts ==
Facing declining sales, GTE-Sylvania attempted to reduce the number of competing Sylvania retailers by "limit[ing] the number of franchises granted for any given area [of the country] and requir[ing] each franchisee to sell his Sylvania products only from the location or locations at which he was franchised." 433 U.S., at 38. When Continental was denied such a franchise, they filed a lawsuit alleging violation of the Sherman Act.

GTE Sylvania's actions appeared to be illegal per se under the rule established in United States v. Arnold, Schwinn & Co., 388 U.S. 365 (1967), where the Court similarly considered a territorial restriction on the sale of a product.

== Judgment ==
The Supreme Court overruled Schwinn (which had itself been a change in course from White Motor Co. v. United States, 372 U.S. 253 (1963), where the court had refused to adopt such a rule, 433 U.S., at 47) and held that such business practices must be analyzed under the rule of reason. Noting that "per se rules of illegality are appropriate only when they relate to conduct that is manifestly anticompetitive," 433 U.S., at 49–50, the court concluded that GTE's behavior transgressed the Sherman Act only if it was an unreasonable restraint of trade that would diminish competition and promote inefficiency.

== Significance ==
The Sylvania case became the first shot in the court's march to the "Chicago School" version of antitrust economics as the touchstone of antitrust law. Attributed to the influence of Robert Bork, summarized in The Antitrust Paradox, and Richard Posner, explained in Antitrust Law (both published in 1978), these legal scholars popularized what Chicago economists had produced.

The initial ground was broken by economist George McGee, who reanalyzed the biggest antitrust ruling in history, the Supreme Court's split up of Standard Oil in 1911. McGee disputed Standard Oil's engagement in predatory pricing, the linchpin of its antitrust violations. McGee's view is now widely criticized, by lawyers Christopher Leslie, Elizabeth Granitz, Benjamin Klein, economists James Dalton, Louis Esposito, and historians Ron Chernow, Daniel Yergin. Bork and Posner wrote books that advised attorneys and courts that McGee's paper showed antitrust's foundation was uncertain. Other Chicago economists who influenced antitrust debates in ways that narrowed and limited its legal basis include Ronald Coase, Gary Becker, and George Stigler.

McGee was inspired to rethink antitrust law by his University of Chicago economics co-professor Aaron Director in the 1950s, according to Posner. Director was Milton Friedman's brother-in-law, and shared his agenda to move mainstream economics away from Keynesian macroeconomics and towards laissez-faire.

The case staked out the ground for cases like Broadcast Music v. Columbia Broadcasting System, State Oil Co. v. Khan, Verizon v. Trinko, and Leegin v. PSKS.
