= List of United States Supreme Court cases, volume 246 =

Supreme Court of the United States
- Interactive map of Supreme Court of the United States
- 38°53′26″N 77°00′16″W
- Established: March 4, 1789; 236 years ago
- Location: Washington, D.C.
- Coordinates: 38°53′26″N 77°00′16″W
- Composition method: Presidential nomination with Senate confirmation
- Authorised by: Constitution of the United States, Art. III, § 1
- Judge term length: life tenure, subject to impeachment and removal
- Number of positions: 9 (by statute)
- Website: supremecourt.gov

This is a list of cases reported in volume 246 of United States Reports, decided by the Supreme Court of the United States in 1918.

== Justices of the Supreme Court at the time of volume 246 U.S. ==
The Supreme Court is established by Article III, Section 1 of the Constitution of the United States, which says: "The judicial Power of the United States, shall be vested in one supreme Court . . .". The size of the Court is not specified; the Constitution leaves it to Congress to set the number of justices. Under the Judiciary Act of 1789 Congress originally fixed the number of justices at six (one chief justice and five associate justices). Since 1789 Congress has varied the size of the Court from six to seven, nine, ten, and back to nine justices (always including one chief justice).

When the cases in volume 246 were decided the Court comprised the following nine members:

Portrait	Justice	Office	Home State	Succeeded	Date confirmed by the Senate (Vote)	Tenure on Supreme Court
	Edward Douglass White	Chief Justice	Louisiana	Melville Fuller	December 12, 1910 (Acclamation)	December 19, 1910 – May 19, 1921 (Died)
	Joseph McKenna	Associate Justice	California	Stephen Johnson Field	January 21, 1898 (Acclamation)	January 26, 1898 – January 5, 1925 (Retired)
	Oliver Wendell Holmes Jr.	Associate Justice	Massachusetts	Horace Gray	December 4, 1902 (Acclamation)	December 8, 1902 – January 12, 1932 (Retired)
	William R. Day	Associate Justice	Ohio	George Shiras Jr.	February 23, 1903 (Acclamation)	March 2, 1903 – November 13, 1922 (Retired)
	Willis Van Devanter	Associate Justice	Wyoming	Edward Douglass White (as Associate Justice)	December 15, 1910 (Acclamation)	January 3, 1911 – June 2, 1937 (Retired)
	Mahlon Pitney	Associate Justice	New Jersey	John Marshall Harlan	March 13, 1912 (50–26)	March 18, 1912 – December 31, 1922 (Resigned)
	James Clark McReynolds	Associate Justice	Tennessee	Horace Harmon Lurton	August 29, 1914 (44–6)	October 12, 1914 – January 31, 1941 (Retired)
	Louis Brandeis	Associate Justice	Massachusetts	Joseph Rucker Lamar	June 1, 1916 (47–22)	June 5, 1916 – February 13, 1939 (Retired)
	John Hessin Clarke	Associate Justice	Ohio	Charles Evans Hughes	July 24, 1916 (Acclamation)	October 9, 1916 – September 18, 1922 (Retired)

== Citation style ==
Under the Judiciary Act of 1789 the federal court structure at the time comprised District Courts, which had general trial jurisdiction; Circuit Courts, which had mixed trial and appellate (from the US District Courts) jurisdiction; and the United States Supreme Court, which had appellate jurisdiction over the federal District and Circuit courts—and for certain issues over state courts. The Supreme Court also had limited original jurisdiction (i.e., in which cases could be filed directly with the Supreme Court without first having been heard by a lower federal or state court). There were one or more federal District Courts and/or Circuit Courts in each state, territory, or other geographical region.

The Judiciary Act of 1891 created the United States Courts of Appeals and reassigned the jurisdiction of most routine appeals from the district and circuit courts to these appellate courts. The Act created nine new courts that were originally known as the "United States Circuit Courts of Appeals." The new courts had jurisdiction over most appeals of lower court decisions. The Supreme Court could review either legal issues that a court of appeals certified or decisions of court of appeals by writ of certiorari. On January 1, 1912, the effective date of the Judicial Code of 1911, the old Circuit Courts were abolished, with their remaining trial court jurisdiction transferred to the U.S. District Courts.

Bluebook citation style is used for case names, citations, and jurisdictions.

- "# Cir." = United States Court of Appeals
  - e.g., "3d Cir." = United States Court of Appeals for the Third Circuit
- "D." = United States District Court for the District of . . .
  - e.g.,"D. Mass." = United States District Court for the District of Massachusetts
- "E." = Eastern; "M." = Middle; "N." = Northern; "S." = Southern; "W." = Western
  - e.g.,"M.D. Ala." = United States District Court for the Middle District of Alabama
- "Ct. Cl." = United States Court of Claims
- The abbreviation of a state's name alone indicates the highest appellate court in that state's judiciary at the time.
  - e.g.,"Pa." = Supreme Court of Pennsylvania
  - e.g.,"Me." = Supreme Judicial Court of Maine

== List of cases in volume 246 U.S. ==
Case Name	Page and year	Opinion of the Court	Concurring opinion(s)	Dissenting opinion(s)	Lower Court	Disposition of case
Armour and Company v. Virginia	1 (1918)	White	none	none	Va.	affirmed
Boston Store v. American Graphophone Company	8 (1918)	White	Brandeis	none	7th Cir.	certification
Cramp and Sons Ship and Engine Building Company v. International Curtis Marine Turbine Company	28 (1918)	White	none	none	3d Cir.	affirmed
Marconi Wireless Telegraph Company of America v. Simon	46 (1918)	White	none	none	2d Cir.	reversed
Gulf, Colorado and Santa Fe Railway Company v. Texas	58 (1918)	Holmes	none	none	Tex. Civ. App.	affirmed
Municipal Securities Corporation v. City of Kansas City	63 (1918)	Day	none	none	Mo.	dismissed
Krueger v. United States	69 (1918)	Day	none	none	8th Cir.	affirmed
People's Tobacco Company v. American Tobacco Company	79 (1918)	Day	none	none	E.D. La.	affirmed
Brader v. James	88 (1918)	Day	none	none	Okla.	affirmed
Eiger v. Garrity	97 (1918)	Day	none	none	Ill.	affirmed
Talley v. Burgess	104 (1918)	Day	none	none	Okla.	affirmed
Anicker v. Gunsburg	110 (1918)	Day	none	none	8th Cir.	affirmed
Great Northern Railroad Company v. Donaldson	121 (1918)	Day	none	none	Wash.	affirmed
Ex parte Slater	128 (1918)	VanDevanter	none	none	E.D. Mo.	mandamus denied
International Paper Company v. Massachusetts	135 (1918)	VanDevanter	none	none	Mass.	reversed
Locomobile Company of America v. Massachusetts	146 (1918)	VanDevanter	none	none	Mass.	reversed
Cheney Brothers Company v. Massachusetts	147 (1918)	VanDevanter	none	none	Mass.	multiple
Arkansas v. Tennessee	158 (1918)	Pitney	none	none	original	boundary set
City of Denver v. Denver Union Water Company	178 (1918)	Pitney	none	Holmes	D. Colo.	affirmed
Sutton v. English	199 (1918)	Pitney	none	none	E.D. Tex.	affirmed
Denee v. Ankeny	208 (1918)	McReynolds	none	none	Wash.	affirmed
Lane v. Morrison	214 (1918)	McReynolds	none	none	D.C. Cir.	reversed
United States v. Bathgate	220 (1918)	McReynolds	none	none	S.D. Ohio	affirmed
Egan v. McDonald	227 (1918)	Brandeis	none	none	S.D.	affirmed
Chicago Board of Trade v. United States	231 (1918)	Brandeis	none	none	N.D. Ill.	reversed
Sears v. City of Akron	242 (1918)	Brandeis	none	none	N.D. Ohio	affirmed
Nelson v. Southern Railroad Company	253 (1918)	Brandeis	none	none	N.C.	affirmed
Bilby v. Stewart	255 (1918)	Brandeis	none	none	Okla.	dismissed
Brogan v. National Surety Company	257 (1918)	Brandeis	none	none	6th Cir.	reversed
McCurdy v. United States	263 (1918)	Brandeis	none	none	W.D. Okla.	reversed
Andrews v. Nix and Company	273 (1918)	Clarke	none	none	N.J.	affirmed
Great Northern Railroad Company v. Alexander	276 (1918)	Clarke	none	none	Mont.	dismissed
Northern Pacific Railroad Company v. Wismer	283 (1918)	Clarke	none	none	9th Cir.	affirmed
Cissna v. Tennessee	289 (1918)	Pitney	none	none	Tenn.	reversed
Oetjen v. Central Leather Company	297 (1918)	Clarke	none	none	Hudson County Cir. Ct.	affirmed
Ricaud v. American Metal Company	304 (1918)	Clarke	none	none	5th Cir.	certification
Stadelman v. Miner	311 (1918)	White	none	none	Or.	rehearing granted
Rock Spring Distlling Company v. W.A. Gaines and Company	312 (1918)	McKenna	none	none	6th Cir.	reversed
Ireland v. Woods	323 (1918)	McKenna	none	none	N.Y.	dismissed
Union Pacific Railroad Company v. Hadley	330 (1918)	Holmes	none	none	Neb.	affirmed
Wells v. Roper	335 (1918)	Pitney	none	none	D.C. Cir.	affirmed
Sheckels v. District of Columbia	338 (1918)	Pitney	none	none	Ct. Cl.	affirmed
Omaechevarria v. Idaho	343 (1918)	Brandeis	none	none	Idaho	affirmed
Pendleton v. Benner Line	353 (1918)	Holmes	none	none	2d Cir.	affirmed
New York Life Insurance Company v. Dodge	357 (1918)	McReynolds	none	Brandeis	Mo. App.	reversed
Smith v. Jackson	388 (1918)	White	none	none	5th Cir.	affirmed
Spring Valley Water Company v. City and County of San Francisco	391 (1918)	White	none	none	9th Cir.	affirmed
City of Mitchell v. Dakota Central Telephone Company	396 (1918)	McKenna	none	none	D.S.D.	reversed
City of Covington v. South Covington and Cincinnati Street Railway Company	413 (1918)	Holmes	none	Clarke	E.D. Ky.	affirmed
International–Great Northern Railroad Company v. Anderson County	424 (1918)	Holmes	none	none	Tex. App.	affirmed
Great Northern Railroad Company v. Minnesota ex rel. Village of Clara City	434 (1918)	Day	none	none	Minn.	affirmed
Boston and Maine Railroad Company v. Piper	439 (1918)	Day	none	none	Vt.	affirmed
Salt Lake Investment Company v. Oregon Short Line Railroad Company	446 (1918)	VanDevanter	none	none	Utah	affirmed
Cudahy Packing Company v. Minnesota	450 (1918)	VanDevanter	none	none	Minn.	affirmed
Manufacturers' Railroad Company v. United States	457 (1918)	Pitney	none	none	E.D. Mo.	affirmed
Dalton Adding Machine Company v. Virginia ex rel. State Corporation Commission	498 (1918)	McReynolds	none	none	Va.	affirmed
General Railway Signal Company v. Virginia ex rel. State Corporation Commission	500 (1918)	McReynolds	none	none	Va.	affirmed
Chicago and North Western Railway Company v. United States	512 (1918)	McReynolds	none	none	7th Cir.	reversed
United States v. Schider	519 (1918)	McReynolds	none	none	S.D.N.Y.	reversed
Bethlehem Steel Company v. United States	523 (1918)	Brandeis	none	none	Ct. Cl.	affirmed
Louisville and Nashville Railroad Company v. Holloway	525 (1918)	Brandeis	none	none	Ky.	affirmed
United States v. Soldana	530 (1918)	Brandeis	none	none	D. Mont.	reversed
United States v. Weitzel	533 (1918)	Brandeis	none	none	E.D. Ky.	affirmed
Stadelman v. Miner	544 (1918)	Brandeis	none	none	Or.	dismissed
Thompson v. United States	547 (1918)	Clarke	none	none	Ct. Cl.	affirmed
United States v. Whited and Wheless, Ltd.	552 (1918)	Clarke	none	none	5th Cir.	reversed
Virginia v. West Virginia	565 (1918)	White	none	none	original	continued
Waite v. Macy	606 (1918)	Holmes	none	none	2d Cir.	affirmed
Saalfield v. United States	610 (1918)	Clarke	none	none	Ct. Cl.	affirmed
Ibanez v. Hong Kong and Shanghai Banking Corporation I	621 (1918)	McKenna	none	none	Phil.	affirmed
Ibanez v. Hong Kong and Shanghai Banking Corporation II	627 (1918)	McKenna	none	none	Phil.	affirmed
Dickinson v. Stiles	631 (1918)	Holmes	none	none	Minn.	affirmed
E.H. Emery and Company v. American Refrigerator Transit Company	634 (1918)	Holmes	none	none	S.D. Iowa	reversed
United States ex rel. Louisville Cement Company v. Interstate Commerce Commission	638 (1918)	Clarke	none	none	D.C. Cir.	reversed
