= United States v. Trans-Missouri Freight Association =

- Supreme Court of the United States

Argued December 8–9, 1896 Decided March 22, 1897
- Full case name: United States v. Trans-Missouri Freight Association
- Citations: 166 U.S. 290 (more) 17 S. Ct. 540; 41 L. Ed. 1007; 1897 U.S. LEXIS 2025

Case history
- Prior: 53 F. 440 (C.C.D. Kan. 1892); affirmed, 58 F. 58 (8th Cir. 1893).

Court membership
- Chief Justice Melville Fuller Associate Justices Stephen J. Field · John M. Harlan; Horace Gray · David J. Brewer; Henry B. Brown · George Shiras Jr. Edward D. White · Rufus W. Peckham

Case opinions
- Majority: Peckham, joined by Fuller, Harlan, Brewer, Brown
- Dissent: White, joined by Field, Gray, Shiras

Laws applied
- Sherman Antitrust Act of 1890

United States v. Trans-Missouri Freight Association, 166 U.S. 290 (1897), was a United States Supreme Court case holding that the Sherman Act (which was an antitrust measure that prohibited anticompetitive behavior in commerce) applied to the railroad industry, even though the U.S. Congress had enacted a comprehensive regime of regulations for that industry.

== Background ==
Various railroad companies had formed an organization to regulate prices charged for transportation. The federal government charged these companies with violating the Sherman Act, and the railroad companies replied that they were not in violation of the act because their organization was designed to keep prices low, not to push them higher. The companies also contended that Congress had not intended the Sherman Act to apply to them, because there were already a wide array of laws governing the railroads.

== Opinion of the Court ==
The Supreme Court held that the Sherman Act prohibited all such combinations, irrespective of the purpose. The railroad association was price fixing under the per se approach. Competition should determine the reasonable rate, not agreements between companies. The court further held that congressional debate could not be used to decipher legislative intent due to the complex and often varying opinions on what the act means for different legislators

== See also ==
- US antitrust law
- List of United States Supreme Court cases, volume 166
