= Northern Securities Company =

American railroad trust company

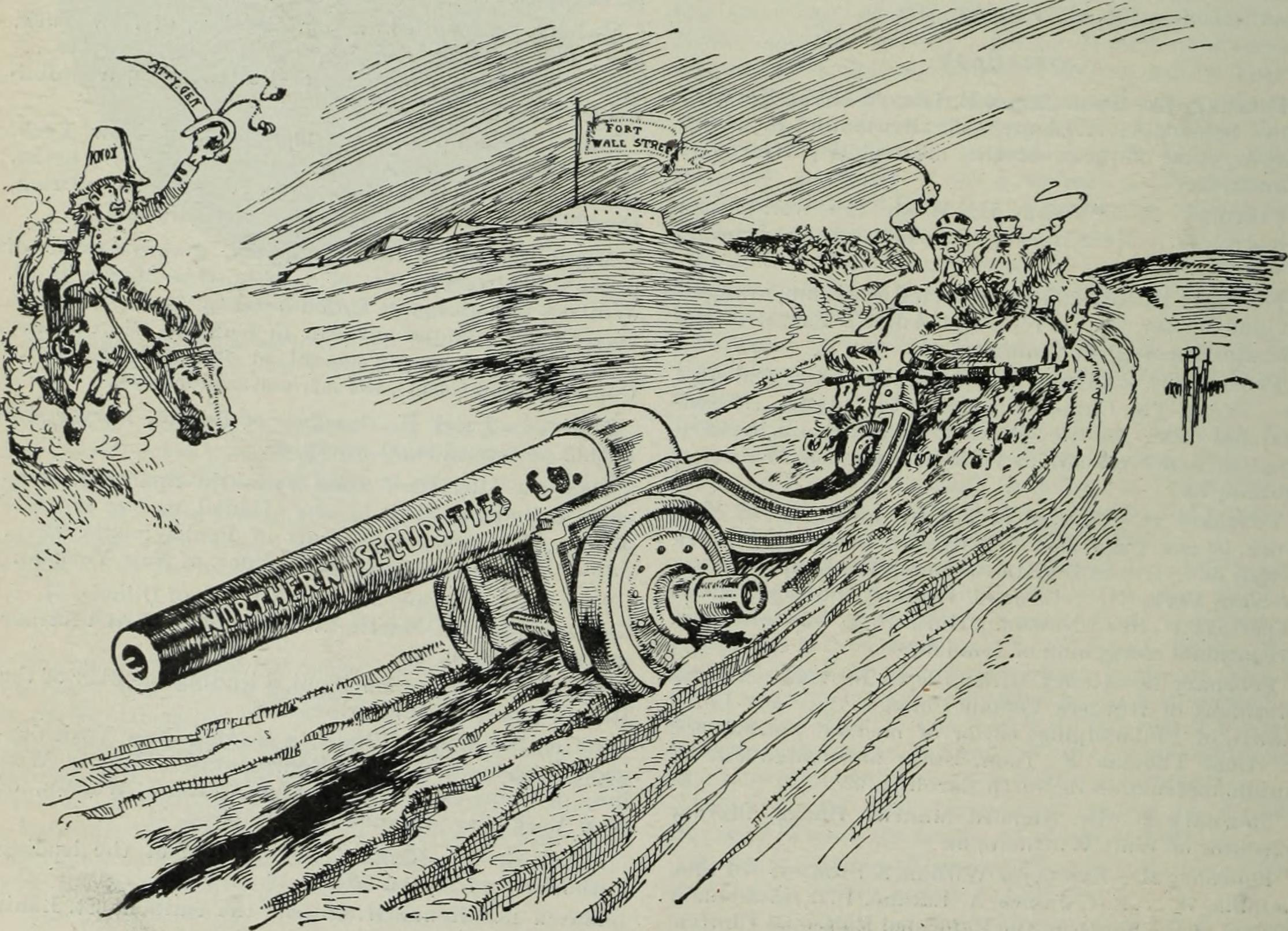
A big gun in danger (1902)

The Northern Securities Company was an American railroad trust formed in 1901 by E. H. Harriman, James J. Hill, J. P. Morgan and their associates. The company controlled the Northern Pacific Railway; Great Northern Railway; Chicago, Burlington and Quincy Railroad; and other associated lines. It was capitalized at $400 million, and Hill served as president.

The company was sued in 1902 under the Sherman Antitrust Act of 1890 by the Justice Department under President Theodore Roosevelt, one of the first antitrust cases filed against corporate interests instead of labor. The government won its case, and the company was dissolved, so that the three railroads again operated independently.

Hill was the president of the Great Northern Railway and Harriman controlled the Union Pacific Railroad, two of the largest railroads in the U.S. Both sought control of the Burlington to connect their roads to the vital railroad hub of Chicago, Illinois. Hill, who also had a minority interest in the Northern Pacific Railway, outbid Harriman for the Burlington, by agreeing to Burlington President Charles Elliott Perkins's $200-a-share price.

Together, the Great Northern and the Northern Pacific assumed control of nearly 100 percent of the Burlington's outstanding stock. Knowing that the Northern Pacific controlled almost 49.3 percent of the Burlington's stock, Harriman launched a stock raid against the Northern Pacific. Control of the Northern Pacific would allow him to appoint directors to the Burlington, which could then be forced to treat Harriman's Union Pacific favorably in business matters. Harriman's stock raid in May 1901 led to the "Northern Pacific Corner". Speculators had sold shares that they did not own, and were now desperate to purchase shares at any price-some shares reportedly sold at $1,000. Hill, working with J. P. Morgan, took majority control of the Northern Pacific despite Harriman's best efforts.

This speculation resonated throughout the stock market and the country as a whole. The two men, their backers, and associates agreed to settle their differences and eliminate ruinous competition through a monopolistic combination. The Northern Securities Company was formed by Hill to control the stock of his major railroad properties. Some of Harriman's directors were appointed as representatives for his holdings of Northern Pacific shares.

A public outcry over the new company made its way throughout the country, and both state and federal officials prepared to file litigation. On February 19, 1902, the United States Department of Justice announced plans to file a suit against the company. When approached by J. P. Morgan to settle the issue in private, President Roosevelt refused; he later remarked, "Mr. Morgan could not help regarding me as a big rival operator who either intended to ruin all his interests or could be induced to come to an agreement to ruin none." Although Roosevelt still believed that trusts were not always bad for society, he could not bear to feel treated as just another rival operator. The suit continued.

The Justice Department won the suit and the company was dissolved according to the 1904 Supreme Court ruling in Northern Securities Co. v. United States case, decided five to four. The companies were convicted under the Sherman Antitrust Act. In the following seven years, 44 other federal antitrust cases turned out rulings similar to the Northern Securities case. Included in these break-ups were Harriman's own holdings of the Union Pacific and Southern Pacific railroads.

The Northern Securities case was one of the earliest antitrust cases and provided important legal precedents for many later cases, including that against Major League Baseball.

In 1955, the Northern Pacific and Great Northern renewed talks of merging. The Supreme Court approved the merger, and as a result, the Great Northern, Northern Pacific, Chicago Burlington & Quincy, and the Spokane, Portland and Seattle Railway merged on March 2, 1970, to form the Burlington Northern Railroad.
