= Bates v. State Bar of Arizona =

- Supreme Court of the United States

Argued January 18, 1977 Decided June 27, 1977
- Full case name: John R. Bates and Van O'Steen v. State Bar of Arizona
- Citations: 433 U.S. 350 (more) 97 S. Ct. 2691; 53 L. Ed. 2d 810; 1977 U.S. LEXIS 23

Case history
- Prior: Attorney discipline imposed, In re Bates, 555 P.2d 640 (Ariz. 1976); probable jurisdiction noted, Bates v. State Bar of Arizona, 429 U.S. 813 (1976).
- Subsequent: Rehearing denied, 434 U.S. 881 (1977).

Holding
- The First Amendment allows lawyers to advertise in a manner that is not misleading to members of the general public.

Court membership
- Chief Justice Warren E. Burger Associate Justices William J. Brennan Jr. · Potter Stewart; Byron White · Thurgood Marshall; Harry Blackmun · Lewis F. Powell Jr. William Rehnquist · John P. Stevens

Case opinions
- Majority: Blackmun, joined by unanimous (Parts I, II); Brennan, White, Marshall, Stevens (Parts III, IV)
- Concur/dissent: Burger
- Concur/dissent: Powell, joined by Stewart
- Dissent: Rehnquist (in part)

Laws applied
- U.S. Const. amends. I, XIV

Bates v. State Bar of Arizona, 433 U.S. 350 (1977), was a United States Supreme Court case in which the Court upheld the right of lawyers to advertise their services. In holding that lawyer advertising was commercial speech entitled to protection under the First Amendment (incorporated against the States through the Fourteenth Amendment), the Court upset the tradition against advertising by lawyers, rejecting it as an antiquated rule of etiquette.

The Court emphasized the benefits of the information that flows to consumers through advertising, positing that lawyer advertising would make legal services more accessible to the general public and improve the overall administration of justice. The Court had previously held in Virginia State Pharmacy Board v. Virginia Citizens Consumer Council that advertising by pharmacists regarding the price of prescription drugs was commercial speech protected by the First Amendment.

== Background ==
John R. Bates and Van O'Steen graduated from the Arizona State University College of Law in 1972.

Two years later, they formed a legal clinic, in order to "provide legal services at modest fees to persons of moderate income who did not qualify for governmental legal aid". Therefore, they accepted only cases involving "routine matters, such as uncontested divorces, uncontested adoptions, simple personal bankruptcies, and changes of name" (and refused complicated cases, such as contested divorces), and kept costs down "by extensive use of paralegals, automatic typewriting equipment, and standardized forms and office procedures". "Because [they] set their prices so as to have a relatively low return on each case they handled, they depended on substantial volume" in order to make the clinic profitable.

Two years into the practice, Bates and O'Steen "concluded that their practice and clinical concept could not survive unless the availability of legal services at low cost was advertised and, in particular, fees were advertised". At the same time, the American Bar Association (ABA), whose decisions are advisory and not binding upon the bar associations of individual states, amended its rules of ethics on February 17, 1976, to endorse limited advertising by lawyers, albeit in telephone directories rather than in newspapers. Following the model of allowable information approved by the ABA, Bates and O'Steen decided to test the constitutionality of Arizona's prohibition against advertising and, three days after the ABA vote, placed an advertisement in the Arizona Republic on February 22, 1976.

The ad read:

Do you need a lawyer?
Legal services at very reasonable fees

- Divorce or legal separation — uncontested (both spouses sign papers) $175.00 plus $20.00 court filing fee
- Preparation of all court papers and instructions on how to do your own simple uncontested divorce $100.00
- Adoption — uncontested severance proceeding $225.00 plus approximately $10.00 publication cost
- Bankruptcy — non-business, no contested proceedings
  - Individual $250.00 plus $55.00 court filing fee
  - Wife and Husband $300.00 plus $110.00 court filing fee
- Change of Name $95.00 plus $20.00 court filing fee

Information regarding other types of cases furnished upon request
Legal Clinic of Bates & O'Steen

The ad was clearly labeled as an advertisement, and gave the downtown Phoenix address and phone number of the clinic.

In 1976, the State Bar of Arizona generally forbade lawyers in that state from advertising their services. The State Bar initiated disciplinary proceedings against Bates and O'Steen, beginning with a hearing before a Special Local Administrative Committee, which recommended that Bates and O'Steen be suspended from the practice of law for not less than six months. Upon review by the Board of Governors of the State Bar, the Board recommended that they only be suspended for one week each, since "[their] act... was undertaken as an earnest challenge to the validity of a rule they conscientiously believe to be invalid". The pair asked the Arizona Supreme Court to review the proceedings, and specifically contended that the absolute ban on lawyer advertising violated the Sherman Antitrust Act and the First Amendment. The court rejected both claims. The Sherman Act did not apply, the court ruled, because regulating the practice of law was an act inherent to the State of Arizona as sovereign, thus falling within the state-action exemption to the Sherman Act. Although the U.S. Supreme Court had recently ruled that, under the First Amendment, pharmacists could not be forbidden from advertising the prices of prescription drugs, the court reasoned that lawyer advertising was entitled to special considerations that took such speech out of the realm of First Amendment protection. Nevertheless, the court reduced the sanction against Bates and O'Steen to censure only because it felt that the advertising was "done in good faith to test the constitutionality" of the ban on lawyer advertising. Dissenting, Justice William A. Holohan believed that the ban on lawyer advertising impinged on the public's right to know about the activities of the legal profession, and concluded that the ban violated the First Amendment.

The U.S. Supreme Court concluded it had appellate jurisdiction over the case. (Note: Until 1988, 28 U.S.C. § 1257 provided for mandatory appellate U.S. Supreme Court jurisdiction over cases from state courts, where a state statute was challenged under federal law and upheld by the state court.) William C. Canby, Jr. argued for the appellants John Bates and Van O'Steen in the Supreme Court. At the time, Canby was a professor of law at Arizona State University; he would later be nominated and approved as a judge on the United States Court of Appeals for the Ninth Circuit. John Paul Frank argued for the appellee, the State Bar of Arizona. Frank was a partner in the Phoenix law firm of Lewis and Roca, and was previously on the brief for the petitioner in the case of Miranda v. Arizona. Deputy Solicitor General Daniel M. Friedman argued on behalf of the U.S. government, urging the Court to hold Arizona's ban on attorney advertising unconstitutional under the First Amendment.

== Decision ==
As Professor Thomas Morgan has put it,

The organized bar traditionally took the position that a lawyer was not permitted to actively publicize his services. In effect, it was presumed that every lawyer had an established clientele, or that a lawyer's reputation for good work would inevitably lead others to seek out the lawyer's services. Under this approach, direct publicity for lawyers was strictly controlled.

The Court's decision rejected this tradition as a historical anachronism, which created higher barriers to entry into the legal profession and functioned to "perpetuate the market position of established attorneys."

=== Sherman Act claim ===
The Court agreed with the Arizona Supreme Court that the state action exemption of Parker v. Brown applied to Arizona's ban on lawyer advertising, even though the Court had previously held that the Sherman Act applied to other lawyer-regulation activities. In Goldfarb v. Virginia State Bar, 421 U.S. 773 (1975), the Court held that a minimum-fee schedule enforced by the Virginia State Bar was a "classic example of price fixing" subject to regulation under the Sherman Act. The Court distinguished this case from Goldfarb because the Supreme Court of Virginia, exercising its sovereign power to regulate the practice of law, had not required the Virginia State Bar to undertake the anticompetitive activities. By contrast, Arizona's ban on lawyer advertising was "compelled by the direction of the state acting as a sovereign" because it was promulgated by the state supreme court. Accordingly, the Court affirmed the Arizona Supreme Court's rejection of the Sherman Act claim.

=== First Amendment claim ===
The Court held that speech does not escape protection under the First Amendment merely because it "proposes a mundane commercial transaction." Furthermore, commercial speech serves significant societal interests in that it informs the public of the availability, nature, and prices of products and services, allowing them to act rationally in a free enterprise system. The listener's interest in receiving information regarding potential commercial transactions is "substantial." In fact, "the consumer's concern for the free flow of commercial speech often may be far keener than his concern for urgent political dialogue."

These reasons were central to the Court's rejection of a ban on advertising the prices of prescription drugs in Virginia State Pharmacy Board v. Virginia Citizens Consumer Council, 425 U.S. 748 (1976). The Court held that the citizen's interest in knowing the price of certain prescription drugs at various pharmacies outweighed the desire to maintain "professionalism" among pharmacists; to prevent customers from price-shopping, which necessarily would take them away from the care of one particular pharmacist who could potentially monitor the patient for dangerous drug interactions; and to perpetuate the image of the pharmacist as a "skilled and specialized craftsman," which was argued to be crucial for recruiting new pharmacists.

By describing the holding in Virginia Pharmacy Board in this way, the result in Bates appeared a foregone conclusion. Nevertheless, the Court in the Virginia pharmacy case expressly reserved judgment on how that same balance might be struck with respect to other professions, as to which different constitutional considerations might come into play.

Nevertheless, the Court did characterize Arizona's ban on lawyer advertising as serving to "inhibit the free flow of information and keep the public in ignorance." It emphasized the advertisement Bates and O'Steen published was the most basic one possible – listing various services, the prices charged, and an address and telephone number. The central point of contention in this case was that the lawyers were advertising the prices they charged for particular services.

The State Bar of Arizona appealed to a desire to maintain a certain air of "professionalism" among lawyers as justifying its ban on lawyer advertising. Advertising, the State Bar asserted, would "undermine the attorney's sense of dignity and self-worth", "erode the client's trust in the attorney" by exposing an economic motive for representation, and "tarnish the dignified public image of the profession". But the public understands that attorneys make their living at the bar, and few attorneys deceive themselves by thinking otherwise. "Bankers and engineers advertise, and yet these professions are not regarded as undignified. In fact, it has been suggested that the failure of lawyers to advertise creates public disillusionment with the profession." A lack of information about the price of legal services tends to dissuade people of modest means from seeking legal representation, even when it is in their best interest to engage such representation. Finally, insofar as the "belief that lawyers are somehow 'above' trade has become an anachronism, the historical foundation for the advertising restraint has crumbled."

Nor is advertising by lawyers inherently misleading. The Court speculated that the "only services that lend themselves to advertising are the routine ones," precisely the services that Bates and O'Steen were advertising. "Although the precise service demanded in each task may vary slightly, and although legal services are not fungible, these facts do not make advertising misleading so long as the attorney does the necessary work at the advertised price. The argument that legal services are so unique that fixed rates cannot meaningfully be established is refuted by the record in this case: The State Bar itself sponsors a Legal Services Program in which the participating attorneys agree to perform services like those advertised by the appellants at standardized rates." And although advertising for legal services is necessarily incomplete — responsible lawyers will, of course, disclaim that all cases are "simple" ones — a rough estimate of the cost is more useful to the public than keeping them in the dark entirely.

To the extent that lawyer advertising might be said to encourage frivolous lawsuits, the Court countered that the American Bar Association had observed that the "middle 70% of our population is not being reached or served adequately by the legal profession," suggesting that a vast number of meritorious cases are being stifled for want of a lawyer willing and able to assist the client in bringing suit. Bans on advertising, moreover, are ineffective means of reducing lawyer overhead and of maintaining the quality of legal services provided. Finally, there was no reason to believe that allowing lawyers to advertise would result in a tidal wave of disingenuous claims for the state bar to investigate and prosecute, as Justice Powell feared would happen. "For every attorney who overreaches through advertising, there will be thousands of others who will be candid and honest and straightforward."

Having disposed of the arguments against allowing lawyer advertising, the Court ruled that Arizona's total ban on lawyer advertising violated the free speech guarantee of the First Amendment. But that did not mean that states were powerless to regulate lawyer advertising at all. The Court reiterated that states were still permitted to ban "false, deceptive, or misleading" advertising by lawyers; to regulate the manner in which lawyers may solicit business in person; to require warnings and disclaimers on lawyer advertising in order to assure that the public is not misled; and impose other reasonable restrictions on the time, place, and manner of lawyer advertising.

=== Dissent ===
In his dissent, Justice Powell pointed out that a lawyer's primary task, even in a "routine" divorce case, is one of diagnosis and advice: to point out to the client concerns of which he might not be aware, and ensure that the client addresses those concerns. Powell thought it difficult to enumerate a value for this aspect of legal representation, and hence for consumers to sense how much diagnosis and advice they could expect for a fixed, advertised price. Consequently, it is not possible to know whether Bates's and O'Steen's assertion that their fees were "reasonable" was an accurate one. "Whether a fee is 'very reasonable' is a matter of opinion, and not a matter of verifiable fact as the Court suggests. One unfortunate result of today's decision is that lawyers may feel free to use a wide variety of adjectives — such as 'fair,' 'moderate,' 'low-cost,' or 'lowest in town' — to describe the bargain they offer to the public."
