= North Carolina State Board of Dental Examiners v. FTC =

North Carolina Board of Dental Examiners v. Federal Trade Commission
- Supreme Court of the United States

Argued October 14, 2014 Decided February 25, 2015
- Full case name: North Carolina State Board of Dental Examiners, Petitioner v. Federal Trade Commission
- Docket no.: 13-534
- Citations: 574 U.S. 494 (more) 135 S. Ct. 1101; 191 L. Ed. 2d 35
- Argument: Oral argument
- Opinion announcement: Opinion announcement

Case history
- Prior: ALJ initial decision finding violation, 152 F.T.C. 75; summary decision against immunity defense, 151 F.T.C. 607; merits opinion and order finding violation, 152 F.T.C. 640 (2011); motion to dismiss granted, 768 F. Supp. 2d 818 (E.D.N.C. 2011); affirmed, 717 F.3d 359 (4th Cir. 2013); cert. granted, 571 U.S. 1236 (2014).

Holding
- If a controlling number of an agency's decisionmakers are active market participants in the occupation the agency regulates, the agency can invoke state-action antitrust immunity only if it was subject to active supervision by the State.

Court membership
- Chief Justice John Roberts Associate Justices Antonin Scalia · Anthony Kennedy; Clarence Thomas · Ruth Bader Ginsburg; Stephen Breyer · Samuel Alito; Sonia Sotomayor · Elena Kagan

Case opinions
- Majority: Kennedy, joined by Roberts, Ginsburg, Breyer, Sotomayor, Kagan
- Dissent: Alito, joined by Scalia, Thomas

Laws applied
- Sherman Antitrust Act

North Carolina State Board of Dental Examiners v. Federal Trade Commission, 574 U.S. 494 (2015), was a United States Supreme Court case on the scope of immunity from US antitrust law. The Supreme Court held that a state occupational licensing board that was primarily composed of persons active in the market it regulates has immunity from antitrust law only when it is actively supervised by the state. The North Carolina Board of Dental Examiners had relied on the Parker immunity doctrine, established by the Supreme Court case Parker v. Brown, which held that actions by state governments acting in their sovereignty did not violate antitrust law.

== Background ==
North Carolina legislation had designated the North Carolina State Board of Dental Examiners (NCBDE) to be "the agency of the State for the regulation of the practice of dentistry" and required that six of the eight members of the Board must be licensed, practicing dentists. Acting upon complaints by dentists, the Board issued cease-and-desist orders to non-dentists offering tooth whitening services and teeth whitening product manufacturers, often warning that the practicing without a license of dentistry is a crime. These orders prompted many non-dentists to stop offering these services in North Carolina.

On June 17, 2010, the Federal Trade Commission filed a complaint to the FTC administrative court alleging that the Board's actions were anti-competitive and unlawful under the Federal Trade Commission Act. An administrative law judge refused to dismiss the complaint on the Board's claim that they had state-action immunity and later ruled that the Board's concerted action constituted an unreasonable restraint of trade and a method of unfair competition, falling afoul of antitrust law. The ruling was sustained by the United States Court of Appeals for the Fourth Circuit and the United States Supreme Court granted certiorari. Oral arguments were held on October 14, 2014.

== Opinion of the Court ==
The Supreme Court ruled 6–3 that a state licensing board that is composed primarily of active market participants has state action immunity from antitrust law only when it is actively supervised by the state. Justice Anthony Kennedy begins his opinion for the Court by extolling the Sherman Antitrust Act as "a central safeguard for the Nation's free market structures." That said, Justice Kennedy notes that the States' power to regulate would be "impermissibly burdened" if they had to obey United States antitrust law. To address this, the Court in Parker v. Brown (1943) granted California immunity from federal antitrust laws after the state created a New Deal raisin cartel. Statehouses happily delegated Parker immunity to trade associations and when attorneys began using this delegation to set a price floor the Court in Goldfarb v. Virginia State Bar (1975) found Parker immunity required what Justice Kennedy calls “more than a mere facade of state involvement”.

Because the Sherman Act was designed to break private monopolies, Justice Kennedy does not accept that the "congressional judgment" was to allow the States to delegate their immunity to a private monopoly. After California delegated price fixing authority directly to wine merchants, the Court in California Retail Liquor Dealers Ass'n v. Midcal Aluminum, Inc. (1980) began limiting immunity to where the State has articulated a clear anticompetitive policy and the State provides active supervision of the anticompetitive conduct.

North Carolina did not claim it had set any policy regarding teeth whitening nor did it claim it exercised any supervision over the Dentists Board. Nevertheless, because a city received Parker immunity without active State supervision in Hallie v. Eau Claire, 471 U.S. 34 (1985), the Dentists Board claimed that active State supervision is unnecessary for any state agency. Unimpressed, Justice Kennedy writes that "Parker immunity does not derive from nomenclature alone" but rather from accountability to voters in elections. Because dentists control the Dentists Board, Justice Kennedy finds the need for the antitrust laws "applies to this case with full force, particularly in light of the risks licensing boards dominated by market participants may pose to the free market." However, Justice Kennedy declines to define when a board is dominated or what State involvement is needed, writing “It suffices to note that the inquiry regarding active supervision is flexible and context-dependent.”

The Dentists Board further argued that denying it antitrust immunity would remove the main incentive for dentists to serve on the board. Justice Kennedy responds by citing the Hippocratic Oath, writing “those who pursue a calling must embrace ethical standards that derive from a duty separate from the dictates of the state.”

Because a controlling number of the Board's decisionmakers are active market participants in the occupation the Board regulates, the Board can invoke state-action antitrust immunity only if it was subject to active supervision by the State, and here that requirement is not met.

— Majority opinion

== Dissent ==
Justice Samuel Alito, joined by Justice Scalia and Justice Thomas, dissented. Justice Alito begins by noting "there is nothing new about the structure of the North Carolina Board" and that self-serving by such boards is, likewise, not new. Justice Alito then recalls that when the Sherman Act was enacted, Congress's Commerce Clause power was much smaller and that at the time the States frequently set price controls. As such, Justice Alito believes denying the Dentists Board antitrust immunity “diminishes our traditional respect for federalism and state sovereignty”.

For Justice Alito, the Dentists Board is clearly a state agency. As support, he includes the North Carolina statutes referring to the Dentists Board as a list of bullet points. Justice Alito also attacks Justice Kennedy for not articulating a clear standard of when a state agency is privately controlled. To underline this point, Justice Alito provides three full paragraphs of open questions. Finally, Justice Alito deplores of using the Court to address regulatory capture, speculating that even the FTC has been captured.
