= State act =

State act, state action, or act of state may refer to:

- Act of state doctrine, legal doctrine that sovereign states must respect the independence of other sovereign states
- State occasion
- Exercise of the royal prerogative was formerly called an "act of state"
- State action, doctrine that only state actions are subject to regulation under the US Constitution
- Parker immunity doctrine, legal doctrine in U.S. courts that certain acts of the U.S. state governments are immune from antitrust liability
- Sovereign immunity, legal doctrine that a sovereign state cannot commit a legal wrong

== See also ==
- State law (disambiguation)
