= Virginia Bar =

Virginia Bar can refer to either the

- Virginia Bar Association, a voluntary organization of lawyers, judges and law school faculty and students in Virginia
- Virginia State Bar, the administrative agency of the Supreme Court of Virginia
