= California Retail Liquor Dealers Ass'n v. Midcal Aluminum, Inc. =

California Retail Liquor Dealers Assn. v. Midcal Aluminum, Inc.
- Supreme Court of the United States

Argued January 16, 1980 Decided March 3, 1980
- Full case name: California Retail Liquor Dealers Assn. v. Midcal Aluminum, Inc., et al.
- Citations: 445 U.S. 97 (more) 100 S. Ct. 937; 63 L. Ed. 2d 233; 1980 U.S. LEXIS 86

Case history
- Prior: 90 Cal. App. 3d 979, 153 Cal. Rptr. 757 (affirmed)

Holding
- California's wine pricing system constitutes resale price maintenance in violation of the Sherman Act, since the wine producer holds the power to prevent price competition by dictating the prices charged by wholesalers.

Court membership
- Chief Justice Warren E. Burger Associate Justices William J. Brennan Jr. · Potter Stewart; Byron White · Thurgood Marshall; Harry Blackmun · Lewis F. Powell Jr. William Rehnquist · John P. Stevens

Case opinion
- Majority: Powell, joined by unanimous
- Brennan took no part in the consideration or decision of the case.

Laws applied
- U.S. Const. amend. XXI, Sherman Antitrust Act

California Retail Liquor Dealers Assn. v. Midcal Aluminum, Inc., 445 U.S. 97 (1980), was a United States Supreme Court case in which the Court created a two-part test for the application of the state action immunity doctrine that it had previously developed in Parker v. Brown.

== Background ==
A California statute required all wine producers and wholesalers to file fair trade contracts or price schedules with the State. If a producer has not set prices through a fair trade contract, wholesalers must post a resale price schedule and are prohibited from selling wine to a retailer at other than the price set in a price schedule or fair trade contract. A wholesaler selling below the established prices faces fines or license suspension or revocation.

After being charged with selling wine for less than the prices set by price schedules and also for selling wines for which no fair trade contract or schedule had been filed, respondent wholesaler filed suit in the California Court of Appeal asking for an injunction against the State's wine-pricing scheme. The Court of Appeal ruled that the scheme restrains trade in violation of the Sherman Act, and granted injunctive relief, rejecting claims that the scheme was immune from liability under that Act under the "state action" doctrine of Parker v. Brown, 317 U.S. 341, and was also protected by § 2 of the Twenty-first Amendment, which prohibits the transportation or importation of intoxicating liquors into any State for delivery or use therein in violation of the State's laws.

== Opinion of the Court ==
1. California's wine-pricing system constitutes resale price maintenance in violation of the Sherman Act, since the wine producer holds the power to prevent price competition by dictating the prices charged by wholesalers. And the State's involvement in the system is insufficient to establish antitrust immunity under Parker v. Brown. While the system satisfies the first requirement for such immunity that the challenged restraint be "one clearly articulated and affirmatively expressed as state policy," it does not meet the other requirement that the policy be "actively supervised" by the State itself. Under the system the State simply authorizes price setting and enforces the prices established by private parties, and it does not establish prices, review the reasonableness of price schedules, regulate the terms of fair trade contracts, monitor market conditions, or engage in any "pointed reexamination" of the program. The national policy in favor of competition cannot be thwarted by casting such a gauzy cloak of state involvement over what is essentially a private price-fixing arrangement. Pp. 102–106.

2. The Twenty-first Amendment does not bar application of the Sherman Act to California's wine-pricing system. Pp. 106–114.

(a) Although under that Amendment States retain substantial discretion to establish liquor regulations over and above those governing the importation or sale of liquor and the structure of the liquor distribution system, those controls may be subject to the federal commerce power in appropriate situations. Pp. 106-110.

(b) There is no basis for disagreeing with the view of the California courts that the asserted state interests behind the resale price maintenance system of promoting temperance and protecting small retailers are less substantial than the national policy in favor of competition. Such view is reasonable and is supported by the evidence, there being nothing to indicate that the wine-pricing system helps sustain small retailers or inhibits the consumption of alcohol by Californians. Pp. 110-114.

== See also ==
- List of United States Supreme Court cases, volume 445
