= Nixon v. United States =

- Supreme Court of the United States

Argued October 14, 1992 Decided January 13, 1993
- Full case name: Walter L. Nixon, Petitioner v. United States, et al.
- Citations: 506 U.S. 224 (more) 113 S. Ct. 732; 122 L. Ed. 2d 1; 1993 U.S. LEXIS 834; 61 U.S.L.W. 4069; 93 Cal. Daily Op. Service 279; 93 Daily Journal DAR 574; 6 Fla. L. Weekly Fed. S 821
- Argument: Oral argument

Case history
- Prior: 744 F.Supp. 9 (D.D.C. 1990), aff'd, 938 F.2d 239 (D.C. Cir. 1991), cert. granted, 502 U.S. 1090 (1992).
- Subsequent: None

Holding
- The contention that Senate committees appointed to gather evidence in an impeachment trial are unconstitutional is nonjusticiable because impeachment is a political question.

Court membership
- Chief Justice William Rehnquist Associate Justices Byron White · Harry Blackmun; John P. Stevens · Sandra Day O'Connor; Antonin Scalia · Anthony Kennedy; David Souter · Clarence Thomas

Case opinions
- Majority: Rehnquist, joined by Stevens, O'Connor, Scalia, Kennedy, Thomas
- Concurrence: Stevens
- Concurrence: White (in judgment), joined by Blackmun
- Concurrence: Souter (in judgment)

Laws applied
- U.S. Const. Art. I, Section 3, Clause 6

Nixon v. United States, 506 U.S. 224 (1993), was a United States Supreme Court decision that determined that a question of whether the Senate had properly tried an impeachment was political in nature and could not be resolved in the courts if there was no applicable judicial standard.

== Background ==
The Chief Judge for the United States District Court for the Southern District of Mississippi, Walter Nixon, was convicted of committing perjury before a grand jury but refused to resign from office even after he had been incarcerated. Nixon was subsequently impeached by the US House of Representatives, and the matter was referred to the Senate for a vote on Nixon's removal. The Senate appointed a committee to hear the evidence against Nixon and later report to the body as a whole. The Senate then heard the report of the committee and voted to remove Nixon from office. Nixon contended that this did not meet the constitutional requirement of Article I for the case to be "tried by the Senate".

== Decision ==
The court's decision was unanimous, but four separate opinions were published. The majority opinion, by Chief Justice William Rehnquist, held that the courts may not review the impeachment and trial of a federal officer because the Constitution reserves that function to a coordinate political branch. Article I, Section 3 of the Constitution gives the Senate the "sole power to try all impeachments." Because of the word sole it is clear that the judicial branch was not to be included. Furthermore, because the word try was originally understood to include factfinding committees, there was a textually demonstrable commitment to give broad discretion to the Senate in impeachments.

Furthermore, the Framers believed that representatives of the people should try impeachments, and the Court was too small to justly try impeachments. Also, the judicial branch is "checked" by impeachments, so judicial involvement in impeachments might violate the doctrine of the separation of powers.

The Court further ruled that involving the judiciary would prevent finality without clear remedy and bias post-impeachment criminal or civil prosecutions, which the Constitution explicitly allows.

Justices Byron White, Harry Blackmun, and David Souter concurred, but voiced concern that the Court was foreclosing the area for review. While they found that the Senate had done all that was constitutionally required, they were concerned that the Court should have the power to review cases in which the Senate removed an impeached officer summarily without a hearing, or through some arbitrary process such as "a coin toss."

An important feature of this case is how it diverges from Powell v. McCormack (1969). In Powell, a grant of discretionary power to Congress was deemed to be justiciable because it required a mere "interpretation" of the Constitution.

== See also ==
- List of United States Supreme Court cases, volume 506
