= Bray v. Alexandria Women's Health Clinic =

- Supreme Court of the United States

Argued October 16, 1991 Reargued October 6, 1992 Decided January 13, 1993
- Full case name: Jayne Bray, et al., Petitioners v. Alexandria Women's Health Clinic, et al.
- Citations: 506 U.S. 263 (more) 113 S. Ct. 753; 122 L. Ed. 2d 34; 1993 U.S. LEXIS 833; 61 U.S.L.W. 4080; 93 Cal. Daily Op. Service 258; 93 Daily Journal DAR 583

Case history
- Prior: National Organization for Women v. Operation Rescue, 726 F. Supp. 1483 (E.D. Va. 1989), affirmed, 914 F.2d 582 (4th Cir. 1990); cert. granted, 498 U.S. 1119 (1991).

Holding
- The first clause of 1985(3) does not provide a federal cause of action against persons obstructing access to abortion clinics.

Court membership
- Chief Justice William Rehnquist Associate Justices Byron White · Harry Blackmun; John P. Stevens · Sandra Day O'Connor; Antonin Scalia · Anthony Kennedy; David Souter · Clarence Thomas

Case opinions
- Majority: Scalia, joined by Rehnquist, White, Kennedy, Thomas
- Concurrence: Kennedy
- Concur/dissent: Souter
- Dissent: Stevens, joined by Blackmun
- Dissent: O'Connor, joined by Blackmun

Laws applied
- 42 U.S.C. § 1985(3)

Bray v. Alexandria Women's Health Clinic, 506 U.S. 263 (1993) is a United States Supreme Court case in which the court held that Section 1985(3) of The Civil Rights Act of 1871 does not provide a federal cause of action against persons obstructing access to abortion clinics. Alexandria Health Clinic, along with several other abortion clinics, sued to prevent Jayne Bray and other anti-abortion protesters from blocking the entrance to clinics in Washington D.C.

Alexandria Women's Health Clinic claimed that the protesters violated Section 1985 of The Civil Rights Act of 1871, which prohibits two or more people on a highway or other premises from depriving “any person or class of persons of the equal protection of the laws, or of equal privileges and immunities under the laws.”

== Background ==
=== Facts of the Case ===
An action was brought against Operation Rescue, an organization of members who oppose abortion, by clinics that perform abortions and organizations that support abortions and whose members may wish to use an abortion clinic. Operation Rescue organizes anti-abortion demonstrations in which participants trespass on, and obstruct general access to, the premises of abortion clinics. The clinics sued to enjoin Operation Rescue from conducting demonstrations at abortion clinics in the Washington, D. C., metropolitan area.

Operation Rescue asserted that its members had not violated section 1985(3), claiming that the statute requires a class-based, discriminatory animus underlying the action. The clinics countered that the actions of the protesters demonstrated a discriminatory animus against women.

=== Lower Court Rulings ===
Alexandria Health Clinic argued that the protesters were present to deny women their right to abortion and their right to interstate travel.

Following an expedited trial, the District Court ruled that petitioners had violated section 1985(3) by conspiring to deprive women seeking abortions of their right to interstate travel. The court also ruled for respondents on their pendent state-law claims of trespass and public nuisance. The court ordered the protesters to pay the clinics’ attorney's fees and costs on the 1985(3) claim.

The Court of Appeals for the Fourth Circuit affirmed the district court decision in National Organization for Women v. Operation Rescue, 726 F. Supp. 1483 (E.D. Va. 1989) The court found that Bray and others had blocked access to the clinics, therefore depriving women seeking abortions of the right to interstate travel.

=== 42 U.S.C. 1985(3) - Conspiracy to interfere with civil rights ===
Section 1985's subsection 3 forbids Conspiracy to interfere with civil rights. It establishes that if two or more persons within the United States act for the purpose of directly or indirectly depriving any person or class of persons of equal protections or privileges under the law, the injured party or parties may have a cause of action for damages against one or more of the conspirators.

=== Prior Supreme Court decisions ===
==== Griffin v. Breckenridge ====
In Griffin v. Breckenridge, 403 U.S. 88 (1971), the court held that the defendants had violated the petitioners' constitutionally protected right to travel. The case involved black plaintiffs who had been stopped and assaulted and beaten with a deadly weapon while they were riding in a car. It was claimed that the purpose of the attack was to prevent the plaintiffs from enjoying equal protection under the laws of the United States and the state of Mississippi.

The court found that there is nothing inherent in the wording of Section 1985 that requires state action, noting that an element of companion section 1983 is that the deprivation complained of must have been inflicted under color of state law and that to read any such requirement into 1985 (3) would thus deprive that section of all independent effect. Additionally, based on legislative history, the court concluded that "...the language requiring intent to deprive of equal protection, or equal privileges and immunities, means that there must be some racial, or perhaps otherwise class-based, invidiously discriminatory animus behind the conspirators' action."

The case is commonly cited for the four essential elements that it identified as being required to support a cause of action under 42 U.S.C. 1985(3):

1. Conspiracy
2. A purpose of depriving, either directly or indirectly, any person or class of persons of the equal protection of the laws, or of equal privileges and immunities under the laws.
3. Action in furtherance of the object of [the] conspiracy,
4. An injury to person or property" or a deprivation of having and exercising any right or privilege of a citizen of the United States.

==== Carpenters v. Scott ====
In Carpenters v. Scott, 463 U.S. 825 (1983), A construction company had hired nonunion workers for a project, resulting in the organization of a citizen protest against the company. During the protest at the construction site, company employees were assaulted and beaten, and construction equipment was burned and destroyed, delaying construction and causing the company to default on its contract.

The court reaffirmed the Griffin finding that section 1983 does not require state action when applied to rights that themselves do not require state action. The court addressed the specific question of whether a section 1985(3) claim can be made against individuals with respect to rights that are prohibitions of certain state actions. Rights that in themselves require state action must necessarily present a claim of state involvement.

The construction company's claim was denied. The court held that a conspiracy to infringe First Amendment rights requires proof that the State is involved in the conspiracy or that the aim of the conspiracy is to influence the activity of the State. It also found that this case did not present the kind of animus that § 1985(3) requires.

== Supreme Court ==
=== Opinion of the Court ===
By a 5 to 3 majority, the Supreme Court held that Section 1945(3) does not provide a cause of action for protesters blocking entrance to an abortion clinic.

In the decision delivered by Justice Antonin Scalia, the court rejected the claim that "women who want abortions" is a class that could satisfy the suggestion in Griffin that discrimination as contemplated under Section 1984(s) could extend beyond the issue of race. The rationale was that if "women who want an abortion" is a class requiring protection, then it would necessarily follow that "people who want to engage in any activity that we seek to prevent" would qualify for similar protection under the statute.

The court concluded this would convert the statute into the "general federal tort law" that the animus requirement seeks to avoid, finding that the conspiracy, "... must aim at a deprivation of the equal enjoyment of rights secured by the law to all."

Based on the District Court's finding that the petitioners (Operation Rescue members) described their activity with reference to a physical intervention between abortion practitioners and "the innocent victims", the Court concluded that the "animus" requirement could not be met because the demonstrations were not motivated by a purpose directed at women as a class. Therefore, the court does not decide whether women in general would qualify as a §1985(3) class under Griffin. Justice Scalia simply states that "women seeking abortion" is not a qualifying class.

Based on this record, Justice Scalia concluded that a class-based animus could be established only if either:

1. opposition to abortion can reasonably be presumed to reflect a sex-based intent, or
2. intent is irrelevant, and a class-based animus can be determined solely by effect.

With respect to the first possibility, the court rejects the notion that opposition to voluntary abortion might be considered an "irrational surrogate" for opposition to women. Justice Scalia states that with respect to abortion, "...it cannot be denied that there are common and respectable reasons for opposing it, other than hatred of, or condescension toward, women as a class."

Justice Scalia frames the final determination of necessary animus as a question "...of whether the proposition that intent is legally irrelevant; that since voluntary abortion is an activity engaged in only by women, to disfavor it is ipso facto to discriminate invidiously against women as a class." The opinion answers this question in the negative, stating that prior cases do not support this. The opinion cites two prior cases:

1. Geduldig v. Aiello, 417 U. S. 484 (1974), that found that a state disability insurance system that denied coverage to certain disabilities resulting from pregnancy had not discriminated on the basis of sex, stating that because "... only women can become pregnant, it does not follow that every legislative classification concerning pregnancy is a sex-based classification."
2. Personnel Administrator of Mass. v. Feeney, 442 U. S. 256 (1979), that reached a "similar conclusion" in denying an Equal Protection Clause challenge to a Massachusetts law giving employment preference to military veterans, a class which in Massachusetts was over 98% male."

Under Feeney "discriminatory purpose" implies more than "intent as awareness of consequences", it implies that "adverse effects upon an identifiable group" were, at least in part, the purpose of the activity. The decision in Bray holds that the same principle applies to "the class-based invidiously discriminatory animus" requirement of §1985(3) and the class-based animus can not be determined by the effect.

Four justices filed separate opinions:

1. Anthony Kennedy filed a concurring opinion
2. David H Souter filed an opinion concurring in the judgment in part and dissenting in part
3. John Paul Stevens filed a dissenting opinion, joined by Harry A. Blackmun
4. Sandra Day O'Connor filed a dissenting opinion, joined by Harry A. Blackmun

=== Concurrences ===
Justice Anthony Kennedy filed a concurring opinion noting that there are three separate dissenting opinions in this case offering differing interpretations of the statute in question. He concludes that "Given the difficulty of the question, this is understandable, but the dissenters' inability to agree on a single rationale confirms, in my view, the correctness of the Court's opinion. As all recognize, essential considerations of federalism are at stake here. The federal balance is a fragile one, and a false step in interpreting § 1985(3) risks making a whole catalog of ordinary state crimes a concurrent violation of a single congressional statute passed more than a century ago."

Justice David H Souter filed an opinion concurring in the judgment in part and dissenting in part. The opinion supports the court's decision insofar as it relies on stare decisis, but disagrees with the Griffin and Carpenters "rights guaranteed against private encroachment" and "class-based animus" requirements. In his opinion, Justice Scalia characterizes Souter's approach as "(1) undertaking a full-dress reconsideration of Griffin and Carpenters, (2) concluding that both those cases were wrongly decided, and (3) limiting the damage of those supposed errors by embracing an interpretation of the statute that concededly gives the same language in two successive clauses completely different meanings."

=== Dissents ===
Justice John Paul Stevens filed a dissenting opinion, joined by Harry A. Blackmun. Justice Stevens concludes that in this case, the court has bypassed the plain language of the law in favor of relying on prior precedent, noting that in those cases the statute had been narrowly construed in order to avoid what were perceived to be serious constitutional issues within the statute itself. In Justice Stevens' view, the protesters "... engaged in a nationwide conspiracy; to achieve their goal they repeatedly occupied public streets and trespassed on the premises of private citizens in order to prevent or hinder the constituted authorities from protecting access to abortion clinics by women, a substantial number of whom traveled in interstate commerce to reach the destinations blockaded by petitioners. The case involves no ordinary trespass, nor anything remotely resembling the peaceful picketing of a local retailer. It presents a striking contemporary example of the kind of zealous, politically motivated, lawless conduct that led to the enactment of the Ku Klux Act in 1871 and gave it its name." Justice Scalia counters that "Those are certainly evocative assertions, but as far as the point of law we have been asked to decide is concerned, they are irrelevant...." Scalia notes that to the extent that the protesters violated state and local laws, they are subject to criminal prosecution and civil claims within those jurisdictions.

Justice Sandra Day O'Connor filed a dissenting opinion, joined by Harry A. Blackmun. Justice O'Connor characterizes Griffin's requirement of a "class-based animus" as a shorthand description of the types of actions that the statute is meant to address. However, she agreed with the dissent in Carpenters that "... Congress had in mind a functional definition of the scope of [§ 1985(3)]," and intended to "provide a federal remedy for all classes that seek to exercise their legal rights in unprotected circumstances similar to those of the victims of Klan violence." Accordingly, she would have found that § 1985(3) protected "...nonunion employees injured by mob violence in a "self-professed union town" whose residents resented nonunion activities." It is O'Connor's opinion that if a class is protected by the statute, then it must apply to actions where the motivation is directly related to the unique characteristics of that class. She concludes that the action of blocking access to an abortion clinic is class-based within the meaning of Griffin because it is directly related to the unique abilities of women to become pregnant and to terminate their pregnancies.

== Subsequent Developments ==
=== Schenck v. Pro-Choice Network, Western N.Y ===
In Schenck v. Pro-Choice Network, Western N.Y, 519 U.S. 357 (1997), the Supreme Court held that an injunction provision that required abortion protesters to move away from abortion clinic patients who asked to be left alone did not violate the First Amendment. The District Court had issued its opinion in Bray. In light of Bray, the District Court dismissed the respondents' § 1985(3) claim, and the Supreme Court found adequate basis remaining to support the injunction.

=== Christian Legal Soc. Chapter v. Martinez ===
Christian Legal Soc. Chapter v. Martinez, 561 U.S. 661 (2010) addressed the question of whether a public university could deny official recognition and the use of school funds and facilities to a student group that refused to open membership and leadership to all students. The CLS chapter had contended that it does not exclude individuals because of sexual orientation, but rather “on the basis of a conjunction of conduct and the belief that the conduct is not wrong.” The court held that the university's policy was a reasonable viewpoint-neutral condition on access to the student-organization forum. Bray was cited as an example of a prior decision that had declined to distinguish between status and conduct in the context of unequal treatment, quoting Justice Scalia's example that "A tax on wearing yarmulkes is a tax on Jews."

=== Dobbs v. Jackson Women's Health Organization ===
Dobbs v. Jackson Women's Health Organization, 597 U.S. ___ (2022) declined to find a right to abortion under the Fourteenth Amendment’s Equal Protection Clause, quoting Bray's finding that the “...goal of preventing abortion” does not constitute “invidiously discriminatory animus” against women that would be subject to heightened scrutiny.
