= Soldal v. Cook County =

- Supreme Court of the United States

Argued October 5, 1992 Decided December 8, 1992
- Full case name: Edward Soldal, et ux., Petitioners v. Cook County, Illinois, et al.
- Citations: 506 U.S. 56 (more) 113 S. Ct. 538; 121 L. Ed. 2d 450; 1992 U.S. LEXIS 7835; 61 U.S.L.W. 4019; 92 Cal. Daily Op. Service 9794; 92 Daily Journal DAR 16378; 6 Fla. L. Weekly Fed. S 769

Case history
- Prior: summ. judg. for defend., (N.D. Ill. 1990); affirmed, 923 F.2d 1241 (7th Cir. 1991); affirmed en banc, 942 F.2d 1073 (7th Cir. 1991); cert. granted, 503 U.S. 918 (1992).

Holding
- Fourth Amendment protects both property and privacy interests. Even absent a search or an arrest, a seizure of property implicates the Fourth Amendment, which applies to seizures made either in a civil context or in a criminal context.

Court membership
- Chief Justice William Rehnquist Associate Justices Byron White · Harry Blackmun; John P. Stevens · Sandra Day O'Connor; Antonin Scalia · Anthony Kennedy; David Souter · Clarence Thomas

Case opinion
- Majority: White, joined by unanimous

Laws applied
- U.S. Const. Amends. IV, XIV; Illinois Forcible Entry and Detainer Act

Soldal v. Cook County, 506 U.S. 56 (1992), was a United States Supreme Court case in which the Court held that a seizure of property like that which occurs during an eviction, even absent a search or an arrest, implicates the Fourth Amendment. The Court also held that the Amendment protects property as well as privacy interests, in both criminal as well as civil contexts. Finally, saying that "certain wrongs affect more than a single right", the Court left open the possibility that the Fourteenth Amendment's protections against deprivation of property without due process of law may also be implicated.

== Background ==
Plaintiffs Edward and Mary Soldal and family owned a mobile home, and lived on a lot of land that they were renting in a trailer park in Elk Grove, Illinois. In August 1987, Terrace Properties, the owner of the park, filed suit to evict the Soldals, and a court hearing was scheduled. Two weeks before the hearing, however, the park manager called the Cook County sheriff's office and told them that she was planning to evict a family on that day, and requested the presence of deputy sheriffs, fearing that Soldal might resist being evicted. Such so-called "self-help evictions" (without a court order to evict) are illegal in many states, including Illinois.

The right against unreasonable seizures would be no less transgressed if the seizure of the house was undertaken to collect evidence, verify compliance with a housing regulation, effect an eviction by the police, or on a whim, for no reason at all.

— Justice Byron White, Soldal v. Cook County

That afternoon, two Terrace employees, accompanied by a deputy sheriff, began wrenching the sewer and water boxes off the side of the mobile home, causing damage to it. When Soldal approached, the deputy sheriff said that he "was there to see that [Soldal] didn't interfere with the workers." The workers disconnected the phone, tore off the skirting and canopy of the trailer, and hooked a tractor to it. Soldal called his lawyer, who called the sheriff's office – which at first denied that there was any deputy sheriff on the scene. When Soldal returned to the scene, two more deputy sheriffs had arrived. He demanded that they file a criminal complaint against Terrace, and they referred him to their lieutenant, who was meeting with the manager in her office. After making Soldal wait outside for nearly a half-hour, the lieutenant came out and told Soldal to talk to the states attorney, then went back inside. After another half-hour, he told Soldal that he would not accept his complaint because "it was between landlord and tenant." Yet another two deputies arrived, and the workers pulled the trailer free of its moorings and towed it onto the street.

Five days later, the judge who had been scheduled to hear the eviction case ruled that the one just described was unlawful, and ordered the home returned to the lot. The home, however, was badly damaged. Soldal brought an action under the Civil Rights Act of 1871, codified as 42 U.S.C. § 1983, alleging a violation of their civil rights under the Fourth Amendment and Fourteenth Amendment. The named defendants were Terrace Properties (the manager of the park) together with several Cook County deputy sheriffs and the Cook County State's Attorney. Soldal alleged a conspiracy to unreasonably seize and remove the family's trailer home. However, the District Judge granted the defendants' motion for summary judgment, on the grounds that the Soldals had failed to cite any evidence to support their conspiracy theory. Without that, a "state action" – which is fundamental to claims arising under § 1983 – was non-existent.

=== Appeal ===
At appeal, a panel of three judges split 2–1 to affirm the dismissal. On rehearing, a majority of the Seventh Circuit, sitting en banc with a full complement of 11 judges, reaffirmed the panel decision by a narrow 6–5 margin. This time the Court found that while the deputies did not actively participate in the eviction, their presence did prevent Soldal from exercising his common law right to use reasonable force to protect his home from private action – an action that the officers knew (or should have known) to be illegal. At face value, therefore, the appeals court accepted Soldal's contention that all defendants, public and private, were acting together in conspiracy (e.g., to get rid of a pesky tenant), and that all of them were acting "under color of state law".

However, citing the existence of adequate legal remedies for an illegal eviction – "state remedies if they are adequate, a federal remedy under the due process clause if not" – the Appeals Court was loath to "bend" the Fourth Amendment into yet another remedy. "Bent it would have to be, because the amendment was never intended to regulate garden-variety commercial disputes of the sort involved in this case."

While acknowledging that a "seizure" had occurred in the literal sense, they found that no "search" had occurred – nobody ever entered the home, or conducted an investigation seeking to make an arrest, or invaded "private space" under a law enforcement context. They feared that using the literal interpretation of "seizure" to "make every repossession and eviction with police assistance actionable under – of all things – the Fourth Amendment would both trivialize the amendment and gratuitously shift a large body of routine commercial litigation from the state courts to the federal courts."

The Appeals Court reasoned that "the police did, of course, take Soldal's home away, and that was a grave deprivation. But it was a deprivation purely of property; there was no invasion of the Soldals' privacy." Therefore, they concluded, no seizure had occurred, at least not in the context of the Fourth Amendment. Saying that the Soldals may have prevailed had they brought their claim under the Due Process Clause of the Fourteenth Amendment instead of under the Fourth Amendment, the Appeals Court finished by saying that "the Soldals, to repeat, had remedies; they chose the wrong one."

== Supreme Court ==
Soldal next petitioned the Supreme Court for a writ of certiorari, and for leave to proceed in forma pauperis, both of which were granted on March 9, 1992.

=== Questions presented ===
- Is a repossession or eviction that is conducted or assisted by state officers actionable under the Fourth Amendment?
- Can there be a 'seizure' without a 'search'? In other words, must there be an infringement of privacy rights before property rights can implicate the Fourth Amendment?
- Does the right to be free of unreasonable seizure apply only in the criminal context, or does it apply in the civil context as well?

=== The ruling ===
In their unanimous ruling, the Supreme Court Justices said, "As a result of the state action in this case, the Soldals' domicile was not only seized, it literally was carried away, giving new meaning to the term 'mobile home'." The Court emphatically disagreed with the Appeals Court, and found that:

- The Fourth Amendment protects both property as well as privacy interests.
- Even absent a search or an arrest, a seizure of property implicates the Fourth Amendment.
- The Fourth Amendment applies not only to seizures made within a criminal context, but also to those made within a civil context as well.

The case was reversed and remanded.

==== Privacy rights vs. property rights ====
The Fourth Amendment to the U.S. Constitution (made applicable to the States by the Fourteenth Amendment), provides that:

The right of the people to be secure in their persons, houses, papers, and effects, against unreasonable searches and seizures, shall not be violated....

As was defined by United States v. Jacobsen, the first Clause of the Fourth Amendment:

protects two types of expectations, one involving 'searches', the other 'seizures'. A search occurs when an expectation of privacy that society is prepared to consider reasonable is infringed. A seizure of property occurs where there is some meaningful interference with an individual's possessory interests in that property.

The Fourth Amendment proscribes unreasonable seizure of any person, or of any person's home (including its curtilage) or personal property without a warrant. Although much of the recent body of Fourth Amendment cases have turned on privacy issues, there is nothing in the case law that says that a seizure must invoke a privacy concern in order to implicate the Fourth Amendment. In fact, the Amendment protects both property and privacy, both together and separately.

==== Seizures without invasion of privacy? ====
In United States v. Place, although the Court found that subjecting luggage to a "dog sniff" did not constitute a search for Fourth Amendment purposes because it did not compromise any privacy interest, they also found that taking custody of Place's suitcase was deemed an unlawful seizure, for it unreasonably infringed upon "the suspect's possessory interest in his luggage." Although lacking a privacy component, the property rights in both instances nonetheless were not disregarded, but rather were afforded Fourth Amendment protection.

Likewise, Soldal's possessory interest in his home must be protected. The Court held that:

In our view, the reason why an officer might enter a house or effectuate a seizure is wholly irrelevant to the threshold question whether the Amendment applies. What matters is the intrusion on the people's security from governmental interference. Therefore, the right against unreasonable seizures would be no less transgressed if the seizure of the house was undertaken to collect evidence, verify compliance with a housing regulation, effect an eviction by the police, or on a whim, for no reason at all.

What is more, the Court reasoned, their decisions involving the "plain view doctrine" go against the notion that the Fourth Amendment proscribes unreasonable seizures of property only where privacy or liberty is also implicated. Suppose, for example, that police officers lawfully enter a house, by either complying with the warrant requirement or satisfying one of its recognized exceptions (e.g., through a valid consent or a showing of exigent circumstances) — If they come across some item in plain view and seize it, no invasion of personal privacy has occurred. If the boundaries of the Fourth Amendment were defined exclusively by rights of privacy, "plain view" seizures would not implicate that constitutional provision at all. To the contrary, however, the existing case law surrounding plain view seizures shows that such cases have been scrupulously subjected to Fourth Amendment inquiry.

==== Criminal vs. civil context ====
The Court took issue with the inference of the Appeals Court that different rules apply, depending on whether a seizure takes place within a criminal context or a civil context. The court dismissed this theory, as they have before, saying that it is "anomalous to say that the individual and his private property are fully protected by the Fourth Amendment only when the individual is suspected of criminal behavior."

==== 'Dominant character' of a claim? ====
The Court also dismissed the lower court's theory that the Soldal's claim was more akin to a Fourteenth Amendment challenge against the deprivation of property without due process of law than against an unreasonable seizure, and therefore the Soldal's should not be allowed to bring their suit under the guise of the Fourth Amendment. To that, the Court said:

Certain wrongs affect more than a single right and, accordingly, can implicate more than one of the Constitution's commands. Where such multiple violations are alleged, we are not in the habit of identifying as a preliminary matter the claim's "dominant" character. Rather, we examine each constitutional provision in turn.

==== Floodgates? ====
Responding to the lower court's fears about transferring cases involving routine repossessions and evictions into the Federal Court system, the Court instructed that "reasonableness is still the ultimate standard" under the Fourth Amendment. Saying that "we doubt that the police will often choose to further an enterprise knowing that it is contrary to the law", the Court rejected the notion that this case will unleash a wave of new litigation.

== See also ==
- Summary process
- Eviction
- Self-help
- Repossession
- United States v. Jones (2012)
- Florida v. Jardines
