= Spectrum Sports, Inc. v. McQuillan =

- Supreme Court of the United States

Argued November 10, 1992 Decided January 25, 1993
- Full case name: Spectrum Sports, Inc., et al v. Shirley McQuillan, et vir, DBA Sorboturf Enterprises
- Citations: 506 U.S. 447 (more) 113 S. Ct. 884; 122 L. Ed. 2d 247; 1993 U.S. LEXIS 1013
- Argument: Oral argument

Case history
- Prior: McQuillan v. Sorbothane, Inc., 907 F.2d 154 (9th Cir. 1990); cert. granted, 503 U.S. 958 (1992).
- Subsequent: On remand, McQuillan v. Sorbothane, Inc., 23 F.3d 1531 (9th Cir. 1994)

Holding
- Spectrum Sports may not be liable for attempted monopolization under § 2 absent proof of a dangerous probability that they would monopolize a relevant market and specific intent to monopolize.

Court membership
- Chief Justice William Rehnquist Associate Justices Byron White · Harry Blackmun; John P. Stevens · Sandra Day O'Connor; Antonin Scalia · Anthony Kennedy; David Souter · Clarence Thomas

Case opinion
- Majority: White, joined by unanimous

Laws applied
- Sherman Antitrust Act, Clayton Act

Spectrum Sports, Inc. v. McQuillan, 506 U.S. 447 (1993), was a case in which the Supreme Court of the United States rejected the assertion that attempted monopolization may be proven merely by demonstration of unfair or predatory conduct. Instead, conduct of a single firm could be held to be unlawful attempted monopolization only when it actually monopolized or dangerously threatened to do so. Thus, the Court rejected the conclusion that injury to competition could be presumed to follow from certain conduct. The causal link must be demonstrated.

== Background ==
Defendants held the patent to a polymer used in athletic goods. Plaintiff distributor refused to sell its right to develop goods made from the material, so that it could retain its rights to manufacture equestrian products. Defendants appointed another distributor.

Plaintiff brought suit, claiming violations of the Sherman Act and Clayton Act, 15 U.S.C.S. §§ 2 and 3, the Racketeer Influenced and Corrupt Organizations Act, 18 U.S.C.S. § 1962, and state unfair practices law.

The trial court found defendants liable for attempted monopolization and denied their motions for judgment notwithstanding the verdict and for a new trial. The Ninth Circuit affirmed.

Defendants appealed, claiming that plaintiffs failed to prove the elements of attempted monopolization. Defendants claimed reversal was required where defendants' specific intent to monopolize was not proven.

== Held ==
The Supreme Court reversed, holding the trial court erred in finding evidence of unfair or predatory conduct was sufficient to satisfy the specific intent and dangerous elements of the offense. Without proof of these elements or the relevant product market, liability could not attach. The judgment holding that defendants were liable for attempted monopolization under the Sherman Act, 15 U.S.C.S. § 2, was reversed absent proof of a dangerous probability that defendants would monopolize a particular market and a specific intent to monopolize. Intent could not be inferred by evidence of unfair or predatory conduct alone.

=== Reasoning ===
"Every other Court of Appeals has indicated that proving an attempt to monopolize requires proof of a dangerous probability of monopolization of a relevant market."

§2 of the Sherman Act addresses the actions of single firms that monopolize or attempt to monopolize, as well as conspiracies and combinations to monopolize. However, it does not define the elements of the offense of attempted monopolization. Nor is there much guidance to be had in the scant legislative history of that provision, which was added late in the legislative process. Rather, the legislative history indicates that much of the interpretation of the necessarily broad principles of the Act was to be left for the courts in particular cases.

When in 1905 the Supreme Court first addressed the meaning of attempt to monopolize under § 2, it wrote as follows:

Where acts are not sufficient in themselves to produce a result which the law seeks to prevent—for instance, the monopoly—but require further acts in addition to the mere forces of nature to bring that result to pass, an intent to bring it to pass is necessary in order to produce a dangerous probability that it will happen. Commonwealth v. Peaslee, 177 Massachusetts 267, 272 [59 N.E. 55, 56 (1901) ]. But when that intent and the consequent dangerous probability exist, this statute, like many others and like the common law in some cases, directs itself against that dangerous probability as well as against the completed result.

The Court went on to explain, however, that not every act done with intent to produce an unlawful result constitutes an attempt. "It is a question of proximity and degree.". "Swift thus indicated that intent is necessary, but alone is not sufficient, to establish the dangerous probability of success that is the object of § 2's prohibition of attempts."

"The Court's decisions since Swift have reflected the view that the plaintiff charging attempted monopolization must prove a dangerous probability of actual monopolization, which has generally required a definition of the relevant market and examination of market power."

The Courts of Appeals other than the Ninth Circuit have followed this approach. It is generally required that to demonstrate attempted monopolization a plaintiff must prove:

(1) that the defendant has engaged in predatory or anticompetitive conduct with
(2) a specific intent to monopolize and
(3) a dangerous probability of achieving monopoly power."

"In order to determine whether there is a dangerous probability of monopolization, courts have found it necessary to consider the relevant market and the defendant's ability to lessen or destroy competition in that market."

==== Opposition to the Lessig opinion ====
The Supreme Court explained its opposition to the Lessig opinion:

We are not at all inclined, however, to embrace Lessig 's interpretation of § 2, for there is little if any support for it in the statute or the case law, and the notion that proof of unfair or predatory conduct alone is sufficient to make out the offense of attempted monopolization is contrary to the purpose and policy of the Sherman Act.

The Lessig opinion claimed support from the language of § 2, which prohibits attempts to monopolize "any part" of commerce, and therefore forbids attempts to monopolize any appreciable segment of interstate sales of the relevant product. The "any part" clause, however, applies to charges of monopolization as well as to attempts to monopolize, and it is beyond doubt that the former requires proof of market power in a relevant market.

In support of its determination that an inference of dangerous probability was permissible from a showing of intent, the Lessig opinion cited, and added emphasis to, this Court's reference in its opinion in Swift to "intent and the consequent dangerous probability." 327 F.2d, at 474, n. 46, quoting 196 U.S., at 396, 25 S.Ct., at 279. But any question whether dangerous probability of success requires proof of more than intent alone should have been removed by the subsequent passage in Swift which stated that "not every act that may be done with an intent to produce an unlawful result . . . constitutes an attempt. It is a question of proximity and degree." Id., at 402, 25 S.Ct., at 281.

The Lessig court also relied on a footnote in du Pont & Co., supra, 351 U.S., at 395, n. 23, 76 S.Ct., at 1008, n. 23, for the proposition that when the charge is attempt to monopolize, the relevant market is "not in issue." That footnote, which appeared in analysis of the relevant market issue in du Pont, rejected the Government's reliance on several cases, noting that "the scope of the market was not in issue" in Story Parchment Co. v. Paterson Parchment Paper Co., 282 U.S. 555, 51 S.Ct. 248, 75 L.Ed. 544 (1931). That reference merely reflected the fact that, in Story Parchment, which was not an attempt to monopolize case, the parties did not challenge the definition of the market adopted by the lower courts. Nor was du Pont itself concerned with the issue in this case.

It is also our view that Lessig and later Ninth Circuit decisions refining and applying it are inconsistent with the policy of the Sherman Act. The purpose of the Act is not to protect businesses from the working of the market; it is to protect the public from the failure of the market. The law directs itself not against conduct which is competitive, even severely so, but against conduct which unfairly tends to destroy competition itself. It does so not out of solicitude for private concerns but out of concern for the public interest. Thus, this Court and other courts have been careful to avoid constructions of § 2 which might chill competition, rather than foster it. It is sometimes difficult to distinguish robust competition from conduct with long-term anticompetitive effects; moreover, single-firm activity is unlike concerted activity covered by § 1, which "inherently is fraught with anticompetitive risk." Copperweld, 467 U.S., at 767-769, 104 S.Ct., at 2739-2740. For these reasons, § 2 makes the conduct of a single firm unlawful only when it actually monopolizes or dangerously threatens to do so. Id., at 767, 104 S.Ct., at 2739. The concern that § 2 might be applied so as to further anticompetitive ends is plainly not met by inquir ing only whether the defendant has engaged in "unfair" or "predatory" tactics. Such conduct may be sufficient to prove the necessary intent to monopolize, which is something more than an intent to compete vigorously, but demonstrating the dangerous probability of monopolization in an attempt case also requires inquiry into the relevant product and geographic market and the defendant's economic power in that market.

== See also ==
- List of United States Supreme Court cases, volume 506
- Brooke Group Ltd. v. Brown & Williamson Tobacco Corp., 509 U.S. 209 (1993)
