= Hale v. Henkel =

- Supreme Court of the United States

Argued January 4–5, 1906 Decided March 12, 1906
- Full case name: Edwin F. Hale, Appt., v. William Henkel, United States Marshall
- Citations: 201 U.S. 43 (more) 26 S. Ct. 370; 50 L. Ed. 652

Case history
- Prior: Appeal from the Circuit Court of the United States for the southern District of New York

Holding
- A federal grand jury engaged in an investigation into corporate malfeasance can require the corporation in question to surrender its records.

Court membership
- Chief Justice Melville Fuller Associate Justices John M. Harlan · David J. Brewer; Henry B. Brown · Edward D. White; Rufus W. Peckham · Joseph McKenna; Oliver W. Holmes Jr. · William R. Day

Case opinions
- Majority: Brown, joined by Harlan, White, Peckham, McKenna, Holmes, Day
- Concurrence: Harlan
- Concurrence: McKenna
- Dissent: Brewer, joined by Fuller

Laws applied
- U.S. Const. amends. IV, V

Hale v. Henkel, 201 U.S. 43 (1906), was a major United States Supreme Court case in which the Court established the power of a federal grand jury engaged in an investigation into corporate malfeasance to require the corporation in question to surrender its records.

== Facts ==
Edwin F. Hale, the petitioner, was the treasurer of MacAndrews and Forbes. Founded in 1850, MacAndrews and Forbes was one of six companies that were under investigation for price fixing of tobacco, in violation of the Sherman Act.

In 1906, US government prosecutors served a grand jury subpoena on Hale that demanded him to testify and turn over corporate documents. Hale appeared before the jury but refused to reply to questions or to produce documents. On his company's behalf, he invoked the Fifth Amendment privilege and was held in contempt. Hale then hired a lawyer and filed a lawsuit, which ultimately came before the Supreme Court.

Hale's argument was that a grand jury cannot require persons representing corporations to testify or demand them to produce documents unless the charges that are being investigated are first explained.

The defendant of record in the case was William Henkel, US Marshal.

== Judgment ==
In a majority opinion written by Justice Henry B. Brown, the Court rejected Hale's argument by maintaining that a grand jury can examine witnesses and demand documentary evidence in connection with a probe into possible crimes, even if it did not identify the scope of its investigation. The Court then rejected Hale's privilege claim by ruling that the self-incrimination privilege provided to citizens by the Fifth Amendment did not apply to corporations. Brown J said the following:

If, whenever an officer or employee of a corporation were summoned before a grand jury as a witness, he could refuse to produce the books and documents of such corporation upon the ground that they would incriminate the corporation itself, it would result in the failure of a large number of cases where the illegal combination was determinable only upon the examination of such papers. Conceding that the witness was an officer of the corporation under investigation, and that he was entitled to assert the rights of corporation with respect to the production of its books and papers, we are of the opinion that there is a clear distinction in this particular between an individual and a corporation, and that the latter has no right to refuse to submit its books and papers for an examination at the suit of the State. The individual may stand upon his constitutional rights as a citizen. He is entitled to carry on his private business in his own way. His power to contract is unlimited. He owes no duty to the State or to his neighbors to divulge his business, or to open his doors to an investigation, so far as it may tend to criminate him. He owes no such duty to the State, since he receives nothing therefrom beyond the protection of his life and property. His rights are such as existed by the law of the land long antecedent to the organization of the State, and can only be taken from him by due process of law, and in accordance with the Constitution. Among his rights are a refusal to incriminate himself and the immunity of himself and his property from arrest or seizure except under a warrant of the law. He owes nothing to the public so long as he does not trespass upon their rights.

Upon the other hand, the corporation is a creature of the State. It is presumed to be incorporated for the benefit of the public. It receives certain special privileges and franchises, and holds them subject to the laws of the State and the limitations of its charter. Its powers are limited by law. It can make no contract not authorized by its charter. Its rights to act as a corporation are only preserved to it so long as it obeys the laws of its creation. There is a reserved right in the legislature to investigate its contracts and find out whether it has exceeded its powers. It would be a strange anomaly to hold that a State, having chartered a corporation to make use of certain franchises, could not, in the exercise of its sovereignty, inquire how these franchises had been employed, and whether they had been abused, and demand the production of the corporate books and papers for that purpose. The defense amounts to this: that an officer of a corporation which is charged with a criminal violation of the statute may plead the criminality of such corporation as a refusal to produce its books. To state this proposition is to answer it. While an individual may lawfully refuse to answer incriminating questions unless protected by an immunity statute, it does not follow that a corporation, vested with special privileges and franchises, may refuse to show its hand when charged with an abuse of such privileges.

...

The individual may stand upon his constitutional rights as a citizen. He is entitled to carry on his private business in his own way. His power to contract is unlimited. He owes no duty to the State or to his neighbors to divulge his business, or to open his doors to an investigation, so far as it may tend to criminate [sic] him. He owes no such duty to the State, since he receives nothing therefrom beyond the protection of his life and property. His rights are such as existed by the law of the land long antecedent to the organization of the State, and can only be taken from him by due process of law, and in accordance with the Constitution. Among his rights are a refusal to incriminate himself and the immunity of himself and his property from arrest or seizure except under a warrant of the law. He owes nothing to the public so long as he does not trespass upon their rights."

== Significance ==
The Court's subsequent ruling in Wilson v. United States (1911) built upon Hale v. Henkel by prohibiting corporate officers from invoking their own personal Fifth Amendment privilege against self-incrimination to justify a failure to turn over corporate documents. Such a use of the Fifth Amendment privilege, according to the Court, would inhibit the state's visitatorial rights over corporations. Later Supreme Court decisions applied the principle established in Hale v. Henkel to unions (United States v. White (1944)), partnerships (Bellis v. United States (1974)), and sole proprietorships (United States v. Doe (1984)). The cases have reflected the Court's consistent view that the Fifth Amendment privilege should apply to only individual human beings, not artificial entities.

On the other hand, the ruling in Citizens United v. Federal Election Commission (2010) granted corporations an unfettered right of political free speech, and Burwell v. Hobby Lobby (2014) recognized corporations' religious liberties. One observer has described these two most recent rulings as "underscoring a deep rift on the Roberts court about the permissible (or desirable) extent of corporate personhood under the Bill of Rights."

== See also ==
- List of United States Supreme Court cases, volume 201
- List of United States Supreme Court cases
- Lists of United States Supreme Court cases by volume
- List of United States Supreme Court cases by the Fuller Court
