= Rice v. Norman Williams Co. =

- Supreme Court of the United States

Argued April 21, 1982 Decided July 1, 1982
- Full case name: Rice, Director, Department of Alcoholic Beverage Control of California v. Norman Williams Company, et al.; Bohemian Distributing Co. v. Norman Williams Co. et al.; Wine & Spirits Wholesalers of California v. Norman Williams Co. et al.
- Citations: 458 U.S. 654 (more) 102 S. Ct. 3294; 73 L. Ed. 2d 1042; 1982 U.S. LEXIS 156; 50 U.S.L.W. 5052; 1982-2 Trade Cas. (CCH) ¶ 64,816; Fed. Sec. L. Rep. (CCH) ¶ 64,816

Case history
- Prior: Norman Williams Co. v. Rice, 108 Cal. App. 3d 348, 166 Cal. Rptr. 563 (App. 3d Dist. 1980); cert. granted, 454 U.S. 1080 (1981).

Holding
- The Sherman Act did not invalidate a California law prohibiting the importing of spirits not authorized by the brand owner.

Court membership
- Chief Justice Warren E. Burger Associate Justices William J. Brennan Jr. · Byron White; Thurgood Marshall · Harry Blackmun; Lewis F. Powell Jr. · William Rehnquist; John P. Stevens · Sandra Day O'Connor

Case opinions
- Majority: Rehnquist, joined by Burger, Brennan, Marshall, Blackmun, Powell, O'Connor
- Concurrence: Stevens, joined by White

Laws applied
- Sherman Antitrust Act

Rice v. Norman Williams Co., 458 U.S. 654 (1982), was a decision of the U.S. Supreme Court involving the preemption of state law by the Sherman Act. The Supreme Court held, in a 9–0 decision, that the Sherman Act did not invalidate a California law prohibiting the importing of spirits not authorized by the brand owner.

== Background ==
The case involved a statute which provided that a licensed importer, through whom alone alcoholic beverages could be brought into California, "shall not purchase or accept delivery of any brand of distilled spirits unless he is designated as an authorized importer of such brand by the brand owner or his authorized agent." Calif. Bus. & Prof. Code § 23672 (Supp. 1984). The California laws required that importers of alcoholic beverages be licensed, and allowing only importers designated by a particular distiller to import that distiller's products into the state.

The California Court of Appeal for the Third District held that the statute was per se illegal under the Sherman Act and thus was invalid on its face.

== Opinion of the Court ==
The Court rejected due process and equal protection challenges to the California laws. The Court rejected the former claim because the importers challenging the statute had no liberty or property interest in obtaining a distiller's permission to import, and because due process did not authorize it to assess the wisdom of economic regulations. The Court rejected an equal protection challenge to the statute's distinction between designated and nondesignated importers because that restriction on intrabrand competition was rationally related to the state's interest in promoting interbrand competition. The statute may have enhanced interbrand competition because it enabled distillers to control which wholesalers could import their products into the state.

The Supreme Court set out two separate and distinct analyses to be made before preemption by Section 1 can be found.

First, a court must decide whether the statute contemplates conduct that will always violate Section 1.
If so, the statute is preempted unless the statutory conduct is determined, under the second analysis, to be state action (under the State action immunity doctrine)

The majority of the Court, in an opinion by Justice Rehnquist, held that a California Alcoholic Beverage statute was not preempted by the Sherman Act and that therefore state action analysis was not required to determine the validity of the statute. The Court reconciled Midcal with this shift in emphasis by observing that the California statute in question in Midcal "mandated resale price maintenance, an activity that has long been regarded as a per se violation of the Sherman Act." This observation implies that the statute found to be lacking active state supervision in Midcal and incapable of being shielded by Parker immunity also would have been preempted by the Sherman Act, thus leading to the same result.

Justice Rehnquist began his opinion for the Court by laying down the governing standards, 458 U.S. at 659:

As in the typical pre-emption case, the inquiry is whether there exists an irreconcilable conflict between the federal and state regulatory schemes. The existence of a hypothetical or potential conflict is insufficient to warrant the pre-emption of the state statute. A state regulatory scheme is not pre-empted by the federal antitrust laws simply be-cause in a hypothetical situation a private party's compliance with the statute might cause him to violate the antitrust laws. A state statute is not pre-empted by the federal antitrust laws simply be-cause the state scheme might have an anti-competitive effect.

He then characterized Midcal as involving a statute that required members of the California wine industry "to file fair trade contracts or price schedules with the State, and provided that if a wine producer had not set prices through a fair trade contract, wholesalers must post a resale price schedule for that producer's brands." Id. (emphasis in original). The Midcal Court had held that "the statute facially conflicted with the Sherman Act because it mandated resale price maintenance, an activity that has long been regarded as a per se violation of the Sherman Act." Id. at 659-60 (emphasis in original). After referring to Joseph E. Seagram & Sons, Inc. v. Hostetter, 384 U.S. 35, he elaborated as follows, 458 U.S. at 661:

Our decisions in this area instruct us, therefore, that a state statute, when considered in the abstract, may be condemned under the antitrust laws only if it mandates or authorizes conduct that necessarily constitutes a violation of the antitrust laws in all cases, or if it places irresistible pressure on a private party to violate the antitrust laws in order to comply with the statute. Such condemnation will follow under § 1 of the Sherman Act when the conduct contemplated by the statute is in all cases a per se violation. If the activity addressed by the statute does not fall into that category, and therefore must be analyzed under the rule of reason, the statute cannot be condemned in the abstract. Analysis under the rule of reason requires an examination of the circumstances underlying a particular economic practice, and therefore does not lend itself to a conclusion that a statute is facially inconsistent with federal antitrust laws.

Addressing the statute there challenged, he referred to the holding in Continental Television v. GTE Sylvania, 433 U.S. 36 (1977), that a manufacturer's use of vertical non-price restraints was not per se illegal but rather should be scrutinized under the rule of reason since "restraints on intrabrand competition may promote interbrand com-petition." 458 U.S. at 661. He regarded the California statute as merely enforcing "the distiller's decision to restrain intraband competition", leaving him free to designate as few or as many licensed importers as he pleased. Id. The statute thus was not facially invalid, although "the manner in which a distiller utilizes the designation statute and the arrangements a distiller makes with its wholesalers will be subject to Sherman Act analysis under the rule of reason", id. at 662-63 n.9, that because of the Court's resolution of the preemption issue, it was not necessary "to consider whether the statute may be saved from invalidation under the doctrine of Parker v. Brown, 317 U.S. 341 (1943), or under the Twenty-first Amendment."

Norman Williams implies that a state statute can have an anticompetitive effect and still be upheld; it will not be preempted by the Sherman Act unless "there exists an irreconcilable conflict between federal and state regulatory schemes. The existence of a hypothetical or potential conflict is insufficient to warrant the preemption of the state statute." In attempting to define the threshold of preemption better, the Court concluded that a state statute "may be condemned under the antitrust laws only if it mandates or authorizes conduct that necessarily constitutes a violation of the antitrust laws in all cases, or if it places irresistible pressure on a private party to violate the antitrust laws in order to comply with the statute." As an example of the type of statute that would be preempted, the Court pointed out that the statute challenged in Midcal, whereby the state enforced retail prices set by producers, had a "pernicious effect on competition and lack[ed] ... any redeeming virtue," thus requiring preemption by the Sherman Act.

=== Excerpts ===
- [A] state statute, when considered in the abstract, may be condemned under the antitrust laws only if it mandates or authorizes conduct that necessarily constitutes a violation of the antitrust laws in all cases, or if it places irresistible pressure on a private party to violate the antitrust laws in order to comply with the statute. Such condemnation will follow under § 1 of the Sherman Act when the conduct contemplated by the statute is in all cases a per se violation. If the activity addressed by the statute does not fall into that category, and therefore must be analyzed under the rule of reason, the statute cannot be condemned in the abstract.

- Analysis under the rule of reason requires an examination of the circumstances underlying a particular economic practice, and therefore does not lend itself to a conclusion that a statute is facially inconsistent with federal antitrust laws." 102 S. Ct. 3294, 3300 (1982).

- A party may successfully enjoin the enforcement of a state statute only if the statute on its face irreconcilably conflicts with federal antitrust policy." Id.. at 3299. A motion picture licensing act will thus be facially invalid "only if it mandates or authorizes conduct that necessarily constitutes a violation of the antitrust laws in all cases, or if it places irresistible pressure on a party to violate the antitrust laws in order to comply with the statute ... [T]he conduct contemplated by the statute [must] in all cases [be] a per se violation." Id. at 3300.
