= Commissioner v. Soliman =

- Supreme Court of the United States

Argued October 5, 1992 Decided January 12, 1993
- Full case name: Commissioner of Internal Revenue v. Nader E. Soliman
- Citations: 506 U.S. 168 (more) 113 S.Ct. 701; 121 L. Ed. 2d 634; 1993 U.S. LEXIS 828

Case history
- Prior: Soliman v. Commissioner, 94 T.C. 20 (1990); affirmed, 935 F.2d 52 (4th Cir. 1991); cert. granted, 503 U.S. 935 (1992).

Holding
- All locations where the taxpayer works must be compared and only one of those places will be considered the principal place of business.

Court membership
- Chief Justice William Rehnquist Associate Justices Byron White · Harry Blackmun; John P. Stevens · Sandra Day O'Connor; Antonin Scalia · Anthony Kennedy; David Souter · Clarence Thomas

Case opinions
- Majority: Kennedy, joined by Rehnquist, White, Blackmun, O'Connor, Souter
- Concurrence: Blackmun
- Concurrence: Thomas, joined by Scalia
- Dissent: Stevens

Laws applied
- Internal Revenue Code § 280A(c)(1)(A)

Commissioner v. Soliman, 506 U.S. 168 (1993), was a case heard before the United States Supreme Court in which the court decided whether a portion of a dwelling unit exclusively used as a principal place of business for any trade or business of a taxpayer would allow a deduction to the taxpayer's income taxes under Internal Revenue Code Section 280A(c)(1)(A).

== Background ==
Soliman was an anesthesiologist who spent thirty to thirty-five hours per week with patients at three different hospitals but none of the hospitals provided him with an office. He used a spare bedroom in his house for contacting patients and surgeons, maintaining billing records, preparing for treatments, and reading medical journals.

== Decision ==
The Supreme Court denied Soliman's home office deduction setting forth a two consideration test for whether the home was the taxpayer's principal place of business: (1) the relative importance of the activities performed, and (2) time spent at each place.

== Legislative reaction ==
Congress's reaction to this decision was to amend Section 280A(c) in the Taxpayer Relief Act of 1997 so that a home office could meet the "principal place of business" test if it is the only fixed location where administrative or management activities are performed. This effectively nullified the Supreme Court's decision ruling in the Soliman case.

== See also ==
- List of United States Supreme Court cases, volume 506
