= State law =

State law refers to the law of a federated state, as distinguished from the law of the federation of which it is a part. It is used when the constituent components of a federation are themselves called states. Federations made up of provinces, cantons, or other units use analogous terms like provincial law or cantonal law.

State law may refer to:

- State law (Australia)
- State law (Brazil)
- State law (Germany)
- State law (India)
- State law (Mexico)
- State law (Nigeria)
- State law (United States)
- State law (Venezuela)

== See also ==
- State act (disambiguation)
