= Martin v. District of Columbia Court of Appeals =

- Supreme Court of the United States

Decided November 2, 1992
- Full case name: Martin v. District of Columbia Court of Appeals
- Docket no.: 92-5584
- Citations: 506 U.S. 1 (more) 113 S. Ct. 397; 121 L. Ed. 2d 305

Holding
- The Supreme Court can declare that an indigent petitioner is not entitled to file non-criminal certiorari petitions for free when the petitioner has previously filed many frivolous petitions for free.

Court membership
- Chief Justice William Rehnquist Associate Justices Byron White · Harry Blackmun; John P. Stevens · Sandra Day O'Connor; Antonin Scalia · Anthony Kennedy; David Souter · Clarence Thomas

Case opinions
- Per curiam
- Dissent: Stevens, joined by Blackmun

Martin v. District of Columbia Court of Appeals, 506 U.S. 1 (1992), was a US Supreme Court opinion denying a petition for motion to proceed in forma pauperis, as the petitioner had repeatedly abused the process. Specifically, the Court prohibited the petitioner from filing further non-criminal in forma pauperis petitions, and that all petitions filed must be compliant with Court rules and must have had the filing fee paid. The dissent, written by Justice Stevens, argued that the result violated the "open access" of the Court.

The petitioner in the case, James Martin, was a serial abuser of the Court’s certiorari process; in the past decade following the Court's per curium opinion, Martin filed 45 petitions relating to being incarcerated for an unrelated offense, and the last 15 petitions for the prior two years were dismissed under the Court’s Rule 39.8. Although the case theoretically applies to only the Supreme Court itself and has no precedential effect in the lower courts decisions regarding indigent litigants, it has become a commonly cited procedural tool against certain abusive petitioners on the Supreme Court’s in forma pauperis docket - particularly those who repeatedly petition similar frivolous arguments within several years - averaging around 2-3 petitioners per order list.

The court used the Martin doctrine in many future cases, including Shieh v. Kakita and Brancato v. Gunn. The number of frivolous petitions required to justify this punishment is not particularly consistent.
