= Zafiro v. United States =

- Supreme Court of the United States

Decided January 25, 1993
- Full case name: Zafiro v. United States
- Citations: 506 U.S. 534 (more)

Holding
- Severance is not automatically required in every case where co-defendants desire to make mutually antagonistic defenses.

Court membership
- Chief Justice William Rehnquist Associate Justices Byron White · Harry Blackmun; John P. Stevens · Sandra Day O'Connor; Antonin Scalia · Anthony Kennedy; David Souter · Clarence Thomas

Zafiro v. United States, 506 U.S. 534 (1993), was a United States Supreme Court case in which the court held that severance is not automatically required in every case where co-defendants desire to make mutually antagonistic defenses. That is, a court is not required to split one trial with many defendants into many trials with one defendant each as soon as the defendants start arguing that their co-defendants are the ones at fault and vice versa. The defendants must show that one of their rights will be prejudiced unless the case is severed before severance is required. And, even if there is prejudice, it is possible that that may be cured with jury instructions rather than severance.

== Background ==
Defendants including Zafiro were indicted on federal drug charges and brought to trial together pursuant to Federal Rule of Criminal Procedure 8(b), which provides that defendants may be charged together "if they are alleged to have participated... in the same series of acts or transactions constituting... offenses." At various points during the proceeding, they each argued that their defenses were mutually antagonistic and moved for severance under Rule 14, which specifies that, "[i]f it appears that a defendant or the government is prejudiced by a joinder of... defendants... for trial... , the court may order an election or separate trials of counts, grant a severance of defendants or provide whatever relief justice requires." The federal District Court denied the motions, and each petitioner was convicted of various offenses. Although acknowledging other lower court cases saying that a severance is required when defendants present "mutually antagonistic defenses," the Seventh Circuit Court of Appeals found that petitioners had not suffered prejudice and affirmed the denial of severance.

== Opinion of the court ==
The Supreme Court issued an opinion on January 25, 1993.
