= Sherman Antitrust Act =

1890 U.S. anti-monopoly law

- Long title: An Act to protect trade and commerce against unlawful restraints and monopolies
- Enacted by: the 51st United States Congress

Citations
- Public law: Pub. L. 51–647
- Statutes at Large: 26 Stat. 209

Codification
- Titles amended: Title 15—Commerce and Trade
- U.S.C. sections created: 15 U.S.C. §§ 1–7

Legislative history
- Introduced in the Senate by John Sherman (R–OH); Passed the Senate on April 8, 1890 (52–1); Passed the House on June 20, 1890 (unanimous vote); Signed into law by President Benjamin Harrison on July 2, 1890

United States Supreme Court cases
- List: United States v. E.C. Knight Co., 156 U.S. 1 (1894); United States v. Trans-Missouri Freight Association, 166 U.S. 290 (1897); Northern Securities Co. v. United States, 193 U.S. 197 (1904); Hale v. Henkel, 201 U.S. 43 (1906); Dr. Miles Medical Co. v. John D. Park & Sons Co., 220 U.S. 373 (1911); Standard Oil Co. of New Jersey v. United States, 221 U.S. 1 (1911); United States v. American Tobacco Co., 221 U.S. 106 (1911); Federal Baseball Club v. National League, 259 U.S. 200 (1922); Apex Hosiery Co. v. Leader, 310 U.S. 469 (1940); United States v. Paramount Pictures, Inc., 334 U.S. 131 (1948); United States v. National City Lines, 334 U.S. 573 (1948); Kiefer-Stewart Co. v. Seagram & Sons, Inc., 340 U.S. 211 (1951); Lorain Journal Co. v. United States, 342 U.S. 143 (1951); Continental Television, Inc. v. GTE Sylvania, Inc., 433 U.S. 36 (1977); Arizona v. Maricopa County Medical Society, 457 U.S. 332 (1982); Jefferson Parish Hospital District No. 2 v. Hyde, 466 U.S. 2 (1984); Copperweld Corp. v. Independence Tube Corp., 467 U.S. 752 (1984); Spectrum Sports, Inc. v. McQuillan, 506 U.S. 447 (1993); Leegin Creative Leather Products, Inc. v. PSKS, Inc., 551 U.S. 877 (2007); Pacific Bell Telephone Co. v. linkLine Communications, Inc., 555 U.S. 438 (2009); American Needle, Inc. v. National Football League, 560 U.S. 183 (2010); North Carolina Bd. of Dental Examiners v. FTC, 574 U.S. 494 (2015); Ohio v. American Express Co., No. 16-1454, 585 U.S. ___ (2018); National Collegiate Athletic Assn. v. Alston, No. 20-512, 594 U.S. ___ (2021)

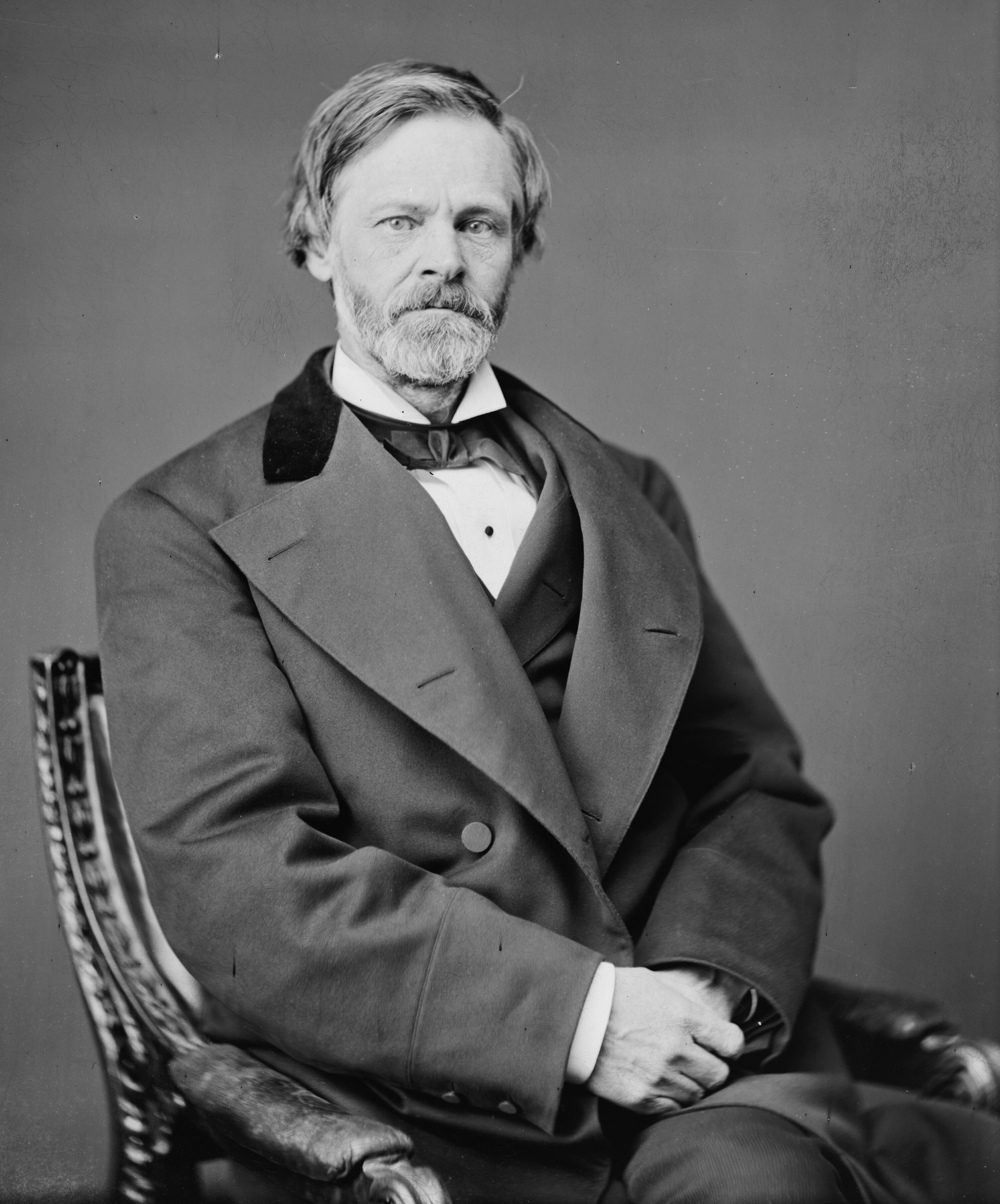
Sen. John Sherman (R–Ohio), the principal author of the Sherman Antitrust Act

The Sherman Antitrust Act (26 Stat. 209, 15 U.S.C. §§ 1–7) is a United States antitrust law which prescribes the rule of free competition among those engaged in commerce and consequently prohibits unfair monopolies. It was passed by Congress in 1890 and is named for Senator John Sherman, its principal author.

The Sherman Act broadly prohibits 1) anticompetitive agreements and 2) unilateral conduct that monopolizes or attempts to monopolize the relevant market. The Act authorizes the Department of Justice to bring suits to enjoin (i.e., prohibit) conduct violating the Act, and additionally authorizes private parties injured by conduct violating the Act to bring suits for treble damages (i.e. three times as much money in damages as the violation cost them). Over time, the federal courts have developed a body of law under the Sherman Act making certain types of anticompetitive conduct per se illegal, and subjecting other types of conduct to case-by-case analysis regarding whether the conduct unreasonably restrains trade.

The law attempts to prevent the artificial raising of prices by restriction of trade or supply. "Innocent monopoly," or monopoly achieved solely by merit, is legal, but acts by a monopolist to artificially preserve that status, or nefarious dealings to create a monopoly, are not. The purpose of the Sherman Act is not to protect competitors from harm from legitimately successful businesses, nor to prevent businesses from gaining honest profits from consumers, but rather to preserve a competitive marketplace to protect consumers from abuses.

== Background ==
In Spectrum Sports, Inc. v. McQuillan 506 U.S. 447 (1993) the Supreme Court said:

The purpose of the [Sherman] Act is not to protect businesses from the working of the market; it is to protect the public from the failure of the market. The law directs itself not against conduct which is competitive, even severely so, but against conduct which unfairly tends to destroy competition itself.

According to its authors, it was not intended to impact market gains obtained by honest means, by benefiting the consumers more than the competitors. Senator George Hoar of Massachusetts, another author of the Sherman Act, stated that "a man who merely by superior skill and intelligence [...] got the whole business because nobody could do it as well as he could was not a monopolist," but that it was monopoly if their business practices "made it impossible for other persons to engage in fair competition".

In 1937, the business Apex Hosiery suffered losses when strikers occupied their business, and prevented shipments of orders, including shipments to other states. Apex attempted to sue the union leader for treble damages as provided by the Sherman Act. Apex argued that the union had interfered with interstate commerce. The court held that the Sherman Act did not apply to the unlawful occupation of a business.

The Supreme Court stated in the case Apex Hosiery Co. v. Leader 310 U.S. 469, 310 U. S. 492-93 and n. 15:

The legislative history of the Sherman Act, as well as the decisions of this Court interpreting it, show that it was not aimed at policing interstate transportation or movement of goods and property. The legislative history and the voluminous literature which was generated in the course of the enactment and during fifty years of litigation of the Sherman Act give no hint that such was its purpose.

They do not suggest that, in general, state laws or law enforcement machinery were inadequate to prevent local obstructions or interferences with interstate transportation, or presented any problem requiring the interposition of federal authority. In 1890, when the Sherman Act was adopted, there were only a few federal statutes imposing penalties for obstructing or misusing interstate transportation. With an expanding commerce, many others have since been enacted safeguarding transportation in interstate commerce as the need was seen, including statutes declaring conspiracies to interfere or actual interference with interstate commerce by violence or threats of violence to be felonies.

The law was enacted in the era of "trusts" and of "combinations" of businesses and of capital organized and directed to control of the market by suppression of competition in the marketing of goods and services, the monopolistic tendency of which had become a matter of public concern. The goal was to prevent restraints of free competition in business and commercial transactions which tended to restrict production, raise prices, or otherwise control the market to the detriment of purchasers or consumers of goods and services, all of which had come to be regarded as a special form of public injury.

For that reason the phrase "restraint of trade," which, as will presently appear, had a well understood meaning in common law, was made the means of defining the activities prohibited. The addition of the words "or commerce among the several States" was not an additional kind of restraint to be prohibited by the Sherman Act, but was the means used to relate the prohibited restraint of trade to interstate commerce for constitutional purposes, Atlantic Cleaners & Dyers v. United States, 286 U. S. 427, 286 U. S. 434, so that Congress, through its commerce power, might suppress and penalize restraints on the competitive system which involved or affected interstate commerce. Because many forms of restraint upon commercial competition extended across state lines so as to make regulation by state action difficult or impossible, Congress enacted the Sherman Act, 21 Cong.Rec. 2456. It was in this sense of preventing restraints on commercial competition that Congress exercised "all the power it possessed." Atlantic Cleaners & Dyers v. United States, supra, 286 U. S. 435.

At Addyston Pipe and Steel Company v. United States, 85 F.2d 1, affirmed, 175 U. S. 175 U.S. 211;

At Standard Oil Co. of New Jersey v. United States, 221 U. S. 1, 221 U. S. 54-58.

== Provisions ==
=== Original text ===
The Sherman Act is divided into three sections. Section 1 delineates and prohibits specific means of anticompetitive conduct, while Section 2 deals with end results that are anti-competitive in nature. Thus, these sections supplement each other in an effort to prevent businesses from violating the spirit of the Act, while technically remaining within the letter of the law. Section 3 simply extends the provisions of Section 1 to U.S. territories and the District of Columbia.

Section 1:

Every contract, combination in the form of trust or otherwise, or conspiracy, in restraint of trade or commerce among the several States, or with foreign nations, is hereby declared to be illegal.

Section 2:

Every person who shall monopolize, or attempt to monopolize, or combine or conspire with any other person or persons, to monopolize any part of the trade or commerce among the several States, or with foreign nations, shall be deemed guilty of a misdemeanor [. . . ]

==== Subsequent legislation expanding its scope ====
The Clayton Antitrust Act, passed in 1914, proscribes certain additional activities that had been discovered to fall outside the scope of the Sherman Antitrust Act. The Clayton Antitrust Act added certain practices to the list of impermissible activities:

- price discrimination against competing companies
- conditioning sales on "exclusive dealing" agreements
- one person serving on the board of directors for two competing companies
- mergers and acquisitions that may significantly reduce market competition

The Clayton Antitrust Act specifically states that unions are exempt from this ruling.

The Robinson–Patman Act of 1936 amended the Clayton Act. The amendment proscribed certain anti-competitive practices in which manufacturers engaged in price discrimination against equally-situated distributors. For example, if a wholesale supplier sells products to a franchise at a price that is not available to a smaller business.

== Legacy ==
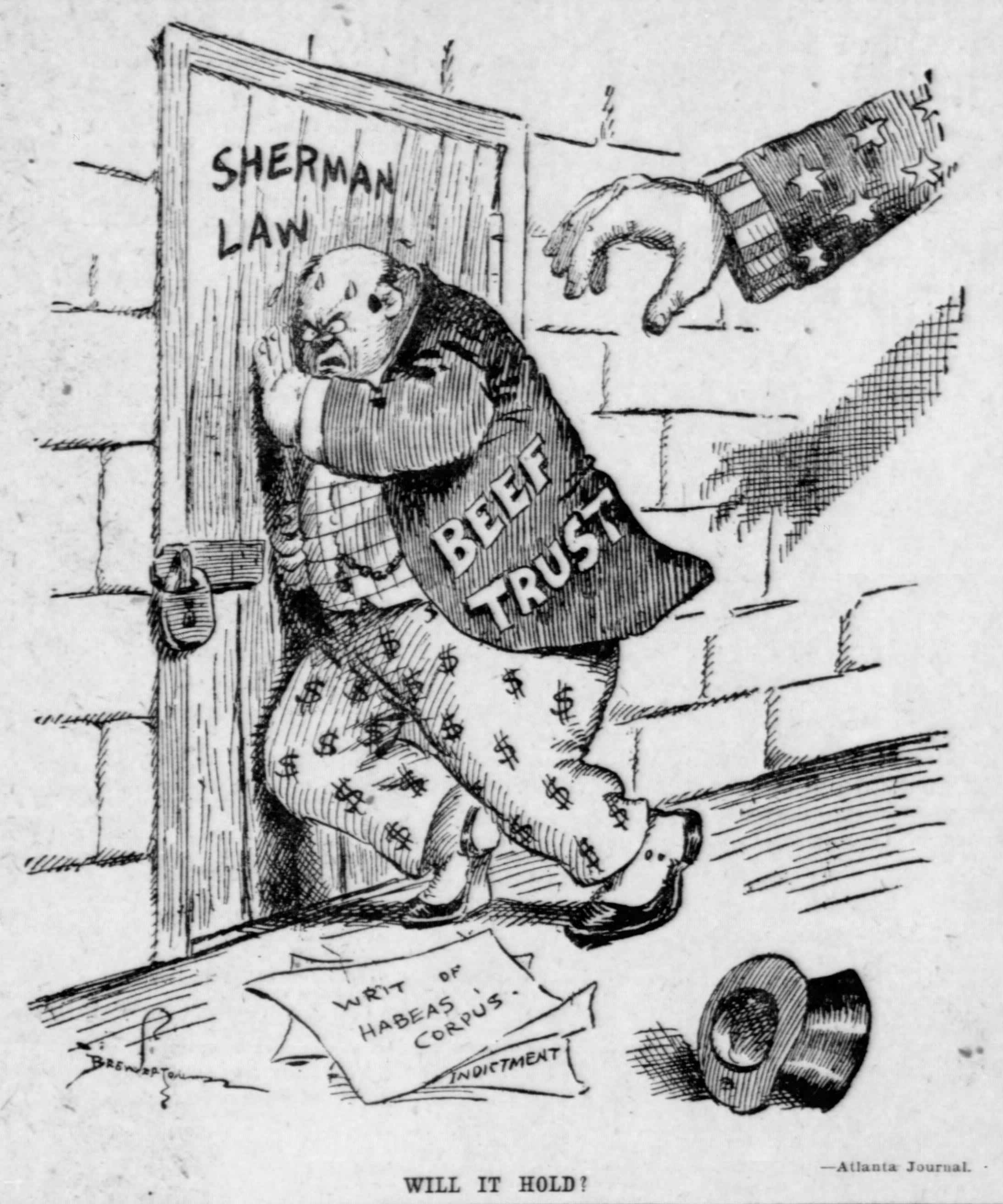
1911 comic depicting trust opposition to the Sherman Antitrust Act

The federal government began filing cases under the Sherman Antitrust Act in 1890. Some cases were successful and others were not; many took several years to decide, including appeals.

Notable cases filed under the act include:

- United States v. Workingmen's Amalgamated Council of New Orleans (1893), which was the first to hold that the law applied to labor unions.
- Chesapeake & Ohio Fuel Co. v. United States (1902), in which the trust was dissolved
- Northern Securities Co. v. United States (1904), which reached the Supreme Court, dissolved the company and set many precedents for interpretation.
- Hale v. Henkel (1906) also reached the Supreme Court. Precedent was set for the production of documents by an officer of a company, and the self-incrimination of the officer in his or her testimony to the grand jury. Hale was an officer of the American Tobacco Co.
- Standard Oil Co. of New Jersey v. United States (1911), which broke up the company based on geography, and contributed to the Panic of 1910–1911.
- United States v. American Tobacco Co. (1911), which split the company into four.
- United States v. General Electric Co (1911), where GE was judged to have violated the Sherman Anti-Trust Act, along with International General Electric, Philips, Sylvania, Tungsol, and Consolidated and Chicago Miniature. Corning and Westinghouse made consent decrees.
- United States v. Motion Picture Patents Co. (1915), which ruled that the company was abusing its monopolistic rights, and therefore, violated the Sherman act.
- Federal Baseball Club v. National League (1922) in which the Supreme Court ruled that Major League Baseball was not interstate commerce and was not subject to the antitrust law.
- United States v. National City Lines (1953), related to the General Motors streetcar conspiracy.
- United States v. AT&T Co., which was settled in 1982 and resulted in the breakup of the company.
- Wilk v. American Medical Association (1990) Judge Getzendanner issued her opinion that the AMA had violated Section 1, but not 2, of the Sherman Act, and that it had engaged in an unlawful conspiracy in restraint of trade "to contain and eliminate the chiropractic profession."
- United States v. Microsoft Corp. was settled in 2001 without the breakup of the company.
- Fleischman vs Albany Medical Center (2010), where nurses alleged Albany Medical Center suppressed their wages in violation of the Sherman Anti-Trust Act, by sharing wage information with other area hospitals. References: (1) Casetext Fleischman vs Albany Medical Center (2) Justia Docket No. 10-0846-mv
- United States v. Google LLC (2020, ongoing as of 2025), wherein Judge Amit Mehta ruled Google acted illegally to maintain a monopoly in online search.

== Legal application ==
=== Constitutional basis for legislation ===
Congress claimed power to pass the Sherman Act through its constitutional authority to regulate interstate commerce. Therefore, federal courts only have jurisdiction to apply the Act to conduct that restrains or substantially affects either interstate commerce. (Congress also has ultimate authority over economic rules within the District of Columbia and US territories under the 17th enumerated power and the Territorial Clause, respectively.) This requires that the plaintiff must show that the conduct occurred during the flow of interstate commerce or had an appreciable effect on some activity that occurs during interstate commerce.

=== Elements ===
A Section 1 violation has three elements:

1. an agreement;
2. which unreasonably restrains competition; and
3. which affects interstate commerce.

A Section 2 monopolization violation has two elements:

1. the possession of monopoly power in the relevant market; and
2. the willful acquisition or maintenance of that power as distinguished from growth or development as a consequence of a superior product, business acumen, or historic accident.

Section 2 also bans attempted monopolization, which has the following elements:

1. qualifying exclusionary or anticompetitive acts designed to establish a monopoly
2. specific intent to monopolize; and
3. dangerous probability of success (actual monopolization).

=== Violations "per se" and violations of the "rule of reason" ===
Violations of the Sherman Act fall (loosely) into two categories:

- Violations "per se": These are violations that meet the strict characterization of Section 1 ("agreements, conspiracies or trusts in restraint of trade"). A per se violation requires no further inquiry into the practice's actual effect on the market or the intentions of those individuals who engaged in the practice. Conduct characterized as unlawful per se is that which has been found to have a "'pernicious effect on competition' or 'lack[s] ... any redeeming virtue'" Such conduct "would always or almost always tend to restrict competition and decrease output". When a per se rule is applied (in contrast to a rule of reason analysis), a civil violation of the antitrust laws is found merely by proving that the conduct occurred and that it fell within a per se category. Conduct considered unlawful per se includes horizontal price-fixing, horizontal market division, and concerted refusals to deal.
- Violations of the "rule of reason": A totality of the circumstances test, asking whether the challenged practice promotes or suppresses market competition. Unlike with per se violations, intent and motive are relevant when predicting future consequences. The rule of reason is said to be the "traditional framework of analysis" to determine whether Section 1 is violated. The court analyzes "facts peculiar to the business, the history of the restraining, and the reasons why it was imposed", to determine the effect on competition in the relevant product market. A restraint violates Section 1 if it unreasonably restrains trade.
  - Quick-look: A "quick look" analysis under the rule of reason may be used when "an observer with even a rudimentary understanding of economics could conclude that the arrangements in question would have an anticompetitive effect on customers and markets", yet the violation is also not one considered unlawful per se. Taking a "quick look", economic harm is presumed from the questionable nature of the conduct, and the burden is shifted to the defendant to prove harmlessness or justification. The quick-look became a popular way of disposing of cases where the conduct was in a grey area between illegality "per se" and demonstrable harmfulness under the "rule of reason".

=== Modern trends ===
==== Inference of conspiracy ====
A modern trend has increased difficulty for antitrust plaintiffs as courts have come to hold plaintiffs to increasing burdens of pleading. Under older Section 1 precedent, it was not settled how much evidence was required to show a conspiracy. For example, a conspiracy could be inferred based on parallel conduct, etc. That is, plaintiffs were only required to show that a conspiracy was conceivable. Since the 1970s, however, courts have held plaintiffs to higher standards, giving antitrust defendants an opportunity to resolve cases in their favor before significant discovery under FRCP 12(b)(6). That is, to overcome a motion to dismiss, plaintiffs, under Bell Atlantic Corp. v. Twombly, must plead facts consistent with FRCP 8(a) sufficient to show that a conspiracy is plausible (and not merely conceivable or possible). This protects defendants from bearing the costs of antitrust "fishing expeditions"; however it deprives plaintiffs of perhaps their only tool to acquire evidence (discovery).

===== Manipulation of market =====
Second, courts have employed more sophisticated and principled definitions of markets. Market definition is necessary, in rule of reason cases, for the plaintiff to prove a conspiracy is harmful. It is also necessary for the plaintiff to establish the market relationship between conspirators to prove their conduct is within the per se rule.

In early cases, plaintiffs could establish a defendant's domination of a market by tailoring the definition of what constituted the market in question. For example: in U.S. v. Grinnell, 384 U.S. 563 (1966), the trial judge, Charles Wyzanski, defined the market as only composed of alarm companies who offered accredited central station services, and deemed local alarm providers and watchmen as not constituting substitute services. By this definition of the market on which the defendant operated, the defendant's commercial strategy, which included "discriminatory price manipulation to forestall competition, and the acquisition of competitors", and their consequent market share of 87%, rendered them a monopolist in the court's view. If the court had conversely defined local alarm firms and watchmen as adequately offering competitive substitutes for the defendant's accredited central station services, the defendant's market share would have been smaller, and they may thus not have been deemed a monopolist.

=== Monopoly ===
Section 2 of the Act forbids monopoly. In Section 2 cases, the court has, again on its own initiative, drawn a distinction between coercive and innocent monopoly. The act is not meant to punish businesses that come to dominate their market passively or on their own merit, only those that intentionally dominate the market through misconduct, which generally consists of conspiratorial conduct of the kind forbidden by Section 1 of the Sherman Act, or Section 3 of the Clayton Act.

=== Application of the act outside pure commerce ===
While the Act was aimed at regulating businesses, its prohibition of contracts restricting commerce was applied to the activities of labor unions until the 1930s. This is because unions were characterized as cartels as well (cartels of laborers). In 1914 the Clayton Act created exceptions for certain union activities, but the Supreme Court ruled in Duplex Printing Press Co. v. Deering that the actions allowed by the Act were already legal. Congress included provisions in the Norris–La Guardia Act in 1932 to more explicitly exempt organized labor from antitrust enforcement, and the Supreme Court upheld these exemptions in United States v. Hutcheson 312 U.S. 219.

== Preemption by Section 1 of state statutes that restrain competition ==
To determine whether the Act preempts a state law, courts will engage in a two-step analysis, as set forth by the Supreme Court in Rice v. Norman Williams Co.

- First, they will inquire whether the state legislation "mandates or authorizes conduct that necessarily constitutes a violation of the antitrust laws in all cases, or ... places irresistible pressure on a private party to violate the antitrust laws in order to comply with the statute." Rice v. Norman Williams Co., 458 U.S. 654, 661; see also 324 Liquor Corp. v. Duffy, 479 U.S. 335 (1987) ("Our decisions reflect the principle that the federal antitrust laws pre-empt state laws authorizing or compelling private parties to engage in anticompetitive behavior.")
- Second, they will consider whether the state statute is saved from preemption by the state action immunity doctrine (aka Parker immunity). In California Retail Liquor Dealers Ass'n v. Midcal Aluminum, Inc., 445 U.S. 97, 105 (1980), the Supreme Court established a two-part test for applying the doctrine: "First, the challenged restraint must be one clearly articulated and affirmatively expressed as state policy; second, the policy must be actively supervised by the State itself." Id. (citation and quotation marks omitted).

The antitrust laws allow coincident state regulation of competition. The Supreme Court enunciated the test for determining when a state statute is in irreconcilable conflict with Section 1 of the Sherman Act in Rice v. Norman Williams Co. Different standards apply depending on whether a statute is attacked on its face or for its effects.

A statute can be condemned on its face only when it mandates, authorizes or places irresistible pressure on private parties to engage in conduct constituting a per se violation of Section 1.

If the statute does not mandate conduct violating a per se rule, the conduct is analyzed under the rule of reason, which requires an examination of the conduct's actual effects on competition. If unreasonable anticompetitive effects are created, the required conduct violates Section 1 and the statute is in irreconcilable conflict with the Sherman Act. Then statutory arrangement is analyzed to determine whether it qualifies as "state action" and is thereby saved from preemption.

Rice sets out guidelines to aid in preemption analysis. Preemption should not occur "simply because in a hypothetical situation a private party's compliance with the statute might cause him to violate the antitrust laws". This language suggests that preemption occurs only if economic analysis determines that the statutory requirements create "an unacceptable and unnecessary risk of anticompetitive effect", and does not occur simply because it is possible to use the statute in an anticompetitive manner. It should not mean that preemption is impossible whenever both procompetitive and anticompetitive results are conceivable. The per se rule "reflects the judgment that such cases are not sufficiently common or important to justify the time and expense necessary to identify them".

Another important, yet, in the context of Rice, ambiguous guideline regarding preemption by Section 1 is the Court's statement that a "state statute is not preempted by the federal antitrust laws simply because the state scheme might have an anticompetitive effect". The meaning of this statement is clarified by examining the three cases cited in Rice to support the statement.

In New Motor Vehicle Board v. Orrin W. Fox Co., automobile manufacturers and retail franchisees contended that the Sherman Act preempted a statute requiring manufacturers to secure the permission of a state board before opening a new dealership if and only if a competing dealer protested. They argued that a conflict existed because the statute permitted "auto dealers to invoke state power for the purpose of restraining intrabrand competition".

In Exxon Corp. v. Governor of Maryland, oil companies challenged a state statute requiring uniform statewide gasoline prices in situations where the Robinson-Patman Act would permit charging different prices. They reasoned that the Robinson-Patman Act is a qualification of our "more basic national policy favoring free competition" and that any state statute altering "the competitive balance that Congress struck between the Robinson-Patman and Sherman Acts" should be preempted.

In both New Motor Vehicle and Exxon, the Court upheld the statutes and rejected the arguments presented as

Merely another way of stating that the ... statute will have an anticompetitive effect. In this sense, there is a conflict between the statute and the central policy of the Sherman Act – 'our charter of economic liberty'. ... Nevertheless, this sort of conflict cannot itself constitute a sufficient reason for invalidating the ... statute. For if an adverse effect on competition were, in and of itself, enough to render a state statute invalid, the States' power to engage in economic regulation would be effectively destroyed.

This indicates that not every anticompetitive effect warrants preemption. In neither Exxon nor New Motor Vehicle did the created effect constitute an antitrust violation. The Rice guideline therefore indicates that only when the effect unreasonably restrains trade, and is therefore a violation, can preemption occur.

The third case cited to support the "anticompetitive effect" guideline is Joseph E. Seagram & Sons v. Hostetter, in which the Court rejected a facial Sherman Act preemption challenge to a statute requiring that persons selling liquor to wholesalers affirm that the price charged was no higher than the lowest price at which sales were made anywhere in the United States during the previous month. Since the attack was a facial one, and the state law required no per se violations, no preemption could occur. The Court also rejected the possibility of preemption due to Sherman Act violations stemming from misuse of the statute. The Court stated that rather than imposing "irresistible economic pressure" on sellers to violate the Sherman Act, the statute "appears firmly anchored to the assumption that the Sherman Act will deter any attempts by the appellants to preserve their ... price level [in one state] by conspiring to raise the prices at which liquor is sold elsewhere in the country". Thus, Seagram indicates that when conduct required by a state statute combines with other conduct that, taken together, constitutes an illegal restraint of trade, liability may be imposed for the restraint without requiring preemption of the state statute.

Rice v. Norman Williams Co. supports this misuse limitation on preemption. Rice states that while particular conduct or arrangements by private parties would be subject to per se or rule of reason analysis to determine liability, "[t]here is no basis ... for condemning the statute itself by force of the Sherman Act."

Thus, when a state requires conduct analyzed under the rule of reason, a court must carefully distinguish rule of reason analysis for preemption purposes from the analysis for liability purposes. To analyze whether preemption occurs, the court must determine whether the inevitable effects of a statutory restraint unreasonably restrain trade. If they do, preemption is warranted unless the statute passes the appropriate state action tests. But, when the statutory conduct combines with other practices in a larger conspiracy to restrain trade, or when the statute is used to violate the antitrust laws in a market in which such a use is not compelled by the state statute, the private party might be subjected to antitrust liability without preemption of the statute.

=== Evidence from legislative history ===
The Act was not intended to regulate existing state statutes regulating commerce within state borders. The House committee, in reporting the bill which was adopted without change, declared:

No attempt is made to invade the legislative authority of the several States or even to occupy doubtful grounds. No system of laws can be devised by Congress alone which would effectually protect the people of the United States against the evils and oppression of trusts and monopolies. Congress has no authority to deal, generally, with the subject within the States, and the States have no authority to legislate in respect of commerce between the several States or with foreign nations.

See also the statement on the floor of the House by Mr. Culberson, in charge of the bill,

There is no attempt to exercise any doubtful authority on this subject, but the bill is confined strictly and alone to subjects over which, confessedly, there is no question about the legislative power of Congress.

And see the statement of Senator Edmunds, chairman of the Senate Judiciary Committee which reported out the bill in the form in which it passed, that in drafting that bill the committee thought that "we would frame a bill that should be clearly within our constitutional power, that we would make its definition out of terms that were well known to the law already, and would leave it to the courts in the first instance to say how far they could carry it or its particular definitions as applicable to each particular case as the occasion might arise."

Similarly Senator Hoar, a member of that committee who with Senator Edmunds was in charge of the bill, stated

Now we are dealing with an offense against interstate or international commerce, which the State cannot regulate by penal enactment, and we find the United States without any common law. The great thing that this bill does, except affording a remedy, is to extend the common-law principles, which protected fair competition in trade in old times in England, to international and interstate commerce in the United States.

== Criticism ==
Alan Greenspan, in his essay entitled Antitrust, described the Sherman Act as stifling innovation and harming society. "No one will ever know what new products, processes, machines, and cost-saving mergers failed to come into existence, killed by the Sherman Act before they were born. No one can ever compute the price that all of us have paid for that Act which, by inducing less effective use of capital, has kept our standard of living lower than would otherwise have been possible." Greenspan summarized the nature of antitrust law as "a jumble of economic irrationality and ignorance". Greenspan at that time was a disciple and friend of Ayn Rand, and he first published Antitrust in Rand's monthly publication The Objectivist Newsletter. Rand, who described herself as "a radical for capitalism", opposed antitrust law not only on economic grounds but also morally, as a violation of property rights, asserting that the "meaning and purpose" of antitrust law is "the penalizing of ability for being ability, the penalizing of success for being success, and the sacrifice of productive genius to the demands of envious mediocrity".

In 1890, Representative William E. Mason said "trusts have made products cheaper, have reduced prices; but if the price of oil, for instance, were reduced to one cent a barrel, it would not right the wrong done to people of this country by the trusts which have destroyed legitimate competition and driven honest men from legitimate business enterprise." Consequently, if the primary goal of the act is to protect consumers, and consumers are protected by lower prices, the act may be harmful if it reduces economy of scale, a price-lowering mechanism, by breaking up big businesses. Mason put small business survival, a justice interest, on a level concomitant with the pure economic rationale of consumer interest.

Economist Thomas DiLorenzo notes that Senator Sherman sponsored the 1890 William McKinley tariff just three months after the Sherman Act, and agrees with The New York Times which wrote on October 1, 1890: "That so-called Anti-Trust law was passed to deceive the people and to clear the way for the enactment of this Pro-Trust law relating to the tariff." The New York Times went on to assert that Sherman merely supported this "humbug" of a law "in order that party organs might say ... 'Behold! We have attacked the trusts. The Republican Party is the enemy of all such rings.'" Dilorenzo writes: "Protectionists did not want prices paid by consumers to fall. But they also understood that to gain political support for high tariffs they would have to assure the public that industries would not combine to increase prices to politically prohibitive levels. Support for both an antitrust law and tariff hikes would maintain high prices while avoiding the more obvious bilking of consumers."

Robert Bork was well known for his outspoken criticism of the antitrust regime. Another conservative legal scholar and judge, Richard Posner of the Seventh Circuit, does not condemn the entire regime, but expresses concern with the potential that it could be applied to create inefficiency, rather than to avoid inefficiency. Posner further believes, along with a number of others, including Bork, that genuinely inefficient cartels and coercive monopolies, the target of the act, would be self-corrected by market forces, making the strict penalties of antitrust legislation unnecessary. Conversely, liberal U.S. Supreme Court Justice William O. Douglas criticized the judiciary for interpreting and enforcing the antitrust law unequally: "From the beginning it [the Sherman Act] has been applied by judges hostile to its purposes, friendly to the empire builders who wanted it emasculated ... trusts that were dissolved reintegrated in new forms ... It is ironic that the Sherman Act was truly effective in only one respect, and that was when it was applied to labor unions. Then the courts read it with a literalness that never appeared in their other decisions."

According to a 2018 study in the journal Public Choice, "Senator John Sherman of Ohio was motivated to introduce an antitrust bill in late 1889 partly as a way of enacting revenge on his political rival, General and former Governor Russell Alger of Michigan, because Sherman believed that Alger personally had cost him the presidential nomination at the 1888 Republican national convention ... Sherman was able to pursue his revenge motive by combining it with the broader Republican goals of preserving high tariffs and attacking the trusts."

== See also ==
- Alcoa
- American Bar Association
- American Tobacco Company
- Antitrust
- Bell System divestiture
- Cartel
- Clayton Antitrust Act of 1914
- DRAM price fixing
- George H. Earle, Jr.
  - Plan of Bill Proposed by Hon. George H. Earle, Jr., Philadelphia. (1911) at Wikisource
- Federal Baseball Club v. National League
- Laissez-faire
- Lysine price-fixing conspiracy
- Monsanto Co. v. Spray-Rite Service Corp.
- National Linseed Oil Trust
- Northern Securities Company
- Price fixing
- Resale price maintenance
- Sarbanes–Oxley Act
- Standard Oil
- Standard Oil Co. of New Jersey v. United States
- Ticketmaster
- Tying (commerce)
- United States v. Microsoft
