= Rowland v. California Men's Colony =

- Supreme Court of the United States

Argued October 6, 1992 Decided January 12, 1993
- Full case name: Rowland, former director, California Department of Corrections, et al. v. California Men's Colony, Unit II Men's Advisory Council
- Docket no.: 91-1188
- Citations: 506 U.S. 194 (more) 113 S.Ct. 716

Holding
- Only natural persons qualify for treatment in forma pauperis under the federal IFP statute.

Court membership
- Chief Justice William Rehnquist Associate Justices Byron White · Harry Blackmun; John P. Stevens · Sandra Day O'Connor; Antonin Scalia · Anthony Kennedy; David Souter · Clarence Thomas

Case opinions
- Majority: Souter, joined by Rehnquist, White, O'Connor, Scalia
- Dissent: Kennedy
- Dissent: Thomas, joined by Blackmun, Stevens, Kennedy

Laws applied
- 28 U.S.C. § 1915; Dictionary Act (1 U.S.C. § 1)

Rowland v. California Men's Colony, Unit II Men's Advisory Council, 506 U.S. 194 (1993), was a United States Supreme Court case in which the court held that only a natural person may qualify for in forma pauperis (IFP) treatment in federal court under 28 U.S.C. § 1915, and that the term "person" as used in § 1915 does not include artificial entities.

== Background ==
The Respondent, the Unit II Men's Advisory Council, was an association of incarcerated people in the California Men's Colony, tasked with advising the warden of feedback and complaints raised by incarcerated people, with its members being elected by residents in the facility.

In 1989, the Unit II Men's Advisory Council filed a complaint in federal district court, alleging violations of the Eighth and Fourteenth amendments by correctional officers after they stopped providing free tobacco to residents. The Council attempted to proceed in forma pauperis under 28 U.S.C. § 1915, claiming that the warden did not allow the Council to hold funds.

The Court of Appeals for the Ninth Circuit noted on appeal that an association, such as the Council, may qualify as a "person" under § 1915, under the Dictionary Act (1 U.S.C. § 1) definition, which includes artificial entities such as corporations and "associations".

The Supreme Court granted certiorari to resolve a circuit split, with the Fifth Circuit ruling that "person" under § 1915 included only natural persons.

== Decision ==
The Supreme Court ruled that only natural persons qualify for in forma pauperis treatment in federal court under § 1915, with the context of the statute indicating that Congress intended for the provision to apply solely for natural persons, excluding artificial entities such as corporations and associations.

== See also ==
- Coleman v. Tollefson
- Mohamad v. Palestinian Authority
