= List of United States Supreme Court cases, volume 506 =

This is a list of all the United States Supreme Court cases from volume 506 of the United States Reports:

Case name	Citation	Date decided
Martin v. District of Columbia Court of Appeals	506 U.S. 1	1992
Montana v. Imlay	506 U.S. 5	1992
Dismissed as improvidently granted. Stevens concurred. White dissented.
Church of Scientology v. United States	506 U.S. 9	1992
Hadley v. United States	506 U.S. 19	1992
Dismissed as improvidently granted.
Parke v. Raley	506 U.S. 20	1992
Richmond v. Lewis	506 U.S. 40	1992
Soldal v. Cook County	506 U.S. 56	1992
Mississippi v. Louisiana	506 U.S. 73	1992
Republic Nat'l Bank v. United States	506 U.S. 80	1992
Farrar v. Hobby	506 U.S. 103	1992
District of Columbia v. Bd. of Trade	506 U.S. 125	1992
Puerto Rico Aqueduct & Sewer Auth. v. Metcalf & Eddy, Inc.	506 U.S. 139	1993
Bath Iron Works Corp. v. Director	506 U.S. 153	1993
Commissioner v. Soliman	506 U.S. 168	1993
Rowland v. California Men's Colony	506 U.S. 194	1993
Nixon v. United States	506 U.S. 224	1993
Crosby v. United States	506 U.S. 255	1993
Bray v. Alexandria Women's Health Clinic	506 U.S. 263	1993
Dobbs v. Zant	506 U.S. 357	1993
Lockhart v. Fretwell	506 U.S. 364	1993
Herrera v. Collins	506 U.S. 390	1993
Spectrum Sports, Inc. v. McQuillan	506 U.S. 447	1993
Graham v. Collins	506 U.S. 461	1993
Bufferd v. Comm'r	506 U.S. 523	1993
Zafiro v. United States	506 U.S. 534	1993
United States v. Hill	506 U.S. 546	1993
Lamb's Chapel v. Center Moriches Union Free Sch. Dist.	506 U.S. 813	1992
Grubbs v. Delo	506 U.S. 1301	1992
