= Goldfarb v. Virginia State Bar =

- Supreme Court of the United States

Argued March 25, 1975 Decided June 16, 1975
- Full case name: Goldfarb et ux. v. Virginia State Bar et al
- Citations: 421 U.S. 773 (more) 95 S. Ct. 2004; 44 L. Ed. 2d 572; 1975 U.S. LEXIS 13

Case history
- Prior: State bar held exempt from antitrust action, 355 F. Supp. 491 (E.D. Va. 1973), judgment reversed on appeal, 497 F.2d 1 (4th Cir. 1974); cert. granted, 419 U.S. 963 (1974).

Holding
- The legal profession is subject to the Sherman Antitrust Act. A minimum-fee schedule for basic legal services is in restraint of trade and is illegal.

Court membership
- Chief Justice Warren E. Burger Associate Justices William O. Douglas · William J. Brennan Jr. Potter Stewart · Byron White; Thurgood Marshall · Harry Blackmun; Lewis F. Powell Jr. · William Rehnquist

Case opinion
- Majority: Burger, joined by Douglas, Brennan, Stewart, White, Marshall, Blackmun, Rehnquist
- Powell took no part in the consideration or decision of the case.

Laws applied
- Section I of the Sherman Act

Goldfarb v. Virginia State Bar, 421 U.S. 773 (1975), was a U.S. Supreme Court decision. It stated that lawyers engage in "trade or commerce" and hence ended the legal profession's exemption from antitrust laws.

== Facts ==
In 1971, Ruth and Lewis Goldfarb decided to buy a house in Fairfax County, Virginia. To get a mortgage, they needed to perform a title search on the house, which can only be performed by a lawyer i.e. a member of the Virginia State Bar. Goldfarb contacted a lawyer, who quoted him a price suggested in a minimum-fee schedule published by the Fairfax County Bar Association, which was 1% of the property's value. Goldfarb attempted to find a cheaper quote. He sent 36 letters to other lawyers and received 19 responses, all declining to quote a fee lower than the minimum-fee schedule suggests. Some said that they did not know of any attorney who would do so. Unable to find a lower price, Goldfarb agreed to the 1% quote and subsequently sued both the State Bar and the County Bar alleging that the fee schedule amounted to price-fixing and a violation of Section 1 of the Sherman Antitrust Act, seeking both injunctive relief and damages.

The minimum-fee schedule was a list of prices, suggested by the county bar for various basic legal services, such as wills, marriage contracts, and title searches. The enforcement power lay in the hands of the State Bar, which was the administrative agency used by the Supreme Court of Virginia to regulate the legal profession. Without a license from the State Bar, no one can practice law in Virginia. The State Bar did not compel adherence to this fee schedule, but it had published several reports condoning the practice and had opined that habitual violation of the minimum-fee schedule suggests misconduct on the part of the lawyer.

=== Petitioners' arguments ===
The plaintiffs argued that the minimum-fee schedule created an artificial price floor for title searches in Fairfax County and that, in the absence of this fee schedule, they would have been able to procure a quote lower than the one listed in the schedule. They pointed to the history of Section 1, Sherman Act enforcement. In Addyston Pipe and Steel Company v. United States, Judge Taft created the distinction between naked and ancillary restraints of trade, and the Virginia State Bar's restraints are naked. In United States v. Trenton Potteries, the Supreme Court first established per se illegality of price-fixing because a reasonable price today may become unreasonable tomorrow and the courts cannot be expected to re-confirm every price. The reasonableness of the fees on the minimum-fee schedule is, then, immaterial. And finally, in United States v. Socony-Vacuum Oil Co, Inc., the Court proclaimed, in a famous footnote, that price-fixing need be neither intentional or feasible to be found per se illegal. Hence, the fact that the State Bar's power of compulsion was not absolute does not mean the fee schedule is legal.

=== Respondents' arguments ===
The defendants posed four separate arguments.

1. The minimum-fee schedule is purely advisory and is only intended to provide information to members. No attorney is compelled to follow it. Furthermore, while membership in the State Bar is a prerequisite to practice law in Virginia, membership in the County Bar is voluntary, and hence, any guidelines, such as the fee schedule, adopted by a local bar association, are also voluntary.
2. This was to be a transaction between a resident of Virginia and a lawyer residing in Virginia, influenced by his County Bar and the Virginia State Bar. Since interstate commerce is not affected, federal law in general and the Sherman Act in particular do not apply.
3. Law is a "learned profession." Lawyers do not engage in trade and commerce and hence any restrictions on the pricing schemes they use are not restraints of trade, prohibited under the Sherman Act.
4. Because the Virginia State Bar is licensed by the Virginia Supreme Court to regulate the profession in the state, policies promulgated by it and its subsidiaries are "state action" and are thus subject to the Parker v. Brown state action exemption from federal antitrust law.

== Judgment ==
The Supreme Court held that since prices were fixed, since price-fixing is per se illegal under the Sherman Act, and since no valid exemption from the Sherman Act could be shown, the minimum-fee schedule violates Section 1 of the Sherman Act. The Circuit Court judgment was reversed, and the case was remanded to District court to determine the proper remedy. The court rejected each defense attempted by the respondents as follows.

1. It found the fee schedule to be effectively compulsory. The prospect of disciplinary action from the State Bar, regardless of whether the County Bar was a voluntary organization or had enforcement capabilities, was sufficient to dissuade all attorneys from quoting a price below the one listed on the schedule. The attorneys were furthermore assured that their competitors would not undercut them because they would face the same disciplinary action. This effectively created a price floor.
2. The source of financing for the house, which was what originally required Goldfarb to seek a title search, would come from across state lines, making this a matter of interstate commerce.
3. Lawyers provide services in exchange for money, and thus engage in commerce. There is nothing to suggest that the Sherman Act was meant to provide a sweeping exemption to an entire profession regardless of what other not-for-profit purposes the profession may have.
4. While the operation of the Virginia State Bar was prescribed by state action i.e. authority granted by statute to the Virginia Supreme Court, the specific anticompetitive behavior in question—the minimum-fee schedule—was not directly authorized by the State acting as a sovereign. "It is not enough that, as the County Bar puts it, anticompetitive conduct is "prompted" by state action; rather, anticompetitive activities must be compelled by direction of the State acting as a sovereign."

== See also ==
- US antitrust law
- Wouters v Algemene Raad van de Nederlandse Orde van Advocaten (2002) C-309/99, a case of the European Court of Justice, holding that the self-regulation by lawyers of standards was permissible.
