= Virginia State Bar =

Bar Association

- Type: Integrated Bar
- Headquarters: Richmond, Virginia
- Location: United States
- Members: 51,848 in 2022
- Website: Official website

The Virginia State Bar (VSB) is the administrative agency of the Supreme Court of Virginia created to regulate, improve and advance the legal profession in Virginia. Membership in good standing in the VSB is mandatory for attorneys wishing to practice law in the Commonwealth of Virginia. The VSB is thus an integrated bar.

== Organization ==
The VSB is governed by its Council and Executive Committee, whose members are elected or appointed from the judicial circuits in the Commonwealth.

The Virginia Lawyer magazine, which includes the Virginia Lawyer Register, is the official publication of the VSB, distributed to lawyers, judges, general subscribers, law libraries, other state bar associations and the media. VSB publishes numerous pamphlets, handbooks and other publications to aid members and the public. For 45 years, the VSB has also run the Virginia Lawyer Referral Service that provides callers to the service with the name of an attorney who practices in the caller's requested area of the law, and in the caller's geographic area.

The VSB is to be distinguished from the Virginia Bar Association, a voluntary organization.

== History ==
The predecessor to the VSB was the Virginia State Bar Association (VSBA), a voluntary statewide organization founded in 1888 to promote the ethical practice of law in Virginia. The VSBA worked with the legislature to establish a mandatory state affiliated agency. In 1938 the Virginia General Assembly passed a law (and the governor signed) establishing the VSB, and delegating to it the power to issue regulatory opinions that are incorporated into the Code of Virginia. The Virginia State Bar Association continued as a voluntary association, renaming itself the Virginia Bar Association.

The Virginia State Bar reviews complaints against lawyers. There are 17 disciplinary district committees, operating in subcommittees, that review bar complaints in their jurisdiction and determine whether there is sufficient evidence of a violation of the Rules of Professional Conduct, and if so, what the appropriate disposition on the complaint is. The committees speak through their orders, posted online.

In 1963, the VSB was involved in litigation before the United States Supreme Court. In NAACP v. Button, the U.S. Supreme Court struck down the Virginia Bar's attempt to use lawyer ethics laws against the NAACP, which was litigating against Virginia school districts as well as state agencies which had adopted a policy of Massive Resistance to the Brown v. Board of Education decisions. The following year the Supreme Court again decided against the Virginia Bar, this time for its prosecution of a union's referral practices in Brotherhood of Railroad Trainmen v. Virginia ex rel. Virginia State Bar. In Goldfarb v. Virginia State Bar (1975), the bar's minimum fee schedules were stricken down on antitrust grounds, notwithstanding the bar's status as an agency of the Virginia courts. In 1978, the U.S. Court of Appeals for the Fourth Circuit in 'Virginia State Bar v. Surety Title Insurance Agency, Inc.,' 571 F.2d 205 (4th Cir. 1978) was faced with the bar's attempt to regulate non-lawyer employees of title insurance companies.

== Ethics Policy Change ==
In 2000, the Rules of Professional Conduct replaced the "Code of Professional Responsibility" as the rules governing lawyers’ conduct.
