= Parker immunity doctrine =

Principle in antitrust law in the United States

The Parker immunity doctrine is an exemption from liability for engaging in antitrust violations. It applies to the state when it exercises legislative authority in creating a regulation with anticompetitive effects, and to private actors when they act at the direction of the state after it has done so. The doctrine is named for the Supreme Court of the United States case in which it was initially developed, Parker v. Brown.

The rationale behind Parker immunity is that Congress, in enacting the Sherman Act, evidenced no intent to restrain state behavior.

== State must act as a sovereign ==
For the doctrine to apply, the state must act as a sovereign, rather than as a "participant in a private agreement or combination by others for restraint of trade. Antitrust laws do not bar anticompetitive restraints that sovereign states impose "as an act of government". "The key question is whether the allegedly anticompetitive restraint may be considered the product of sovereign state action. If it is not, then even if sectors of state government are involved, the activity will not constitute "state action" under the Parker doctrine and will not receive immunity."

Moreover, the Parker court found that "a state does not give immunity to those who violate the Sherman Act by authorizing them to violate it, or by declaring that their action is lawful." Instead, the anticompetitive conduct "must be compelled by direction of the State acting as a sovereign," not merely prompted by state action, to be immunized under the state action doctrine.

== Special definition of "state action" in Parker immunity cases ==
"State action," as defined in cases granting Parker immunity, is qualitatively different from "state action" in other contexts such as the Fourteenth Amendment. While the Fourteenth Amendment can cover

inadvertent or unilateral acts of state officials not acting pursuant to state policy . . . the term "state action" in antitrust adjudication refers only to government policies that are articulated with sufficient clarity that it can be said that these are in fact the state's policies, and not simply happenstance, mistakes, or acts reflecting the discretion of individual officials.

Because it is grounded in federalism and respect for state sovereignty, this interest in protecting the acts of the sovereign state, even if anticompetitive, outweighs the importance of a freely competitive marketplace, especially in the absence of contrary congressional intent.

"State action" as defined by the Parker doctrine differs from the government "actions" which results from petitioning. The two are not coterminous. A finding of immunity from injury caused by government action under the Noerr-Pennington doctrine does not require a finding of Parker state action. If the government "action" taken is the result of petitioning, Noerr-Pennington immunity attaches to a broader range of government action than does Parker immunity. Noerr-Pennington immunity protects petitioning, so long as it is not a sham. Under Noerr-Pennington immunity, the government actions which flow from valid petitioning need not qualify as Parker "state action." Petitioning "would be considerably chilled by a rule which would require an advocate to predict whether the desired legislation would withstand a constitutional challenge in the courts and to expose itself to a potential treble antitrust action based on that prediction."

== Congress intended the Sherman Act to address business combination, not state combination ==
Without clear congressional intent to preempt, federal laws should not invalidate state programs. "In a dual system of government in which, under the Constitution, the states are sovereign, save only as Congress may constitutionally subtract from their authority, an unexpressed purpose to nullify a state's control over its officers and agents is not lightly to be attributed to Congress." While individual anticompetitive acts of state governments may be considered unwise or counterproductive, the decision to make such choices lies within the sovereign power of the states. Congress did not intend to override important state interests in passing the Sherman Act. "The general language of the Sherman Act should not be interpreted to prohibit anticompetitive actions by the States in their governmental capacities as sovereign regulators."

The Sherman Act was enacted to address the unlawful combination of private businesses. "There is no suggestion of a purpose to restrain state action in the Act's legislative history." The Sherman Act was passed "in the era of 'trusts' and of 'combinations' of businesses and of capital organized and directed to control of the market by suppression of competition in the marketing of goods and services, the monopolistic tendency of which had become a matter of public concern." Given its focus on the problems of private monopolies and combinations, it is not surprising that the Sherman Act does not set out to curb clearly defined anticompetitive state actions.

When a state clearly acts in its sovereign capacity it avoids the constraints of the Sherman Act and may act anticompetitively to further other policy goals. For example, state governments frequently sanction monopolies to ensure consistent provision of essential services like electric power, gas, cable television, or local telephone service. But "a state does not give immunity to those who violate the Sherman Act by authorizing them to violate it, or by declaring that their action is lawful." Only an affirmative decision by the state itself, acting in its sovereign capacity, and with active supervision, can immunize otherwise anticompetitive activity.

== Midcal's two-part test for whether to treat an action as a "state action" ==
Applying Midcal is unnecessary if the alleged antitrust injury was the direct result of a clear sovereign state act. In Massachusetts School of Law, the Court held that where "the states are sovereign in imposing the bar admission requirements [the alleged anticompetitive restraints], the clear articulation and active supervision requirements . . . are inapplicable." There is less need for scrutiny "when the conduct is that of the sovereign itself . . . [because] the danger of unauthorized restraint of trade does not arise." Similarly, concerns about the legitimacy of the action are reduced. The test to determine sufficient state involvement as sovereign is unnecessary when the state legislature or state supreme court acts directly. As the Supreme Court explained: "Closer analysis is required when the activity at issue is not directly that of the legislature or supreme court, but is carried out by others pursuant to state authorization.... When the conduct is that of the sovereign itself, on the other hand, the danger of unauthorized restraint of trade does not arise. When the conduct at issue is in fact that of the state legislature or supreme court, we need not address the issues of 'clear articulation' and 'active supervision.'

However, when it is uncertain whether an act should be treated as state action for the purposes of Parker immunity, courts apply the test set forth in California Retail Liquor Dealers Association v. Midcal Aluminum, Inc. (1980) to "determine whether anticompetitive conduct engaged in by private parties should be deemed state action and thus shielded from the antitrust laws." "First, the challenged restraint must be one clearly articulated and affirmatively expressed as state policy; second, the policy must be actively supervised by the State itself."

1. The Supreme Court has recognized state legislative and judicial action as sovereign under Parker. But "closer analysis is required" when the action is less directly that of the legislature or judiciary. One Court of Appeals has decided that executive officers and agencies "are entitled to Parker immunity for actions taken pursuant to their constitutional or statutory authority, regardless whether these particular actions or their anticompetitive effects were contemplated by the legislature," without the need for Midcal analysis.
2. Parker, by its own terms, immunizes only states. But in order to give effect to Parker immunity, private parties to state action must also be immune. Otherwise, plaintiffs could sue only the private parties and by winning antitrust judgments against them, could thwart state policies as if there were no state immunity. No state could enter into an agreement with private groups, even to further clear state policies, because the potential liability of the private groups would prevent them from joining. Artful pleading should not frustrate state policy. "If Parker immunity attaches, it would also reach the private participants of the [tobacco] Multistate Settlement Agreement."

In Midcal, the Supreme Court clarified that requires states to meet two conditions before antitrust immunity will attach: "First, the challenged restraint must be 'one clearly articulated and affirmatively expressed as state policy'; second, the policy must be 'actively supervised' by the State itself." This clearly articulated state policy may be inferred "if suppression of competition is the 'foreseeable result' of what the statute authorizes". Under Midcal, a state "may displace competition with active state supervision if the displacement is both intended by the State and implemented in its specific details. Actual state involvement, not deference to private pricefixing arrangements under the general auspices of state law, is the precondition for immunity from federal law."

To qualify as state action under the Midcal test, "the challenged restraint must be one 'clearly articulated and affirmatively expressed as state policy.'" A government entity need not "be able to point to a specific, detailed, legislative authorization" to assert a successful Parker defense. But it must be evident that under the "clear articulation" standard the challenged restraint is part of state policy. As the Supreme Court has stated, "Midcal confirms that while a State may not confer antitrust immunity on private persons by fiat, it may displace competition with active state supervision if the displacement is both intended by the State and implemented in its specific details".

The second prong of the Midcal test is whether the resulting antitrust violation was "actively supervised" by the state. This standard is more problematic. The essential inquiry of the "actively supervised" prong is to determine if the "anticompetitive scheme is the State's own". The active supervision prong "requires that state officials have and exercise power to review particular anticompetitive acts of private parties and disapprove those that fail to accord with state policy." "Absent such a program of supervision, there is no realistic assurance that a private party's anticompetitive conduct promotes state policy, rather than merely the party's individual interests." Id. at 100–01. "Such active state review is clearly necessary where private defendants are empowered with some type of discretionary authority in connection with the anticompetitive acts (e.g. to determine price or rate structures)." Rubberstamp approval of private action does not constitute state action. A state must independently review and approve the anticompetitive behavior to satisfy this prong of the Parker doctrine.

A "hybrid restraint" is discussed by Justice Stevens in his concurrence in Rice v. Norman Williams Co.. They are not purely private actions, nor are they entirely attributable to the state in the manner of a legislative act. Hybrid restraints are not the type of sovereign state action found in Massachusetts School of Law or Zimomra, that avoid Midcal treatment. Instead, hybrid restraints involve a degree of private action which calls for Midcal analysis.

== Case list ==
- Southern Motor Carriers Rate Conference v. United States, 105 S. Ct. 1721 (1985)
- Town of Hallie v. City of Eau Claire, 105 S. Ct. 1713 (1985)
- Hoover v. Ronwin, 104 S. Ct. 1989 (1984)
- Community Communications Co. v. City of Boulder, 455 U.S. 40 (1982)
- California Retail Liquor Dealers Ass'n v. Midcal Aluminum, 445 U.S. 97 (1980)
- New Motor Vehicle Bd. v. Orrin W. Fox Co., 439 U.S. 96 (1978)
- City of Lafayette v. Louisiana Power & Light Co., 435 U.S. 389 (1978)
- Bates v. State Bar, 433 U.S. 350 (1977)
- Cantor v. Detroit Edison Co., 428 U.S. 579 (1976)
- Goldfarb v. Virginia State Bar, 421 U.S. 773 (1975)
- Schwegmann Bros. v. Calvert Distillers Corp., 341 U.S. 384 (1951)
- Parker v. Brown, 317 U.S. 341 (1943).
- North Carolina Board of Dental Examiners v. Federal Trade Commission, 574 U.S. 494 (2015).

== See also ==
- A.D. Bedell Wholesale Co., Inc. v. Philip Morris Inc.: contains a thorough summary of the doctrine
- California Retail Liquor Dealers Association v. Midcal Aluminum: also contains a thorough summary of the doctrine, and establishes the two-part test.
- North Carolina State Board of Dental Examiners v. FTC: which is the latest authority on the area from February 25, 2015.
