= Parker v. Brown =

- Supreme Court of the United States

Argued May 5, 1942 Decided January 4, 1943
- Full case name: Parker, Director of Agriculture, et al. v. Brown
- Citations: 317 U.S. 341 (more) 63 S. Ct. 307; 87 L. Ed. 315; 1943 U.S. LEXIS 1263; 1943 Trade Cas. (CCH) ¶ 56,250

Holding
- 39 F.Supp. 895 (reversed)

Court membership
- Chief Justice Harlan F. Stone Associate Justices Owen Roberts · Hugo Black; Stanley F. Reed · Felix Frankfurter; William O. Douglas · Frank Murphy; Robert H. Jackson

Case opinion
- Majority: Stone, joined by unanimous

Laws applied
- Sherman Act

Parker v. Brown, 317 U.S. 341 (1943), was a United States Supreme Court case on the scope of United States antitrust law. It held that actions taken by state governments were exempt from the scope of the Sherman Act.

The case led to the Parker immunity doctrine. The Supreme Court clarified its position in later judgments.

== Background ==
California enacted the Agricultural Prorate Act in 1933 to support agricultural prices by restricting the quantities of crops that growers could sell. The law allowed the state to impose sales restrictions on growers who had not joined voluntary farm cooperatives.

Brown, a California raisin grower and packer, challenged the program adopted for the 1940 raisin crop. He sought an injunction against state officials on the grounds that the program violated the Sherman Antitrust Act and the Commerce Clause. A three-judge panel of the United States District Court for the Southern District of California granted the injunction, finding that the program unlawfully burdened interstate commerce. The state officials appealed to the Supreme Court.
