= List price =

Price that the manufacturer recommends for a retailer to charge

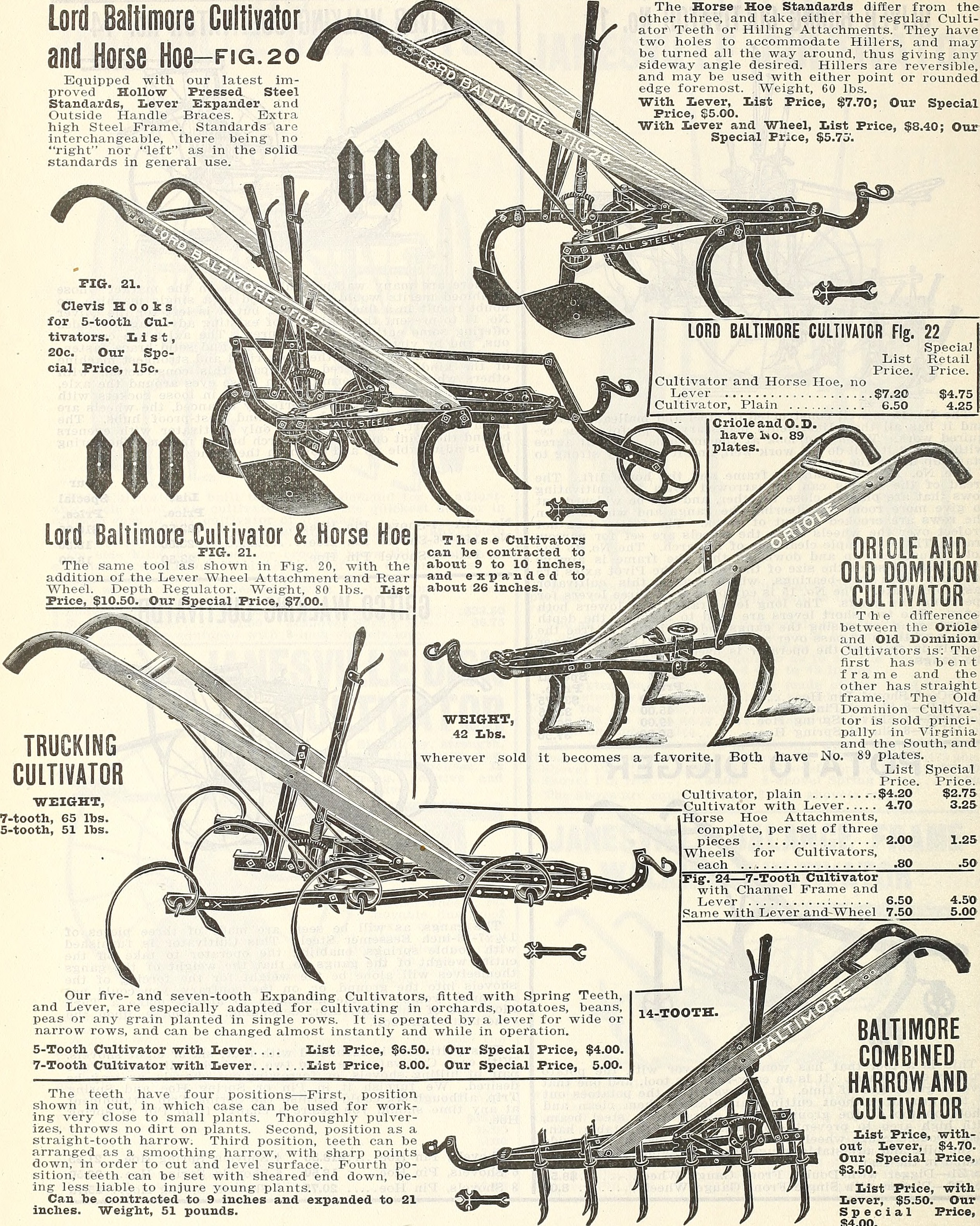
This 1916 advertisement distinguishes the list price and a lower our special price.

The list price, also known as the manufacturer's suggested retail price (MSRP), or the recommended retail price (RRP), or the suggested retail price (SRP) of a product is the price at which its manufacturer notionally recommends that a retailer sell the product. Minimum advertised price, or MAP, refers to the lowest price a retailer is allowed to advertise a product for sale, based on policies set by manufacturers or distributors to maintain brand identity and to ensure that retailers do not advertise or sell their products at excessively low prices, which can lead to several issues such as brand devaluation, price erosion, and unfair competition.

Suggested pricing methods may conflict with competition theory, as they allow prices to be set higher than would be established by supply and demand. Resale price maintenance—fixing prices—goes further than suggesting prices, and is illegal in many countries.

Retailers may charge less than the suggested retail price, depending upon the actual wholesale cost of each item, usually purchased in bulk from the manufacturer, or in smaller quantities through a distributor. The suggested price is sometimes unrealistically high, so the seller can appear to be offering a discount. Some retailers apply discount stickers over top of original prices to indicate a discount to consumers.

List price often cannot be compared directly internationally as products may differ in detail, sometimes due to different regulations, and list prices may or may not include taxes.

== Practice by jurisdiction ==
=== Australia ===
In Australia, any sort of attempt at setting minimum advertised pricing or any retaliation against such a reseller is against the Competition and Consumer Act.

It is also illegal for resellers to ask their suppliers to use recommended price lists to stop competitors from discounting. In most cases, a supplier may specify a maximum price for retail.

There is an exception to this where the reseller is engaging in a loss-leading exercise.

=== Bangladesh and India ===
Bangladesh and India do not use list prices but instead have a maximum retail price.

=== United Kingdom ===
In the United Kingdom, the list price is referred to as a recommended retail price or RRP.

In 1998, the Secretary of State for Trade and Industry prohibited the placing of RRP on electrical goods under the "Domestic Electrical Goods Order", but this ruling was lifted by the Competition Commission in February 2012.

=== United States ===
In the United States, the list price is referred to as the manufacturer's suggested retail price or MSRP.

Under earlier US state Fair Trade statutes, the manufacturer was able to impose a fixed price for items. The fixed prices could offer some price protection to small merchants in competition against larger retail organizations. These were determined to be in restraint of trade. Many manufacturers have adopted MSRP, a price at which the manufacturer suggests the item be priced by a retailer. The term "suggested" can be misleading because in many cases, the MSRP is extremely high compared to the actual wholesale cost, opening the market to "deep discounters", who are able to sell products substantially below the MSRP but still make a profit. The discount stores benefit from exorbitant MSRPs because the discount offered increases the perceived value to customers.

==== Automobiles ====
A common use for MSRP can be seen in automobile sales in the United States. Prior to the spread of manufacturer's suggested retail pricing, there were no defined prices on vehicles, and car dealers were able to impose arbitrary markups, often with prices adjusted to what the salesperson thought the prospective purchaser would be willing to pay for a particular vehicle.

Currently, the MSRP, or "sticker price", the price of a vehicle as labeled by the manufacturer, is clearly labeled on the windows of all new vehicles, on a Monroney sticker, commonly called the "window sticker". The sticker was added as part of the Automobile Information Disclosure Act of 1958. The MSRP is different from the actual price paid to the manufacturer by the dealer, which is known as the "invoice price". There are now numerous sources, such as online appraisal tools, that can be used to find the MSRP and invoice price.

==== Minimum advertised pricing ====
Fixed pricing established between a distributor and seller or between two or more sellers may violate antitrust laws in the United States.

In Leegin Creative Leather Prods., Inc. v. PSKS, Inc., 127 S. Ct. 2705 (2007), the US Supreme Court considered whether federal antitrust law established a per se ban on minimum resale price agreements and, instead, allow resale price maintenance agreements to be judged by the rule of reason, the usual standard applied to determine if there is a violation of section 1 of the Sherman Act. In holding that vertical price restraints should be judged by the rule of reason, the Court overruled Dr. Miles Medical Co. v. John D. Park & Sons Co., 220 U.S. 373 (1911).

Because the rule of reason applies, minimum RPM agreements may still be unlawful. In fact, in Leegin, the Court identified at least two ways in which a purely vertical minimum RPM agreement might be illegal. First, "[a] dominant retailer ... might request resale price maintenance to forestall innovation in distribution that decreases costs. A manufacturer might consider it has little choice but to accommodate the retailer's demands for vertical price restraints if the manufacturer believes it needs access to the retailer's distribution network". Second, "[a] manufacturer with market power... might use resale price maintenance to give retailers an incentive not to sell the products of smaller rivals or new entrants."

In both of these examples, an economically powerful firm uses the RPM agreement to exclude or raise entry barriers for its competition.

In addition, federal law is not the only source of antitrust claims as almost all of the states have their own antitrust laws.

== By sector ==
=== Rack rate ===
'Rack rate' is the travel industry term for the published full price of a hotel room, which the customer would pay by just walking into the hotel off the street and asking for a room. In some jurisdictions, a customer may be entitled to overstay a reservation by paying the rack rate. While the rack rate can be lower than the maximum rate that the hotel may be allowed to charge under local laws, it is higher than the rate most travel agents can book for their customers. Sometimes the terms "run of the house" or "walk-up rate" (in Europe usually "walk-in rate") are used to refer to the same highest rate.

The term "rack rate" is also used by travel-related service providers, such as car rental companies or travel mobile phone rental companies, to refer to the same highest rate that customers would be charged with no prebookings.

In the UK, in September 2010, an investigation was launched by the former Office of Fair Trading (OFT) into breaches of competition law by online travel agents and the hotel industry in relation to the advertised pricing of hotel rooms. As of April 2011, this remained an administrative priority of the OFT.

== See also ==
- Maximum retail price
- Rate card
- Drop shipping
