= United States v. Parke, Davis & Co. =

- Supreme Court of the United States

Argued November 10, 1959 Decided February 29, 1960
- Full case name: United States v. Parke, Davis & Co.
- Citations: 362 U.S. 29 (more) 80 S. Ct. 503; 4 L. Ed. 2d 505

Case history
- Prior: 164 F. Supp. 827 (D.D.C. 1958); probable jurisdiction noted, 359 U.S. 903 (1959).
- Subsequent: Vacated and remanded, 365 U.S. 125 (1961); on remand, 221 F. Supp. 948 (D.D.C. 1963); affirmed, 344 F.2d 173, 120 U.S. App. D.C. 79 (D.C. Cir. 1965).

Holding
- By utilizing wholesalers and other retailers, the company actively induced unwilling retailers to comply with the policy rather than declining to deal with retailers who refused to abide by the resale price maintenance policy; the resulting concerted action constituted a conspiracy or combination in violation of the Sherman Act, although it was not based on any contract, express or implied.

Court membership
- Chief Justice Earl Warren Associate Justices Hugo Black · Felix Frankfurter; William O. Douglas · Tom C. Clark; John M. Harlan II · William J. Brennan Jr. Charles E. Whittaker · Potter Stewart

Case opinions
- Majority: Brennan, joined by Warren, Black, Douglas, Clark,
- Concurrence: Stewart
- Dissent: Harlan, joined by Frankfurter, Whittaker

Laws applied
- Sherman Antitrust Act, 15 U.S.C. § 1

United States v. Parke, Davis & Co., 362 U.S. 29 (1960), was a 1960 decision of the United States Supreme Court limiting the so-called Colgate doctrine, which substantially insulates unilateral refusals to deal with price-cutters from the antitrust laws. The Parke, Davis & Co. case held that, when a company goes beyond "the limited dispensation" of Colgate by taking affirmative steps to induce adherence to its suggested prices, it puts together a combination among competitors to fix prices in violation of § 1 of the Sherman Act. In addition, the Court held that when a company abandons an illegal practice because it knows the US Government is investigating it and contemplating suit, it is an abuse of discretion for the trial court to hold the case that follows moot and dismiss it without granting relief sought against the illegal practice.

== Background ==
Parke-Davis makes pharmaceutical products and markets them through drug wholesalers and drug retailers. The retailers buy these products from the wholesalers or make large quantity purchases directly from Parke Davis. Parke Davis placed in its wholesalers' catalogue a Net Price Selling Schedule listing suggested minimum resale prices on the Parke Davis products that wholesalers sold to retailers and stating that it was "Parke Davis' continuing policy to deal only with drug wholesalers who observed that schedule." The retailers' catalog contained a schedule of minimum retail prices applicable in States with Fair Trade laws, and stated that this schedule was suggested for use also in places such as Virginia and D.C. where there were no Fair Trade laws.

There were about 260 drugstores in D.C., and about 100 in Richmond, Virginia. Many of these stores were units of the large Peoples Drug Store chain (now CVS). Five drug wholesalers handled Parke Davis products in these areas. The wholesalers observed the resale prices suggested by Parke Davis. However, during the spring and early summer of 1956, drug retailers in the two cities advertised and sold several Parke Davis vitamin products at prices substantially below the suggested minimum retail prices. As a result, the Baltimore office manager of Parke Davis in charge of the sales district that included the two cities sought advice from his head office on how to handle this situation. The Parke Davis attorney advised that the company could legally "enforce an adopted policy arrived at unilaterally" to sell only to customers who observed the suggested minimum resale prices. He further advised that this meant that "we can lawfully say 'we will sell you only so long as you observe such minimum retail prices' but cannot say 'we will sell you only if you agree to observe such minimum retail prices,' since, except as permitted by Fair Trade [laws], agreements as to resale price maintenance are invalid."

The Baltimore branch manager put into effect a program for promoting observance of the suggested minimum retail prices. In order to ensure that retailers who did not comply would be cut off from sources of supply, representatives of Parke Davis visited the five wholesalers and told them, in effect, that not only would Parke Davis refuse to sell to wholesalers who did not adhere to the policy announced in its catalogue, but also that it would refuse to sell to wholesalers who sold Parke Davis products to retailers who did not observe the suggested minimum retail prices. Each wholesaler was interviewed individually and informed that his competitors were also being apprised of this. The wholesalers each indicated a willingness to go along with the Parke Davis policy. Parke Davis representatives also called on the price-cutter retailers and told each that, if he did not observe the suggested minimum retail prices, Parke Davis would refuse to deal with him, and that, furthermore, he would be unable to purchase any Parke Davis products from the wholesalers. Each retailer was also told that his competitors were being similarly informed.

Several retailers refused to give Parke Davis any assurances of compliance and continued despite these interviews to advertise and sell Parke Davis products at prices below the suggested minimum retail prices. Parke Davis furnished their names to the wholesalers. Parke Davis refused to fill any direct orders from such retailers, and the wholesalers likewise refused to fill any of their orders. This ban extended to all Parke Davis products, even those necessary to fill prescriptions (on which price cutting had not occurred).

The president of Dart Drug, one of the price-cutter retailers that Parke Davis had cut off, protested to the assistant branch manager of Parke Davis that Parke Davis was discriminating against him because a drugstore across the street, one of the Peoples Drug chain, had a sign in its window advertising Parke Davis vitamin products at cut prices. The retailer was told that, if this were so, the branch manager "would see Peoples and try to get them in line." The branch manager then visited a vice-president of Peoples and told him "that anyone that did not go along with our policy, we were not interested in doing business with them." Peoples then told Parke Davis that it would stop cutting prices on Parke Davis products. However, five retailers, including Dart Drug, continued their price cutting. Parke Davis decided that at least advertising cut prices should stop and that would lessen the price cutting. A Parke Davis representative visited Dart's president and he said that he might be willing to stop advertising, although continuing to sell at discount prices if shipments to him were resumed. Parke Davis representatives then told each of the other price-cutter retailers that Dart was ready to discontinue price-cut advertising. Each of the retailers said that, if Dart stopped advertising, he would also. Parke Davis reported this to Dart, and then all five retailers discontinued advertising of Parke Davis vitamins at less than suggested minimum retail prices, and Parke Davis and the wholesalers resumed sales of Parke Davis products to them.

However, after a month one of the retailers again started newspaper advertising, and, despite the efforts of Parke Davis to prevent it, the others quickly followed suit. At this point, the Antitrust Division of the Department of Justice, on complaint of Dart Drug, began investigating Parke Davis for price fixing. Parke Davis then stopped trying to promote the retailers' adherence to its suggested resale prices, and neither it nor the wholesalers since declined further dealings with the price cutters.

The US Government sued Parke Davis under §§ 1 and 3 of the Sherman Act for combining and conspiring "with retail and wholesale druggists in Washington, D.C., and Richmond, Virginia, to maintain the wholesale and retail prices of Parke Davis pharmaceutical products." The district court held that the Government's proofs did not establish a violation of the Sherman Act because Parke Davis's actions "were properly unilateral, and sanctioned by law under the doctrine laid down in the case of United States v. Colgate."

== Ruling of Supreme Court ==
The Government appealed to the Supreme Court, which reversed. Justice Brennan wrote for the majority, Justice Stewart concurred in the judgment, and Justice Harlan, joined by Justices Frankfurter and Whittaker dissented.

=== Majority opinion ===
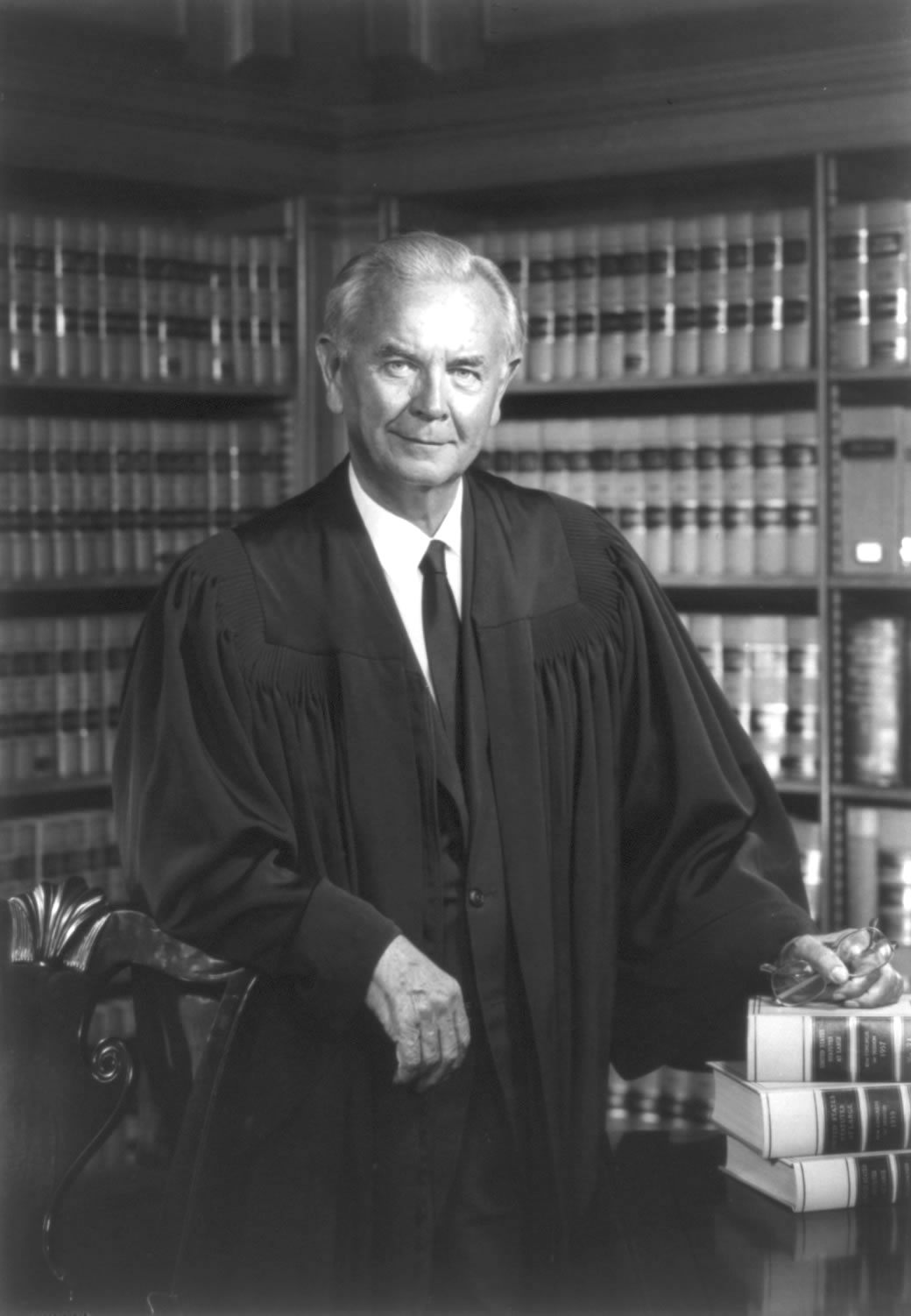
Justice Brennan

Justice Brennan's opinion for the Court began with a review of what the Court had held in its 1919 decision in United States v. Colgate & Co., since the issue before the Court was whether the conduct of Parke Davis fell under the protection of the Colgate doctrine. The Government conceded for the purposes of the Parke Davis case that, under the Colgate doctrine, a manufacturer, having announced a price-maintenance policy, may bring about adherence to it by refusing to deal with customers who do not observe that policy. The Government contended, however, that "subsequent decisions of this Court compel the holding that what Parke Davis did here by entwining the wholesalers and retailers in a program to promote general compliance with its price maintenance policy went beyond mere customer selection, and created combinations or conspiracies to enforce resale price maintenance in violation of . . . the Sherman Act."

==== Dr. Miles ====
"The history of the Colgate doctrine is best understood," the Court said, "by reference to a case which preceded the Colgate decision, Dr. Miles Medical Co. v. John D. Park & Sons Co. In that case, Dr. Miles entered into contracts with wholesale and retail merchants that required them to resell a medicine at prices that Miles fixed. Park refused to sign the contracts, induced customers of Miles to resell to Park, and then Park sold the medicines at cut prices in violation of Miles's resale-price maintenance program. Miles sued Park for inducing Miles's customers to breach their contracts with him. Citing Coke on Littleton, § 360 and Mitchel v Reynolds, the Court held the restrictive agreements that Miles sought to enforce were invalid at common law and under the Sherman Act as well. In the Colgate case, however, there was no agreement, just a refusal to deal with price cutters. "The Colgate decision distinguished Dr. Miles on the ground that the Colgate indictment did not charge that company with selling its products to dealers under agreements which obligated the latter not to resell except at prices fixed by the seller.

==== Schrader's Son ====
In the next case, United States v. Schrader's Son, Inc., the Government indicted a parts manufacturer for entering into price-fixing agreements with retailers, jobbers and manufacturers who used or resold his products. The Schrader's Son Court held that Colgate did not immunize the conduct, and explained that Colgate

meant no more than that a manufacturer is not guilty of a combination or conspiracy if he merely "indicates his wishes concerning prices and declines further dealings with all who fail to observe them ..."; however, there is unlawful combination where a manufacturer "enters into agreements—whether express or implied from a course of dealing or other circumstances—with all customers . . . which undertake to bind them to observe fixed resale prices.

==== Cudahy ====
The next decision was Frey & Son. Inc. v. Cudahy Packing Co., That was a treble damage suit alleging a conspiracy in violation of the Sherman Act between the manufacturer and jobbers to maintain resale prices. In that case, the Court held improper a jury instruction that a Sherman Act violation (price-fixing agreement) could be found if the defendant repeatedly called to the attention of the wholesales and jobbers the minimum price provision of its sales plan and "the great majority of them not only [expressed] no dissent from such plan, but actually [cooperated] in carrying it out by themselves selling at the prices named." But the authority of Cudahy "has been seriously undermined by subsequent decisions," The Parke Davis Court said.

==== Beech-Nut ====
In FTC v. Beech-Nut Packing Co., the company adopted a policy of refusing to sell to price cutters. It set up a policing system. " When an offender was cut off, he would be reinstated upon the giving of assurances that he would maintain prices in the future." The Court held that the FTC could find a violation of FTC Act § 5 where a practice "had a "dangerous tendency unduly to hinder competition or create monopoly." The company sought to defend under Colgate, but the Court said that "the Beech-Nut system goes for beyond the simple refusal to sell goods to persons who will not sell at stated prices, which, in the Colgate case, was held to be within the legal right of the producer." It made no difference that there were not express price-fixing contracts because the course of dealing was equivalent to that. Beech-Nut

limit[ed] Colgate to a holding that, when the only act specified in the indictment amounted to saying that the trader had exercised his right to determine those with whom he would deal, and to announce the circumstances under which he would refuse to sell, no Sherman Act violation was made out. However, because Beech-Nut's methods were as effective as agreements in producing the result that "all who would deal in the company's products are constrained to sell at the suggested prices," the Court held that the securing of the customers' adherence by such methods constituted the creation of an unlawful combination to suppress price competition among the retailers.

==== Bausch & Lomb ====
The next case, United States v. Bausch & Lomb Optical Co., made it clear "that Beech-Nut narrowly limited Colgate and announced principles which subject to Sherman Act liability the producer who secures his customers' adherence to his resale prices by methods which go beyond the simple refusal to sell to customers who will not resell at stated prices." In Bausch & Lomb, the Court found a violation of the Sherman Act where the distributor proffered a price-fixing plan and the wholesales joined in "by cooperating in prices, limitation of sales to and approval of retail licensees." The scope of the Colgate doctrine may have been uncertain before Beech-Nut and Bausch & Lomb but those decisions "plainly fashioned its dimensions as meaning no more than that a simple refusal to sell to customers who will not resell at prices suggested by the seller is permissible under the Sherman Act." A combination in violation of the Sherman Act is "organized if the producer secures adherence to his suggested prices by means which go beyond his mere declination to sell to a customer who will not observe his announced policy."

To sum this up, the Court said:

The Bausch & Lomb and Beech-Nut decisions cannot be read as merely limited to particular fact complexes justifying the inference of an agreement in violation of the Sherman Act. . . . The Sherman Act [also] forbids combinations of traders to suppress competition. True, there results the same economic effect as is accomplished by a prohibited combination to suppress price competition if each customer, although induced to do so solely by a manufacturer's announced policy, independently decides to observe specified resale prices. So long as Colgate is not overruled, this result is tolerated, but only when it is the consequence of a mere refusal to sell in the exercise of the manufacturer's right "freely to exercise his own independent discretion as to parties with whom he will deal." When the manufacturer's actions, as here, go beyond mere announcement of his policy and the simple refusal to deal, and he employs other means which effect adherence to his resale prices, this countervailing consideration is not present, and therefore he has put together a combination in violation of the Sherman Act. Thus, whether an unlawful combination or conspiracy is proved is to be judged by what the parties actually did, rather than by the words they used.

In this case, the Court explained:

Parke Davis did not content itself with announcing its policy regarding retail prices and following this with a simple refusal to have business relations with any retailers who disregarded that policy. Instead, Parke Davis used the refusal to deal with the wholesalers in order to elicit their willingness to deny Parke Davis products to retailers, and thereby help gain the retailers' adherence to its suggested minimum retail prices. The retailers who disregarded the price policy were promptly cut off when Parke Davis supplied the wholesalers with their names. The large retailer who said he would "abide" by the price policy, the multi-unit Peoples Drug chain, was not cut off. In thus involving the wholesalers to stop the flow of Parke Davis products to the retailers, thereby inducing retailers' adherence to its suggested retail prices, Parke Davis created a combination with the retailers and the wholesalers to maintain retail prices and violated the Sherman Act.

Furthermore, Parke Davis exceeded the "limited dispensation" of Colgate in still another way. Its treatment of the advertising controversy "demonstrates how far Parke Davis went beyond the limits of the Colgate doctrine":

Parke Davis did not rest with the simple announcement to the trade of its policy in that regard followed by a refusal to sell to the retailers who would not observe it. First, it discussed the subject with Dart Drug. When Dart indicated willingness to go along, the other retailers were approached, and Dart's apparent willingness to cooperate was used as the lever to gain their acquiescence in the program. Having secured those acquiescences, Parke Davis returned to Dart Drug with the report of the accomplishment. Not until all this was done was the advertising suspended and sales to all the retailers resumed. In this manner, Parke Davis sought assurances of compliance and got them, as well as the compliance itself. It was only by actively bringing about substantial unanimity among the competitors that Parke Davis was able to gain adherence to its policy.

Instead of inducing the retailers to adhere to the price-maintenance program as a "matter of individual free choice prompted alone" by individual self-interest, Parke Davis offered them its products "packaged in a competition-free wrapping . . . by virtue of concerted action induced by the manufacturer." Parke Davis was "thus the organizer of a price maintenance combination or conspiracy in violation of the Sherman Act."

==== Mootness ====
The district court alternatively rested its judgment of dismissal on the holding that Parke Davis had discontinued the scheme. "So far as the record indicates any reason, it is that Parke Davis stopped its efforts because the Department of Justice had instituted an investigation." The Court said that dismissal in such circumstances was an abuse of discretion:

The courts have an obligation, once a violation of the antitrust laws has been established, to protect the public from a continuation of the harmful and unlawful activities. A trial court's wide discretion in fashioning remedies is not to be exercised to deny relief altogether by lightly inferring an abandonment of the unlawful activities from a cessation which seems timed to anticipate suit.

=== Concurrence ===
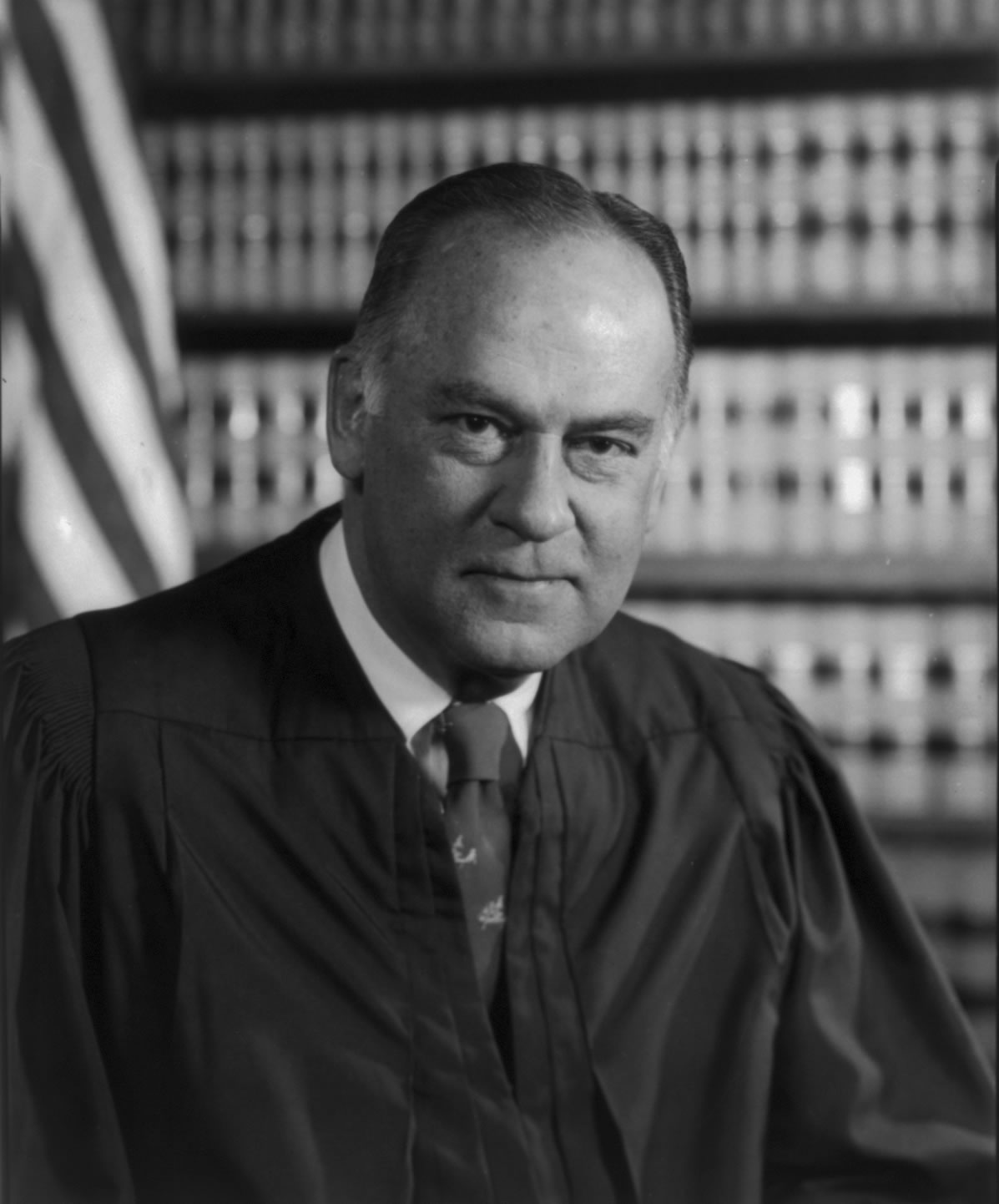
Justice Stewart

Justice Stewart agreed that the record amply "shows an illegal combination to maintain retail prices." He therefore could "find no occasion to question, even by innuendo, the continuing validity of the Colgate decision. (The innuendo to which he objects is in such statements as "So long as Colgate is not overruled, this result is tolerated.")

=== Dissent ===
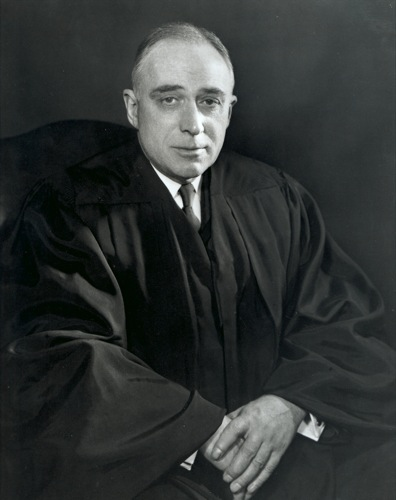
Justice Harlan

Justice Harlan protested:

The Court's opinion reaches much further than at once may meet the eye, and justifies fuller discussion than otherwise might appear warranted. Scrutiny of the opinion will reveal that the Court has done no less than send to its demise the Colgate doctrine, which has been a basic part of antitrust law concepts since it was first announced in 1919.

He found the majority's limited Colgate doctrine vague and incomprehensible:

The Court now says that the seller runs afoul of the Sherman Act when he goes beyond mere announcement of his policy and refusal to sell not because the bare announcement and refusal fall outside the statutory phrase, but because any additional step removes a "countervailing consideration" in favor of permitting a seller to choose his customers. But we are left wholly in the dark as to what the purported new standard is for establishing a "contract, combination . . . or conspiracy [under § 1]."

He denied that Parke Davis went beyond Colgate. Moreover, he sees the majority's treatment of the trial court's findings as disguised oevrruling of Colgate—"I think that what the Court has really done here is to throw the Colgate doctrine into discard." He concludes: "It is surely the emptiest of formalisms to profess respect for Colgate and eviscerate it in application.'

== Subsequent developments ==
In Russell Stover Candies v. FTC, the FTC, "in an admitted effort to test the viability of Colgate," took the position that an unlawful combination or agreement could be found when a buyer unwillingly submitted to and complied with a supplier's pricing policy in order to avoid termination. The Eighth Circuit reversed, however, pointing to the statement in Parke Davis that "a simple refusal to sell to customers who will not resell at prices suggested by the seller is permissible under the Sherman Act" although an unlawful "combination is also organized if the producer secures adherence to his suggested prices by means which go beyond his mere declination to sell to a customer who will not observe his announced policy"; the court added that Parke Davis had been found to have gone far "beyond the limits of the Colgate doctrine" by enlisting wholesalers and retailers to adhere to and participate in the price-fixing program. The court said that the FTC has presented a case in which "there are no 'plus factors' to take the case beyond Colgate," so it reversed the Commission. "Despite the FTC's attempt to gut Colgate," however, "it did not choose to argue that Section 5 [of the FTC Act] does not require agreement." Instead, the FTC attempted to find a violation by invoking § 1 of the Sherman Act, including specifically the requirement of a contract, combination, or conspiracy, but it failed to establish that.

In Business Electronics Corp. v. Sharp Electronics Corp., the Supreme Court held that mere evidence of complaints by retailer competitors about price cutting did not permit inference of an agreement to fix prices. The Court held that "a vertical restraint is not illegal per se unless it includes some agreement on price or price levels." The Court explained that some economic effect must be shown to depart from a rule-of-reason analysis: "[T]here is a presumption in favor of a rule-of-reason standard; [and] departure from that standard must be justified by demonstrable economic effect, such as the facilitation of cartelizing. . . ." A large part of the rationale of the holding of a Sherman Act violation in Parke Davis is that Parke Davis organized a horizontal cartel agreement among its direct customers to fix prices.

In Leegin Creative Leather Products v. PSKS, Inc., the Supreme Court overruled Dr. Miles. It held "that vertical price restraints are to be judged by the rule of reason." Of this ruling, the dissent (but not the majority of the Court) said:

We here overrule one statutory case, Dr. Miles, decided 100 years ago, and we overrule the cases that reaffirmed its per se rule in the intervening years. See, e.g., Trenton Potteries, 273 U.S., at 399-401; Bausch & Lomb, 321 U.S., at 721; United States v. Parke, Davis & Co., 362 U.S. 29, 45-47 (1960); Simpson v. Union Oil Co. of Cal., 377 U.S. 13, 16-17 (1964).

The particular pages of the Parke Davis opinion that the Leegin dissent cites include those in which the Parke Davis Court had found that Parke Davis had put together a horizontal combination or conspiracy among those to whom it sold its products, as in Interstate Circuit, Inc., v. United States. The majority opinion, however, says nothing about overruling Parke Davis.

Furthermore, the majority opinion observed, in obiter dictum, that a vertical arrangement may organize a horizontal cartel:

A horizontal cartel among competing manufacturers or competing retailers that decreases output or reduces competition in order to increase price is, and ought to be, per se unlawful. To the extent a vertical agreement setting minimum resale prices is entered upon to facilitate either type of cartel, it, too, would need to be held unlawful under the rule of reason. This type of agreement may also be useful evidence for a plaintiff attempting to prove the existence of a horizontal cartel.

United States v. Apple Inc. involved a fact pattern very similar to Parke Davis, but in reverse. A retailer of e-books put together or "facilitated" a combination among its suppliers (publishers) to fix and raise prices. The Second Circuit held that "the district court did not err in determining that Apple orchestrated an agreement with and among the Publisher Defendants, in characterizing this agreement as a horizontal price fixing-conspiracy, or in holding that the conspiracy unreasonably restrained trade in violation of § 1 of the Sherman Act. Pointing to "express collusion among" the publishers, the Court said that "Apple consciously played a key role in organizing that collusion." Apple argued that under Leegin its conduct was vertical and had to be judged under a rule-of-reason analysis. The Second Circuit rejected that argument, saying that it was settled law that a mixed vertical and horizontal conspiracy, where distributors and manufacturers act together to fix prices or engage in other conduct illegal per se, as in this case "in which a vertical player organizes a horizontal cartel," are to be judged under the rules applicable to horizontal cartels: "In that situation, the court need not consider whether the vertical agreements restrained trade because all participants agreed to the horizontal restraint, which is and ought to be, per se unlawful."

== Commentary ==
Professor Robinson argues that "some surpassingly foolish Supreme Court decisions" have misinterpreted Parke Davis as making "coercion an effective substitute for agreement." Although in Parke Davis, "the Court did not use the term 'coercion' to characterize the manufacturer's enforcement practices (describing them instead as creating a 'combination')," a few years later "the Court in Simpson v. Union Oil Co. interpreted Parke, Davis as holding that "a supplier may not use coercion on its retail outlets to achieve resale price maintenance."

Professor Hovenkamp contends that Parke Davis partially survives the Leegin decision. He suggests that Parke Davis does not find a price-fixing agreement on the basis of "announced conditions, terminations, or the use of third parties to gather information or to effect a termination." Rather, the Parke Davis Court finds an illegal combination or conspiracy on the basis of "control of third party resales and, more arguably, individualized negotiations with dealers falling short of traditional agreement, and perhaps even exhortation meetings." Although the Parke Davis case also involved "wholesalers reporting noncomplying dealers to the manufacturer as forming an 'information conspiracy' with the latter," he regards that as no longer surviving as a tenable theory under present law.
