= Unilateral policy =

Under a unilateral policy (or "colgate policy" or "unilateral minimum retail price policy") a manufacturer, without any agreement with the reseller, announces a minimum resale price and refuses to make further sales to any reseller that sells below the announced price. Unilateral policy is a form of resale price maintenance that enables a manufacturer to influence the price at which its distributors and dealers resell its products without a formal contract regarding the resale price. The policy was first identified in United States v. Colgate & Co., 250 U.S. 300 (1919).

== Development ==
Beginning with the Sherman Act in 1890 which banned, "every contract, combination …, or conspiracy, in restraint of trade" price fixing by the manufacturer was held to be illegal. In Dr. Miles Medical Co. v. John D. Park and Sons, 220 U.S. 373 (1911), the United States Supreme Court affirmed a lower court's holding that a massive minimum resale price maintenance scheme was unreasonable and thus offended Section 1 of the Sherman Antitrust Act. The decision rested on the assertion that minimum resale price maintenance is indistinguishable in economic effect from naked horizontal price fixing by a cartel. Subsequent decisions characterized Dr Miles as holding that minimum resale price maintenance is unlawful per se - that is, without regard to its impact on the marketplace or consumers.

While vertical price agreements remained taboo, in 1919 the Supreme Court in United States v. Colgate & Co., recognized the manufacturer's right to deal with whomever it wanted, and as importantly, its right to refuse to deal. This distinction allowed manufacturers to announce terms under which they would deal with their resellers and then refuse to deal with those who failed to comply. Colgate's progeny in 1984 further built upon this right in Monsanto Co. v. Spray-Rite Service Corp., stating that, "under Colgate, the manufacturer can announce its re-sale prices in advance and refuse to deal with those who fail to comply, and a distributor is free to acquiesce to the manufacturer's demand in order to avoid termination".

"Colgate policies" are independently adopted and announced by the manufacturer. The manufacturer, without any agreement with the reseller, announces a minimum resale price and refuses to make further sales to any reseller that fails to sell at or above the announced price. There is no contract and the parties do not agree on the price. Aside from suggesting retail prices or having the reseller act as an agent of the manufacturer and sell the goods on consignment, until the 2007 Leegin Creative Leather Products, Inc. v. PSKS, Inc. decision a Unilateral Policy was the only way that a manufacturer could directly influence a reseller's retail price without subjecting itself to per se liability for price fixing.

== See also ==
- US antitrust law
