= Schwegmann Brothers Giant Supermarkets =

Defunct American supermarket chain

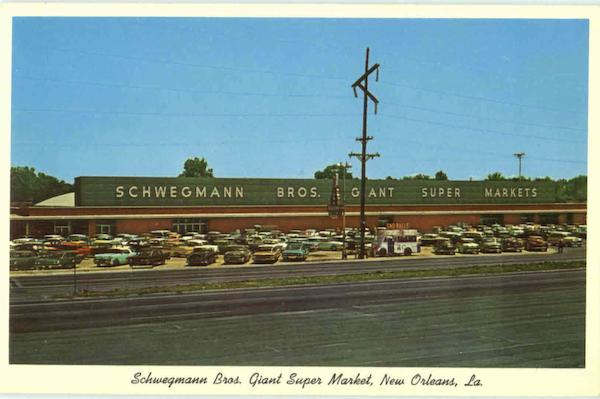
- Jefferson Parish store c. 1950s
- Trade name: Schwegmann's
- Type: Private
- Industry: Grocery
- Founded: February 17, 1859
- Founders: John G. Schwegmann
- Defunct: December 31, 1999
- Fate: Bankruptcy And Liquidation
- Headquarters: New Orleans, Louisiana, U.S., United States
- Number of locations: 18, at its peak, before merger
- Areas served: New Orleans Metropolitan area, Louisiana; Baton Rouge, Louisiana
- Number of employees: Approximately 5000 at its peak
- Divisions: Groceries; Pharmacy

Schwegmann Brothers Giant Supermarkets, commonly known as Schwegmann or colloquially Schwegmann's, was a grocery store chain that served the New Orleans, Louisiana, metropolitan area and one location in Baton Rouge until 1997. The chain developed significant innovations in grocery retailing and influenced other big box retailers that emerged in the latter 20th century and early 21st century. The founder and chief executive of the modern version of the chain was John G. Schwegmann, although his uncle and grandfather ran predecessors to the modern chain.

In the middle of the 20th century, Schwegmann Brothers Giant Supermarkets developed various merchandising practices in grocery retailing. These included: Self-service, Direct distribution, Consistent low pricing and discounting, Rapid turnover of inventory, and One-stop shopping. Store designs also took advantage of the rise in automobile transportation at the time. Many of Schwegmann's merchandising practices subsequently became ubiquitous among large chain store retailers.

== Founding ==
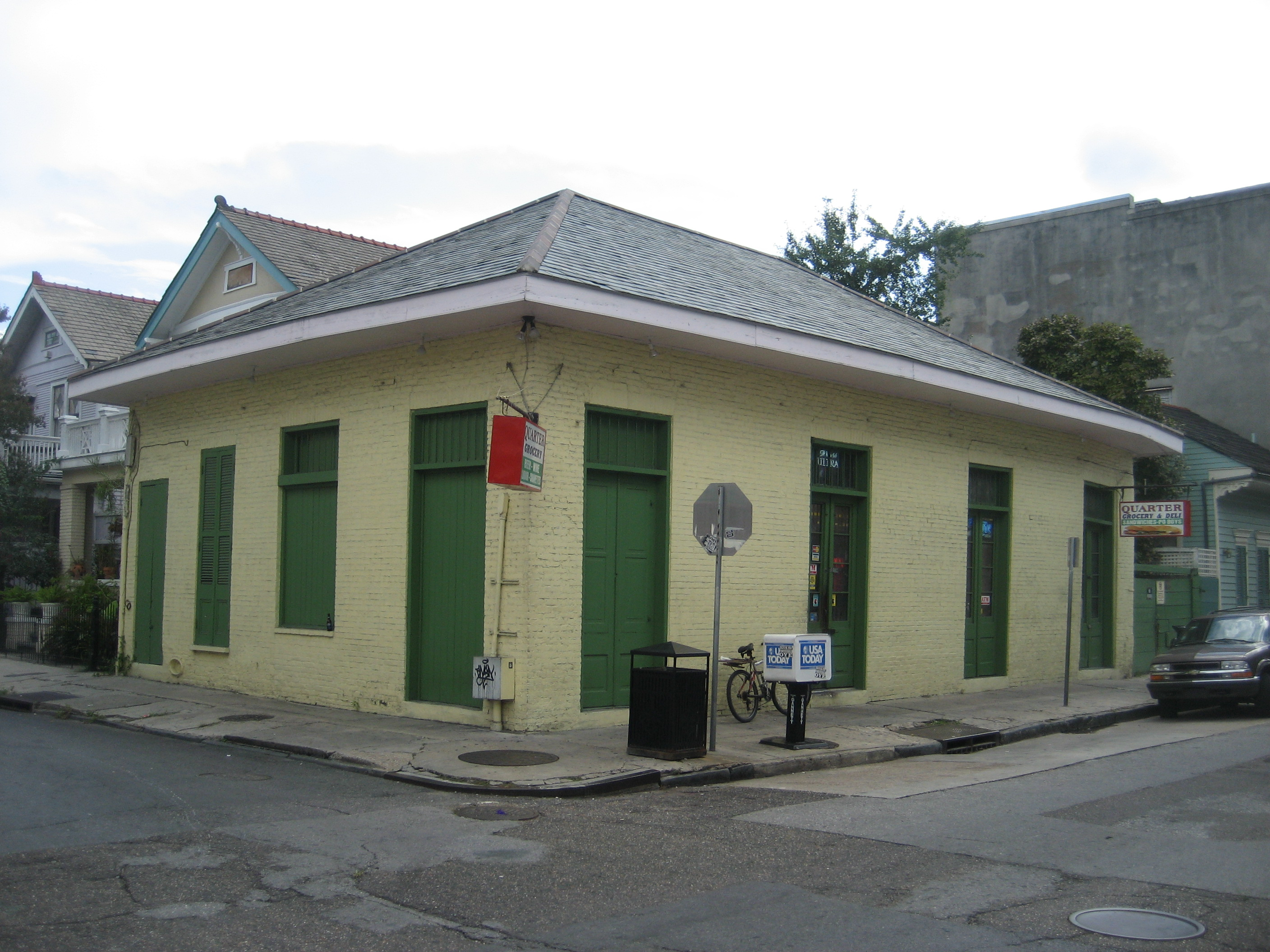
Example of a former corner grocery in New Orleans. Corner grocery stores became uncommon in the United States in the latter half of the 20th century.

=== Early history ===
The origin of the firm dates to the mid-19th century following the immigration of Garret Schwegmann Sr. from the Saxony region of Germany to New Orleans. After serving in the Union Army during the United States Civil War, Garret Schwegmann Sr. returned to New Orleans where he found employment at the Henke Family Grocery Store. After having married the daughter of the store owner and with a new family, Garret Schwegmann Sr. went into the grocery business for himself. Although the location of the store is in dispute, it may have been located at the corner of Dauphine Street and Almonaster Avenue (then known as Enghein Street). While successful as a grocer, Garret Schwegmann Sr. exited the grocery business and reentered it several times so that he could engage in other pursuits.

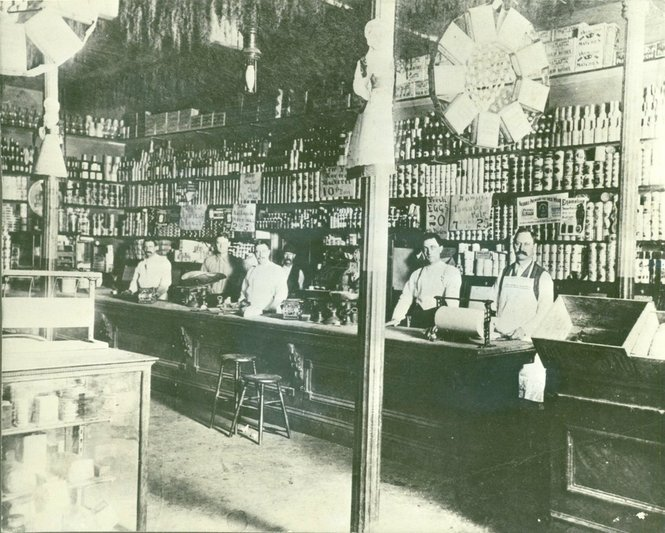
1895 photograph of the interior of the Schwegmann Grocery Store at the corner of Piety Street and Burgundy Street in New Orleans. Garret Jr. is at the far right and John Schwegmann Sr. is second from left.

Garret Schwegmann Sr.'s son Garret Schwegmann Jr. also entered the grocery business, working at various corner grocery stores in the New Orleans area, including Garret Schwegmann Sr.'s grocery store which was then located on Piety Street in New Orleans. On March 3, 1895, Garret Schwegmann Jr. purchased the store from his father and re-opened the store as G.A. Schwegmann Grocery Company. He managed the store with his brothers Henry Schwegmann and John Schwegmann.

As manager of the grocery store, Garret Schwegmann Jr. renovated the store and built a reputation in the local market for selling inexpensive goods. By the beginning of the 20th century, he renamed the enterprise Schwegmann Brothers Company.

Garret Schwegmann Jr. made changes in grocery store operations that contributed to the success of his enterprise. Most grocery stores in the latter part of the 19th century and early 20th century were mom and pop operations which commonly sold goods on credit to the customers. Garret Schwegmann Jr. eliminated this practice while instead offering consistently low prices. The store also offered delivery services. Other innovations included larger size of the store, greater selection, self-service (rather than full service), and a larger staff of employees. Their larger selection included fresh baked goods, seafood, and game meats. These were all uncommon practices at the corner grocery stories that dominated food sales in the early 20th century. Garret Schwegmann Jr. opened Schwegmann's Bar on property immediately adjacent to their Piety Street store in the Bywater District of New Orleans.

Garret Schwegmann Jr. invested in other businesses, especially New Orleans real estate. In 1939, he sold his grocery store to his brother John Schwegmann Sr.

=== John G. Schwegmann ===
John Gerald Schwegmann (1911–1995) was the nephew of Garret Schwegmann Jr. and the son of John Schwegmann Sr. Although he grew up in a family that worked in the grocery business, John Gerald Schwegmann worked for several years in other businesses including real estate and banking, when he was a young adult. By the early 1940s, Schwegmann realized that grocery retailing was undergoing significant change in the United States and that this represented an opportunity in the Metropolitan New Orleans area. Notable among these changes was the size of grocery stores, their selection, and their appeal to consumers with access to automobile transportation.

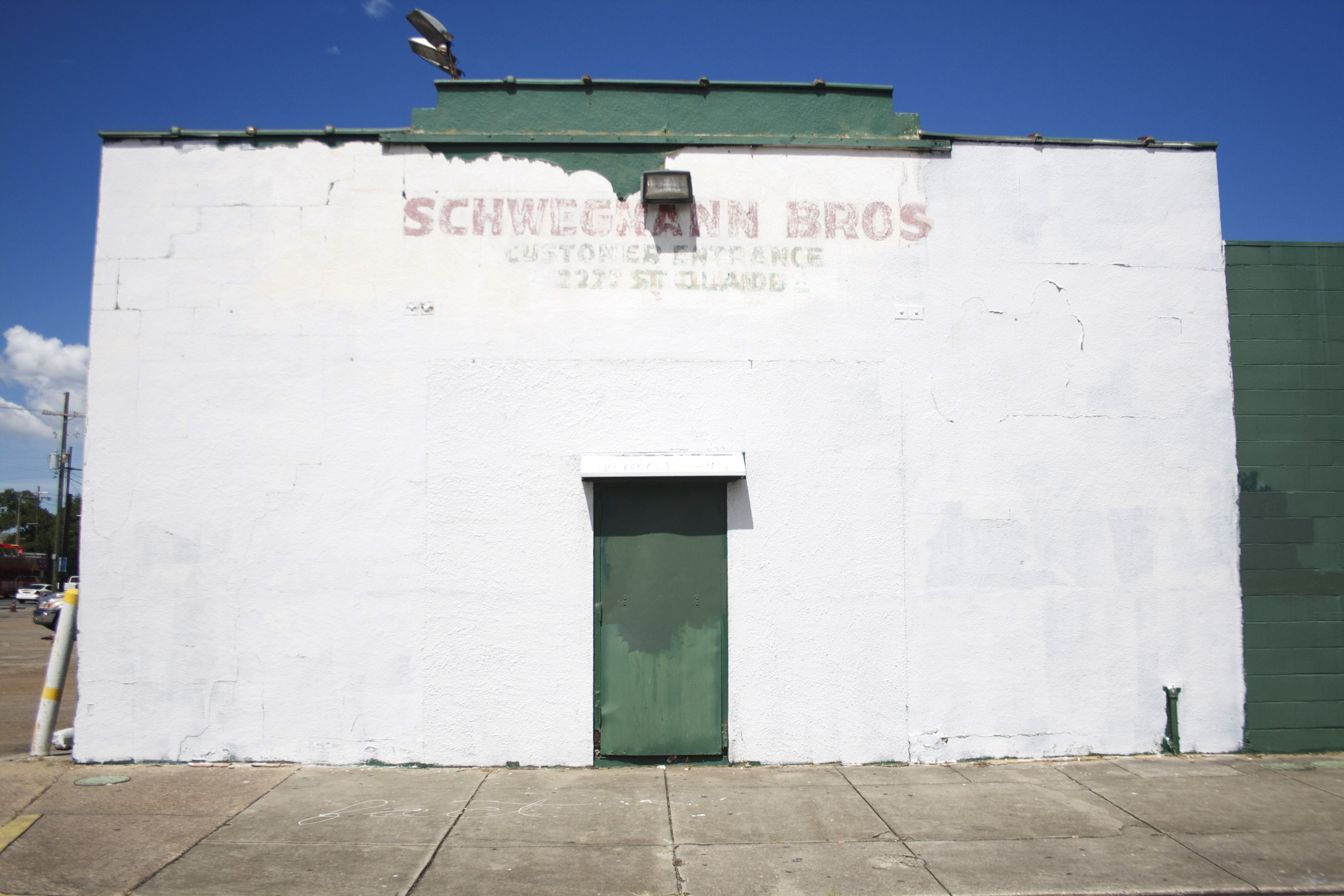
Schwegmann Bros. Giant Supermarket No. 1, on St. Claude Avenue in New Orleans, as seen in 2014

In 1943, John G. Schwegmann purchased land for US$18,000 at the intersection of St. Claude Avenue and Elysian Fields Avenue in New Orleans for the purpose of building a large grocery store. Construction was delayed because of materials shortages resulting from World War II. The project was self-funded, and John G. Schwegmann did much of the construction work himself, including the design, all with the assistance of his brother Paul Schwegmann, although they used specialty contractors for certain aspects of construction. The store opened on August 23, 1946, completing construction at a cost of $1.50 per square foot. This first store was 16,000 square feet, which was only somewhat larger than the average grocery store in the United States at the time (10,000 square feet).

John G. Schwegmann expanded his operations to develop a chain of supermarkets that operated in southeast Louisiana, principally the Greater New Orleans Metropolitan area. Unlike subsequent big box retailers, Schwegmann retained a strong regional loyalty and declined opportunities to further expand geographically.

Because of his interest in opposing price-fixing, Schwegmann pursued a career in local and state politics, which took him away from full time management of Schwegmann Brothers Giant Supermarkets. His political offices included terms in the Louisiana State Legislature and as Public Service Commissioner.

In 1978, John G. Schwegmann publicly described the business model for his stores, emphasizing everyday low prices, rapid turnover of inventory, and one-stop shopping. At the same time, he reiterated his commitment to exclusively serving the market of the Greater New Orleans Metropolitan area. He acknowledged the potential leverage that national chains could have.

Following his stroke in 1977, John G. Schwegmann withdrew from management of Schwegmann Brothers Giant Supermarkets.

=== John F. Schwegmann ===
John Francis Schwegmann is the son of John G. Schwegmann. He worked for Schwegmann Brothers Giant Supermarkets starting as a young adult, holding a variety of management positions. In 1979, John Francis Schwegmann purchased the grocery store chain from his father John Gerald Schwegmann. He then became the chief executive officer.

Later, John F. Schwegmann also became Public Service Commissioner, a role in which his father also served. John F. Schwegmann was chief executive when the firm acquired another grocery store chain, ultimately leading to the financial decline, sale of the firm, and final liquidation.

== Business practices ==
With the first store, Schwegmann and his partners emphasized return on investment rather than return on sales, which had been the conventional practice with corner grocery stores. To this end, Schwegmann emphasized low prices to enable high turnover of inventory. While the store was self-service, the store management continued to emphasize customer service, with clerks available in each department. The first store also had a liquor department, selling discounted liquor through self-service. The store maintained a loudspeaker system that announced phone calls for customers, arrivals of customers' taxis, and various merchandising specials. Early in the history of this first store, Schwegmann opened other departments that sold non-grocery goods, including drugs, cosmetics, hardware, sporting goods, housewares, and a snack bar. The initial store had approximately 250 shopping carts.

The firm's first store was financially successful almost from its beginning. By 1955, the store had annual sales of $5.13 per square foot compared to the national average of similarly sized supermarkets of $4.25 per square foot. It further had an average sale of $13.17 per transaction which was approximately double the national average for supermarkets at the time.

John G. Schwegmann's brothers Paul Schwegmann and Anthony Schwegmann were nominally partners in the business, although John G. Schwegmann was the dominant manager.

=== Expansion ===
On December 5, 1950, Schwegmann opened a second supermarket, one that was exceptionally large for its time. The store was located at 2701 Airline Highway in suburban Jefferson Parish, just outside of New Orleans. The store was 84,000 square feet, which was almost four times what retailers at the time believed was optimal size for a supermarket, making it the largest supermarket in the United States at the time of its opening. The design of the store was three contiguous quonset hut style of buildings with a common facade across all three structures, with no walls separating the three structures. While the building had minimal heating, it had a rooftop water-cooling system to keep customers comfortable during the oppressive heat and humidity that is typical of the region. Appealing to the emerging automobile culture and suburban expansion of the time, the store property included parking for 2000 cars. Schwegmann acquired loans to finance the project, leaving him sufficiently in debt that he could not develop a complete inventory for the store or purchase cash registers at the time of store opening. In 1952, Schwegmann opened a full-service pharmacy within the store that sold prescription drugs, a new practice in supermarkets at the time. The floor space of the store was fully occupied by 1955.

The new store on Airline Highway also leased out floor space to other retailers, further developing the one-stop-shopping experience that was uncommon in the early 1950s. The leased departments included dry goods, shoes and shoe repair, jewelry, consumer electronics, flowers, a locksmith, and a barbershop. The Schwegmann company itself also opened a snack bar and a barroom within the store, allowing consumers to consume alcoholic beverages while shopping.

By extending the business practices developed and refined at the original Schwegmann Brothers Giant Supermarket, the new Airline Highway supermarket became financially successful soon after its opening.

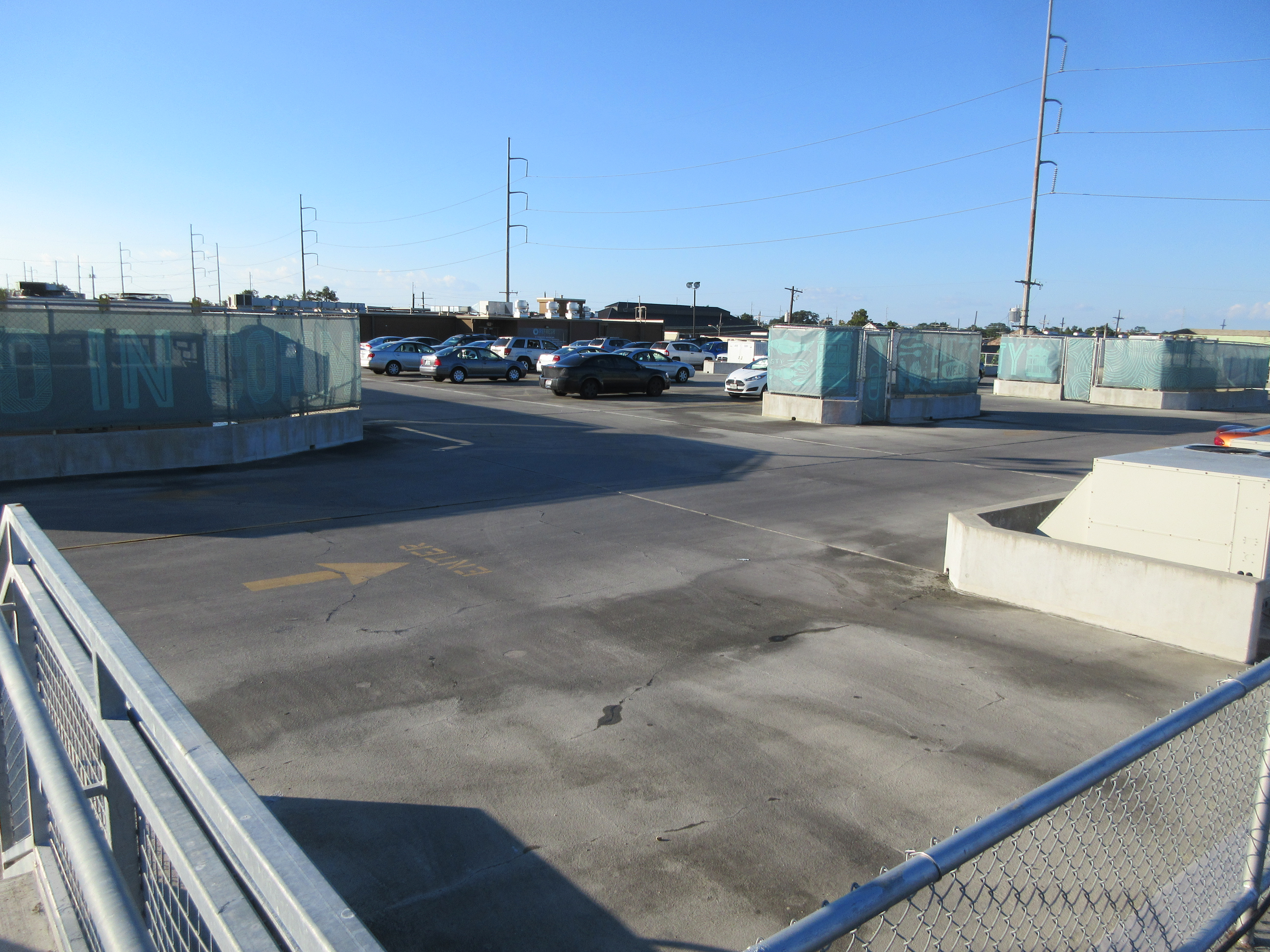
Rooftop parking at the former Schwegmann Brothers Giant Supermarket on North Broad Street in New Orleans

The chain's next major project was in the Gentilly section of New Orleans, which was an area undergoing rapid population growth at the time that Schwegmann Brothers Giant Supermarkets opened a store there. This store was located at 5300 Old Gentilly Road and was within the city limits of New Orleans, rather than suburban. To finance construction, the chain issued "Schwegmann bonds", which were often sold in small denominations to encourage potential customers of the store to help with finance. Through the sale of bonds, the chain was able to pay for the cost of construction, then by-far the largest of the chain's endeavors. The Gentilly store made use of the same merchandising practices as the previous store on Airline Highway only on a larger scale. The one-stop shopping experience was further expanded to include such services as a barbershop, dentist office, and a jewelry store.

As the number of stores in the chain increased, Schwegmann Brothers Giant Supermarkets contracted with architect Edward Mung-Yok Tsoi for further designs and improvements. One such design included roof top parking at the stores. The new architectural designs included new construction practices such as lift-slab construction in order to simplify construction. By 1995, the chain had 18 stores, with the Old Gentilly Road store remaining the chain's largest.

Schwegmann Brothers Giant Supermarkets' last stores opened in 1993.

=== Marketing ===
As a supermarket, Schwegmann Brothers Giant Supermarkets appealed to people of various socio-economic means. These offerings included low-priced foods and a range of regional cuisine. The chain sought to appeal to a culturally and economically diverse range of clientele. As part of their one-stop shopping strategy, the stores included banks, gasoline stations, a travel agency, and provisions for customers to pay utility bills.

The Schwegmann stores early in the operations made extensive use of scrambled merchandising in which customers would encounter unexpected products, typically at aisle end-caps or freestanding displays. The stores typically had specialty retailers selling wares within the stores on leased space. Stock items included many private label brands.

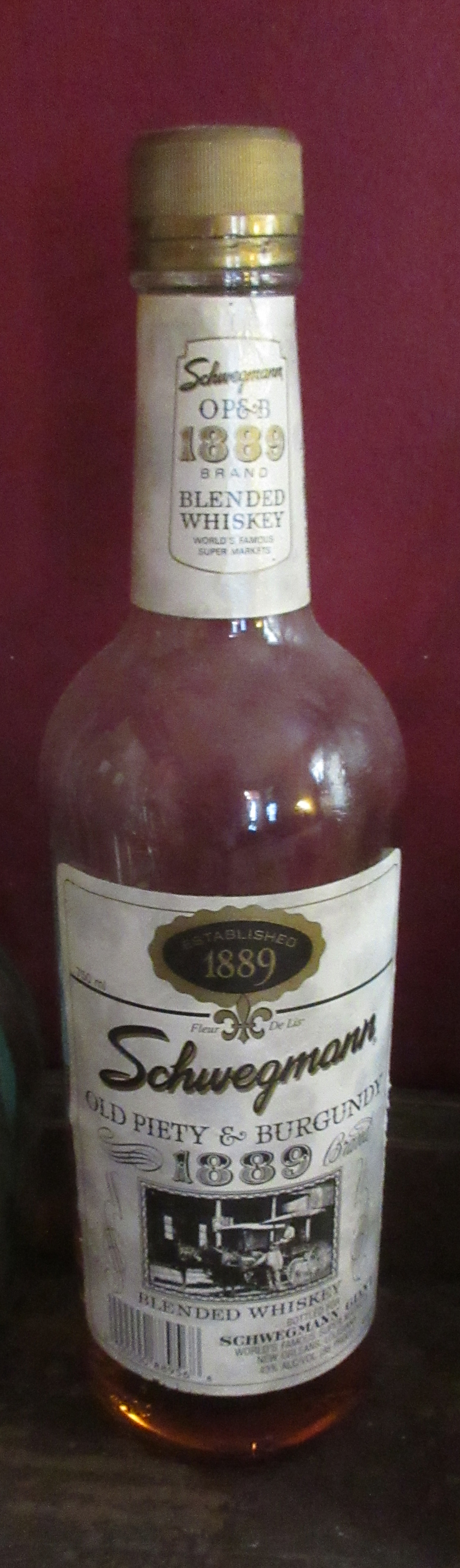
Bottle of Schwegmann's store-brand "1889" whiskey

Some private label brands were custom-made for the chain. An example was the "Old Piety and Burgundy 1889" brand, which was 35% aged whiskey and 65% rectified spirit. By 1978, the chain offered approximately 30 private label brands, although they also carried most major national brands.

As part of the shopping experience, Schwegmann Brothers Giant Supermarkets permitted shoppers to purchase draft beer and consume it while shopping within the store.

An advertising jingle that Schwegmann Brothers Giant Supermarkets used in the 1980s built on the regional colloquialism in New Orleans English of "making groceries", as opposed to "grocery shopping" or "buying groceries":

"Saving money with a smile,
Makin' groceries Schwegmann style."

Schwegmann's used their paper grocery bags to provide advertorials, which were usually either human interest stories or advocacy statements. Often the advertorials were endorsements for political candidates.

In the late 1980s, Schwegmann Brothers Giant Supermarkets ran a series of Schwegmann Food Shows, taking place at the Louisiana Superdome, on an annual basis. Attendees typically received a significant number of discount coupons to further encourage shopping at the Schwegmann stores.

=== Consumer advocacy ===
At the time that Schwegmann Brothers Giant Supermarkets came into existence, price fixing in retail markets was a common practice. These also took the form of fair trade laws, which was price-fixing by the state government. There was also top down pricing at the time, which was also known as retail price maintenance. John G. Schwegmann perceived this as being neither in the interest of his business nor in his customers' interest.

Early in the history of Schwegmann Brothers Giant Supermarkets, the store sold liquor at lower prices than what were mandated by the liquor producers. Beginning in 1949, John G. Schwegmann challenged the various price fixing schemes through both the legal system and through public opinion. These challenges concerned price-fixing on liquor, prescription medications, and dairy products. With the protection of the State of Louisiana's Alcoholic Beverage Control Board, retailers were required to mark-up liquor prices from 15% to 50%, depending on the type of alcoholic beverage.

Schwegmann's discounted pricing practice was challenged by Calvert Distillers Corporation and by Seagram Distillers Corporation. While various court cases were decided against Schwegmann, he prevailed in a 1951 decision by the United States Supreme Court. Specifically, the U.S. Supreme Court overturned the Miller-Tydings Act of 1937 that allowed price fixing and which Schwegmann challenged through legal actions.

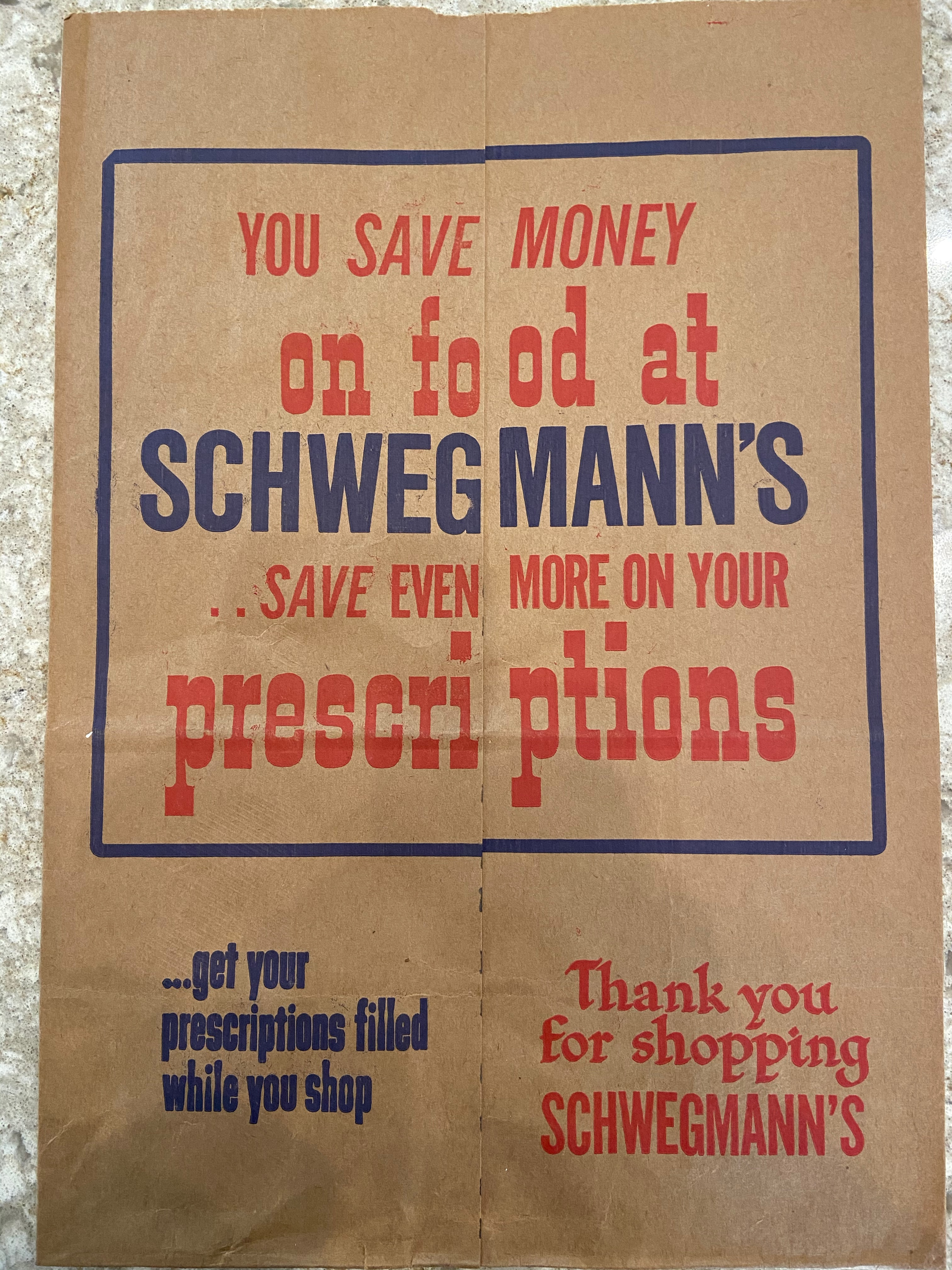
Schwegmann Brothers Giant Supermarkets shopping bag with an advertorial for discounted prescription drug prices

In 1952, the United States Congress passed the McGuire-Keogh Act which allowed prescription drug manufacturers and manufacturers in other industries to set retail prices of their products.

In 1953, the pharmaceutical company Eli Lilly and Company pursued legal action against Schwegmann Brothers Giant Supermarkets because the chain's pharmacies were selling insulin, an essential drug for people with certain conditions, below the retail price set by Eli Lilly. Specifically, at that time, Schwegmann's pharmacy was selling insulin at $2.08 per unit, compared to $2.83 per unit which was the price set by Eli Lilly. Schwegmann Brothers Giant Supermarkets published an advertorial at the time stating:

"We take orders from our customers, not from price-fixers. We are being accused of selling some 2,000 'Fair-Traded' items too cheap...To that accusation we plead guilty to the 'crime' of selling every item everyday at the lowest possible price. Our contempt for the un-American price fixing 'Fair Trade' system is only exceeded by our determination to save money for our customers."

Other drug manufacturers besides Eli Lilly challenged Schwegmann Brothers Giant Supermarkets with legal proceedings. These included: Hoffmann-LaRoche, Sterling Drug, Colgate Palmolive, Johnson & Johnson, Bristol-Myers, and Mennen. The fair trade laws governing pharmaceuticals at the time covered branded products. Schwegmann Brothers Giant Supermarkets were thereby obligated to comply with fair trade pricing concerning over-the-counter drugs. Prescription drugs at the time were typically sold with the name of the pharmacy and not branded. Schwegmann Brothers Giant Supermarkets thereby continued to sell at below mandated prices. They further advertised prescription drug prices, which was an uncommon practice in the 1950s in the United States. Schwegmann Brothers Giant Supermarkets received a favorable ruling against fixed prices for prescription drugs in 1956 in a decision by the Louisiana Supreme Court.

Despite court rulings concerning liquor pricing and drug pricing that were favorable to Schwegmann Brothers Giant Supermarkets, the pricing of dairy products in Louisiana continued to favor producers over consumers and retailers. In Louisiana starting in the 1950s, the retail prices of dairy products were determined by the state's Commissioner of Agriculture, at 8% above baseline costs. Initially, John G. Schwegmann challenged then-pending price-fixing legislation before the Louisiana State Legislature. After the legislation passed, Schwegmann Brothers Giant Supermarkets sold dairy products as a store brand, arguing that their pricing was consistent with state pricing requirements. The chain also purchased dairy products from out-of-state dairy producers and sold these as retail products in their stores. Court decisions concluded that out-of-state purchase of dairy products was not subject to Louisiana's pricing requirements. John G. Schwegmann pursued a career in elected political office to oppose the price-fixing laws. The legal proceedings continued for the duration of the time the chain was in business. As of 2013, pricing of dairy products remained politically controversial in Louisiana.

=== Bankruptcy ===
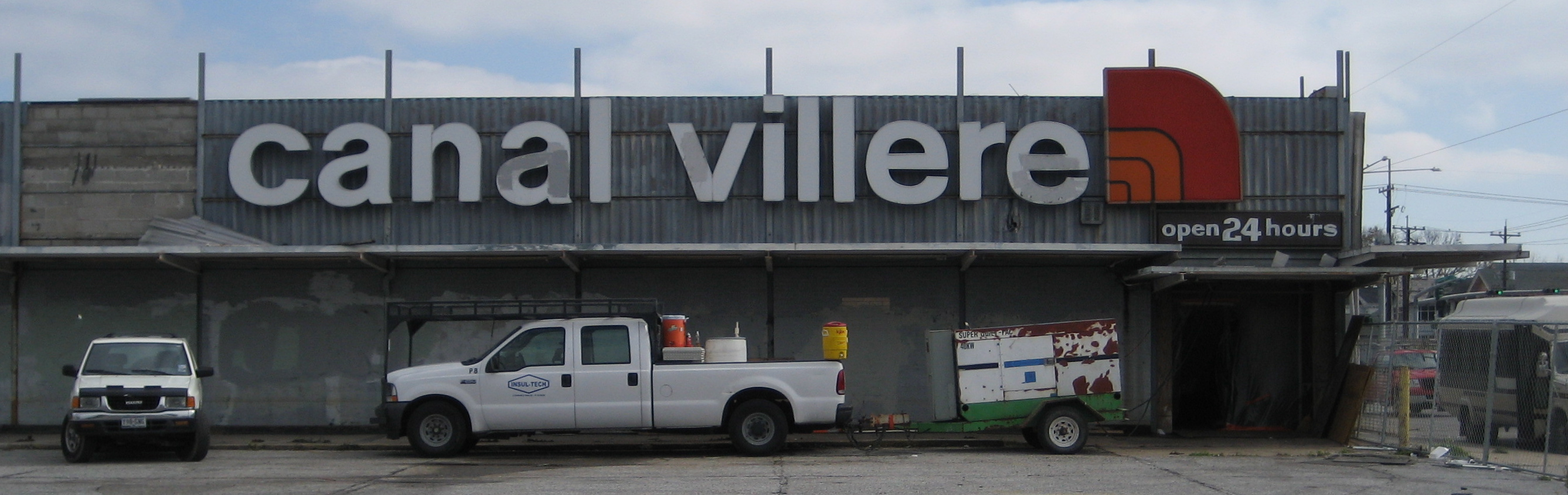
Defunct National Canal Villere store in New Orleans, which was acquired by Schwegmann prior to Schwegmann's acquisition by Kohlberg

In 1978, sales of the ten stores in the chain totaled approximately US$250 million. By the late 1980s, Schwegmann Brothers Giant Supermarkets averaged 36% to 38% of the grocery market in the Greater New Orleans Metropolitan area. Annual sales in 1989 were US$455 million. As non-local competition became more significant in the local market, annual sales of Schwegmann Brothers Giant Supermarkets declined over the subsequent decade to about US$289 million in 1998, despite having more stores in the chain. They were third in local market share behind two supermarket chains based outside of the Greater New Orleans Metropolitan area.

In 1995, Schwegmann Brothers Giant Supermarkets acquired the 28 grocery stores in the New Orleans Metropolitan Area of the National Canal Villere Chain, then owned by the National Tea Company. The purchase price was US$150 million, which caused the Schwegmann chain to have cash flow limitations. Their inventory and service quality declined following the acquisition, from which the firm did not recover. In 1997, Schwegmann Brothers Giant Supermarkets was sold to Kohlberg Kravis Roberts & Company, a firm that specialized in returning distressed corporate operations to profitability. Despite the new owner's efforts, Schwegmann Brothers Giant Supermarkets declared bankruptcy in 1999 and permanently ceased operations.

== Legacy ==
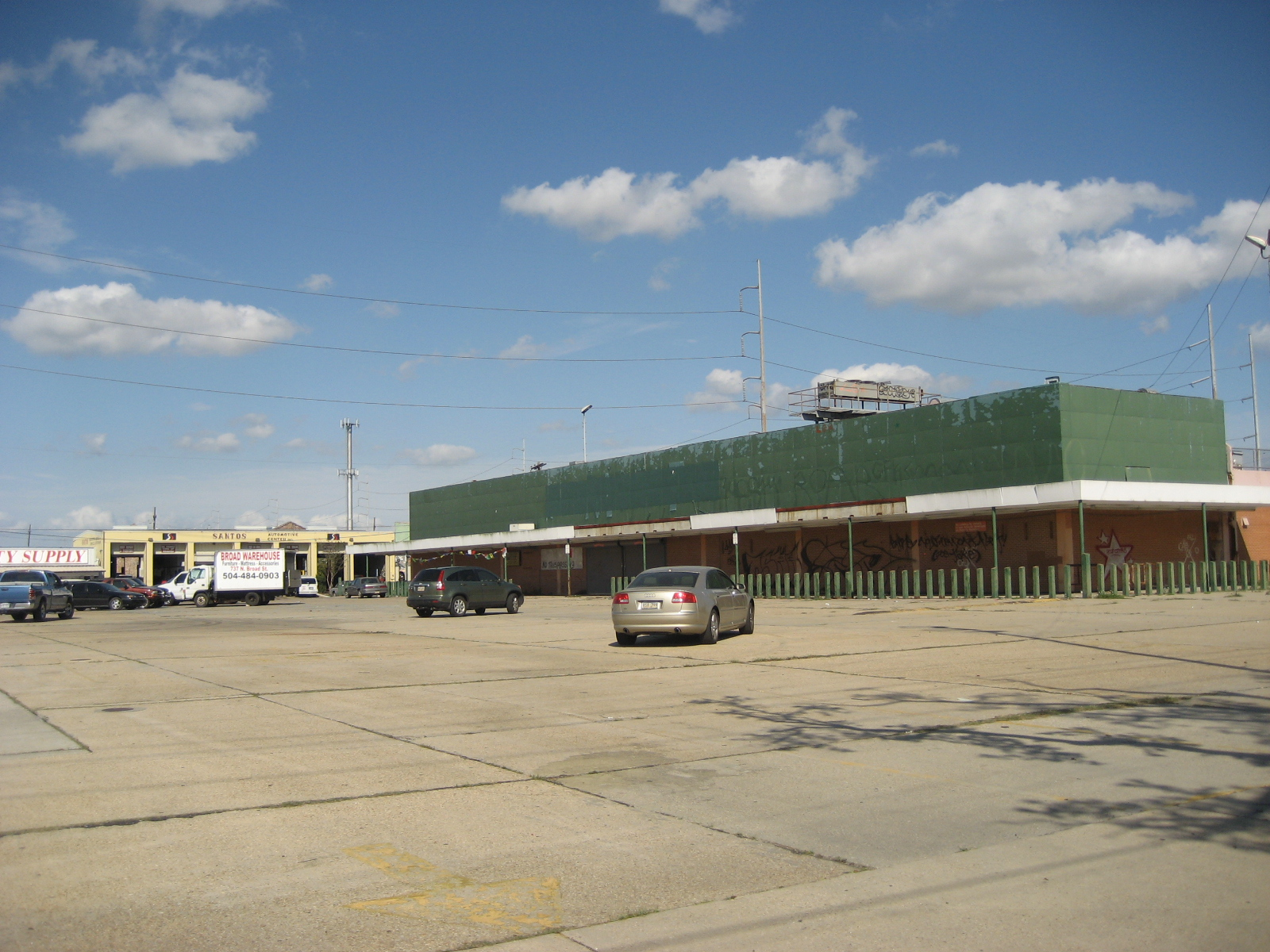
Derelict Schwegmann Brothers Giant Supermarket store, as seen in 2011. The store building was briefly occupied by another food retailer.

Schwegmann Brothers Giant Supermarkets had legacy both regionally and in retailing across the United States. The supermarkets in the chain were early prototypes for big box retailers that emerged in the latter part of the 20th century, with broad selections and everyday low pricing. Unlike subsequent big box retailers, the chain's business practices were based on a connection to the local community that was mutually beneficial to the chain's owners and to its customers.

== See also ==
- John G. Schwegmann
- List of defunct retailers of the United States
- Melinda Schwegmann
