= National Supermarkets =

Defunct American grocery store chain

- Founded: 1899; 127 years ago
- Defunct: 1999; 27 years ago
- Products: Groceries

National Supermarkets was a grocery chain in both the St. Louis, Missouri, and New Orleans, Louisiana, areas of the United States. Both firms were owned by Loblaw Companies of Canada; however, in June 1995, they were sold by Loblaw to Schnucks Markets. Immediately after that, per the FTC, Schnucks sold the National New Orleans division to Schwegmann Brothers Giant Supermarkets of Metairie, Louisiana, which later sold them to Great A&P, which finally sold them to Rouse Markets in 2007. National itself had cemented the number two spot in St. Louis by acquiring several former Kroger locations and the Kroger distribution center in the market when the latter exited St. Louis in 1986. Kroger and National had been battling for the number two and three spots since the 1970s, swapping rankings several times over throughout the 1970s and 1980s.

New Orleans and St. Louis represented the last two divisions of National Supermarkets, a.k.a. National Tea, which originated in Chicago in 1899, making the chain one of the oldest in the USA. It was also one of the largest, ranking as the fifth largest in the late 1960s, only A&P, Safeway, Kroger, and Food Fair were larger. Loblaw bought the company in 1955. Among the chains National acquired were Miller's (Denver), Standard (Indianapolis), and Applebaum's (Minneapolis-St. Paul). Besides the National and Standard banners, Big D and Del Farm banners were used in the Midwest and That Stanley! was used in the South.

At its height, National's footprint extended from western Pennsylvania to Colorado. The chain had stores in Denver, Sioux Falls, Minneapolis-St. Paul, Milwaukee, Pittsburgh, the Quad Cities, Indianapolis, Chicago, Youngstown, Memphis, and Nashville. It was the largest supermarket chain serving the Mississippi Valley. Major rivals included Jewel, Red Owl, Bettendorf-Rapp (Allied), Kroger, A&P, Dominick's, Eagle Food Centers, Hy-Vee, Marsh, Winn-Dixie, Hill's, Fisher/Fazio's/Costa, Thorofare, King Soopers, Albertsons, and Safeway, depending on the market.

National's logo was Loblaw's logo turned upside down to look like an "n" instead of an "L".

== Slogans ==
At the height of their market share in the late 1960s, National Supermarkets' slogans used in television advertising included "Super National-Market" and "The Underpricer". In their final years in the 1980s and early 1990s, the National slogan in the St. Louis market was, "You're Important to Us!"

== Failed resurrection ==
As a condition of buying National from Loblaws, Schnucks had to sell off 24 stores for anti-trust reasons. In 1996, Family Company of America, a group led by Belleville, Illinois, financial consultant James R. Gibson, bought 23 stores from Schnucks and reopened them under the name National Markets. However, the new National was unable to make much headway against Schnucks, despite a "Great Grocery Giveaway" promotion where random customers had their day's shopping given to them free of charge; the chain disappeared for good in April 1999.

After the bankruptcy, it emerged that Gibson had financed the purchase with money embezzled from 183 clients of his investment company, among them orphans, accident victims who trusted Gibson to invest money from their settlements, and disabled people who trusted him with their life savings. In 2005, Gibson was sentenced to 40 years in prison for his crimes. He will not be eligible for release until 2036, when he will be 91 years old.

== National Supermarket murders ==
Shortly after closing on September 4, 1987, at the National Supermarket at 4331 Natural Bridge Avenue in St. Louis, two men disguised as the cleaning crew made their way into the store where employees were preparing for the next day. They shot seven employees execution-style as they laid on the floor, killing five. It remains one of the worst mass murders in St. Louis history.

== National Supermarkets—New Orleans division ==
At the end of 1994, National operated 28 stores in the New Orleans area (in Louisiana, Mississippi, and Alabama) under the following names:

- National
- Canal Villere
- Superstore
- That Stanley!
- The Real Superstore
- The Real Superstore Express
- The Real Uptown Superstore

The former "Real Uptown Superstore" building is still in operation as a Rouses supermarket.

Denham Springs, Louisiana, also had a National Supermarket (#18) that was simply known as "Superstore." The building is now a home furnishings store.
