= Melinda Schwegmann =

American politician

Member of the Louisiana House of Representatives from the 98th district
- In office March 30, 1998 – March 29, 2004
- Preceded by: Garey Forster
- Succeeded by: Cheryl Gray

49th Lieutenant Governor of Louisiana
- In office January 13, 1992 – January 8, 1996
- Governor: Edwin Edwards
- Preceded by: Paul Hardy
- Succeeded by: Kathleen Blanco

35th Chair of the National Lieutenant Governors Association
- In office 1994–1995
- Preceded by: Joanell Dyrstad
- Succeeded by: Joy Corning

Personal details
- Born: October 25, 1946 (age 79) Austin, Texas, U.S.
- Party: Republican (since 2003); Democratic (before 2003)
- Spouse: John F. Schwegmann
- Relations: John G. Schwegmann (father-in-law)
- Children: 3

Melinda Burge Schwegmann (born October 25, 1946) is an American politician. In 1991, outspending incumbent Paul Hardy by almost two to one in total and being in a runoff with him with David Duke at the top of the Louisiana GOP ticket, she defeated him overwhelmingly to become the first woman to serve as the lieutenant governor of Louisiana and was in office from 1992 to 1996. While in office, she was a proponent of the arts and culture in the state.

She ran unsuccessfully in the 1995 Louisiana gubernatorial election. She was, along with her opponent Mary Landrieu, the first woman to have a serious chance of winning the office. She finished in 6th place out of the 15 running in that year's jungle primary.

In 1997, she celebrated her 51st birthday by winning a seat in the Louisiana House of Representatives. She filled the unexpired term of Garey Forster. She served until 2003, when she switched her political party from a Democrat to become a Republican and ran again for Lt. Governor. Spending less than one-fourth of what she spent the year she was elected, she lost, coming in third place.

She is married to John F. Schwegmann. Through marriage, Schwegmann became a member of the family of grocery retailers that owned Schwegmann Brothers Giant Supermarkets.

== Works cited ==
- Wall, Bennett H.; Rodrigue, John C. (January 28, 2014). Louisiana: A History. John Wiley & Sons. ISBN 978-1-118-61929-2.

Party political offices
Preceded by Robert Louis Freeman Sr.	Democratic nominee for Lieutenant Governor of Louisiana; 1991	Succeeded by Kathleen Blanco
