= United States v. Apple (2012) =

US antitrust case concerning price fixing of e-books

United States v. Apple Inc.
- Court: United States District Court for the Southern District of New York
- Full case name: United States v. Apple Inc., et al.; The State of Texas, et al., v. Penguin Group Inc., et al.
- Decided: July 10, 2013
- Docket nos.: 1:12-cv-02826
- Citation: 952 F. Supp. 2d 638

Case history
- Subsequent actions: Affirmed, 791 F.3d 290 (2d Cir. 2015); cert. denied, 136 S. Ct. 1376 (2016).

Holding
- Apple is in violation of the Sherman Act

Court membership
- Judge sitting: Denise Cote

Keywords
- Sherman Act

United States v. Apple Inc., 952 F. Supp. 2d 638 (S.D.N.Y. 2013), was a US antitrust case in which the Court held that Apple conspired to raise the price of e-books in violation of the Sherman Act.

The suit, filed in April 2012, alleged that Apple and five book publishing companies conspired to raise and fix the price for e-books in violation of Section 1 of the Sherman Antitrust Act. The publishers are Hachette Book Group, HarperCollins publishers, Macmillan publishers, Penguin Group, and Simon & Schuster (collectively referred to as the Publisher Defendants). Only Apple proceeded to trial, while the Publisher Defendants settled the claims against them.

== Background ==
The Publisher Defendants sold over 48% of all e-books in the U.S. in the first quarter of 2010. The Publisher Defendants along with Random House Publishing are the six largest publishers in the United States (collectively the publishers) and are often referred to as the "Big Six" in the publishing industry. In 2009 Amazon had nearly 90% of the e-books industry. Amazon charged $9.99 for certain new releases and bestselling e-books which helped make it the market leader in the sale of e-books and e-readers with its Kindle.

Amazon's price point caused discontent among the publishers. The publishers believed that the low price point was a problem for their sales of more profitable hardcover books. Approximately every three months, the CEOs of the Big Six would meet in private dining rooms in New York restaurants "without counsel or assistant present, in order to discuss the common challenges they faced, including most prominently Amazon's pricing policies." The publishers used several different strategies to fight against Amazon's pricing point, including selling e-books for the same price as their printed version through a continued wholesale model and "windowing" new releases. Windowing is a tactic that would delay the release of books to their e-book form for a certain window of time.

Apple planned to unveil the iPad on January 27, 2010, and ship the device in early April 2010. Apple also hoped to announce its new iBookstore at launch and include content in it from the major publishers.

== Facts ==
Beginning on December 8, 2009, Apple's senior VP of Internet Software and Services, Eddy Cue, contacted the publishers to set up meetings for the following week. During the meetings Cue suggested that Apple would sell the majority of e-books between $9.99 and $14.99, with new releases being $12.99 to $14.99. Apple also adopted the agency model which it used in its App Store for distribution of e-books. This let publishers control the price of the e-books with Apple receiving a 30% commission. Apple also set up price tiers for different books. Apple included a MFN clause in their contract with the publishers which allowed for Apple to sell e-books at its competitors' lowest price.

Amazon learned about the coming deals between the publishers and Apple on January 18, 2010. In response, Amazon appealed directly to authors and encouraged disintermediation, the act of reducing intermediaries between producers and consumers (i.e. allowing for authors to directly sell to consumers). Authors could choose a "new 70 percent royalty option" for e-books with a list price "between $2.99 and $9.99." The Big Six publishers called each other over 100 times in the week before signing the agreement. Steve Jobs even emailed James Murdoch, HarperCollins' parent company News Corp's CEO, to persuade him to have HarperCollins join.

On the day of the launch, Jobs was asked by a reporter why people would pay $14.99 for a book in the iBookstore when they could purchase it for $9.99 from Amazon. In response Jobs stated that "The price will be the same... publishers are actually withholding their books from Amazon because they are not happy." By stating this, Jobs acknowledged his understanding that the publishers would raise e-book prices and that Apple would not have to face any competition from Amazon on price.

Shortly after January 31, Amazon sent a letter to the Federal Trade Commission complaining about the simultaneous nature of the demands for agency model agreements from the publishers who had signed with Apple. By March, Amazon had completed agency agreements with four of the five publishers. During the negotiations over the agreements, the publishers would talk with each other and share information about what Amazon would concede with each. Apple was closely following all of this progress and Cue was in contact with the publishers. After Amazon's move to the agency model, there was "an average per unit e-book retail price increase of 14.2% for their new releases, 42.7% for their New York Times Bestsellers, and 18.6% across all of the Publisher Defendants' e-books." The publishers also raised the price of some of their new release hardcover books so as to move the e-book versions into a correspondingly higher price tier. Amazon saw Random House (who for the moment had not joined Apple) e-book sales having an increase of 41%. Two studies showed that the publishers who moved to agency model sold over 10% fewer units at major retailers. In contrast, other publishers' sales increased 5.4% in the same period. In January 2011, Random House also moved to the agency model and raised the prices of its e-books, and then experienced a decline in its e-book sales. This allowed Random House to join the iBookstore.

== Decision ==
=== Sherman Act ===
Section 1 of the Sherman Act outlaws "every contract, combination ..., or conspiracy, in restraint of trade or commerce among the several States." To show that there is violation of Section 1 of the Sherman Act proof of joint or concerted action is required as was shown in Monsanto Co. v. Spray-Rite Service Corp. The plaintiffs must show

1. "a combination or some form of concerted action between at least two legally distinct economic entities" that
2. "constituted an unreasonable restraint of trade either per se or under the rule of reason."

In Monsanto, the Court also described how "Circumstances must reveal a unity of purpose or a common design and understanding, or a meeting of minds in an unlawful arrangement." Section 1 outlaws only unreasonable restraints of trade through either illegal per se agreements or the rule of reason. For illegal per se agreements plaintiffs must show that a contract or contracts are "unreasonable and anti-competitive before it will be found unlawful" (Texaco Inc. v. Dagher). Under the rule of reason "the plaintiffs bear an initial burden to demonstrate the defendants' challenged behavior had an actual adverse effect on competition as a whole in the relevant market."

=== Apple's arguments ===
Apple asserted that it is entitled to a verdict in its favor since the evidence does not "tend to exclude" the possibility that Apple acted in a manner consistent with its lawful business interests. This relies on the Supreme Court's decision in Monsanto. The defendant argued that it never intended to conspire to raise e-book prices. Apple argued that the plaintiffs have failed to show that the publishers actually "increased" e-book prices. This is because had Amazon not adopted the agency model, the publishers would have simply withheld e-books from Amazon. Apple also argued that their conduct must be analyzed under the rule of reason. Finally, Apple argued that should the plaintiffs win a verdict in their favor, this would set a dangerous precedent and will discourage business from entering other markets.

=== Analysis of evidence ===
The Court found that a large amount of evidence showed that the publisher defendants joined with each other in a horizontal price-fixing conspiracy. There was sufficient evidence to show that Apple violated Section 1 of the Sherman Act by conspiring with the publishers to eliminate retail price competition and raise the price of e-books. The evidence showed that Apple was a knowing and active member of the conspiracy. The plaintiff proved a per se violation of the Sherman Act.

=== Rulings ===
In July 2013, US District Court judge Denise Cote found Apple guilty of conspiring to raise the retail price of e-books and scheduled a trial for 2014 to determine damages. In June 2014, Apple settled the e-book antitrust case out of court with the States; however still appealed Judge Cote's initial ruling. In June 2015, the 2nd US Circuit Court of Appeals, by a 2–1 vote, concurred with Judge Cote that Apple conspired to e-book price fixing and violated federal antitrust law. Apple appealed the decision. In March 2016, the Supreme Court of the United States declined to hear Apple's appeal that it conspired to e-book price fixing therefore the previous court decision stands, which meant Apple was required to pay $450 million.

== Significance ==
In this case, the court applied the per se doctrine to vertical pricing conduct which had not been the doctrine since Leegin Creative Leather Products, Inc. v. PSKS, Inc. The Supreme Court in Leegin suggested that vertical conduct be judged independently under the rule of reason even in the presence of both vertical and horizontal parties. This may lead to more stringent antitrust treatment to actors in vertical relationships.

== See also ==
- Monsanto Co. v. Spray-Rite Service Corp.
- Leegin Creative Leather Products, Inc. v. PSKS, Inc.
- Texaco Inc. v. Dagher
- Net Book Agreement (United Kingdom)
- Apple Inc. litigation
- Big Tech
