= United States v. Colgate & Co. =

- Supreme Court of the United States

Argued March 10, 1919 Decided June 2, 1919
- Full case name: United States v. Colgate & Co.
- Citations: 250 U.S. 300 (more) 39 S. Ct. 465; 63 L. Ed. 992; 7 A.L.R. 443

Case history
- Prior: Demurrer sustained, 253 F. 522 (E.D. Va. 1918).

Holding
- Colgate did not violate the Sherman Act when it cut off agreements with retailers.

Court membership
- Chief Justice Edward D. White Associate Justices Joseph McKenna · Oliver W. Holmes Jr. William R. Day · Willis Van Devanter; Mahlon Pitney · James C. McReynolds; Louis Brandeis · John H. Clarke

Case opinion
- Majority: McReynolds

Laws applied
- Sherman Antitrust Act

United States v. Colgate & Co., 250 U.S. 300 (1919), is a United States antitrust law case in which the United States Supreme Court noted that a company has the power to decide with whom to do business. Per the Colgate Doctrine, a company may unilaterally terminate business with any other company without triggering a violation of the antitrust laws.

This case created an exception to vertical price restraints in vertical agreements. According to the ruling, resale price maintenance is generally illegal per se, but if a supplier merely says it will not deal with resellers that charge less than the supplier's stipulated price, the supplier need not deal with such a retailer. This is a narrow exception, as companies are still prohibited from threatening or warning price-cutters.

== Background ==
The case arose from a federal indictment charging Colgate & Company with violating the Sherman Antitrust Act by engaging in an unlawful combination with wholesale and retail dealers to maintain resale prices for its products. The indictment alleged that Colgate distributed price lists, urged dealers to adhere to specified resale prices, investigated dealers who sold below those prices, and refused to continue supplying dealers who failed to comply. The government alleged that these practices suppressed competition among wholesalers and retailers and maintained resale prices throughout interstate commerce. The trial court sustained Colgate's demurrer, concluding that the indictment failed to charge an offense under the Sherman Act. The Supreme Court reviewed only the legal interpretation of the statute, not the lower court's construction of the indictment's factual allegations.

== Trial court judgment ==
The trial court sustained Colgate's demurrer to the indictment, concluding that the allegations did not charge an offense under the Sherman Antitrust Act. The court noted that the indictment did not allege any contract between Colgate and its retail customers restraining interstate commerce, but instead alleged that Colgate created a combination with wholesale and retail dealers by obtaining assurances and promises that they would adhere to resale prices fixed by the company. In the court's view, the indictment presented the question of whether a manufacturer could be criminally prosecuted for agreeing with dealers on reasonable resale prices and refusing to sell to those who would not follow those prices.

The court emphasized that the indictment did not allege that Colgate and its customers entered into any agreement binding them to maintain prices, beyond the circumstance that Colgate refused to sell to dealers who would not resell at indicated prices and that some dealers accepted those terms. It found no allegation that Colgate retained any interest in goods after sale or restricted dealers' ability to resell products at any price. Because retailers remained free to sell, give away, or retain the products as they chose, and because there was no allegation of an agreement among retailers or concerted action between Colgate and its customers, the court concluded that Colgate's refusal to continue dealing with noncompliant customers was a lawful exercise of its control over its own property.

The court recognized that a manufacturer could not use fraudulent or unlawful combinations to restrain trade, but held that a manufacturer acting independently and in good faith could refuse to sell its products or choose the terms under which it would deal with customers. It therefore held that the alleged conduct did not constitute an unlawful restraint of trade under the Sherman Act.

== Supreme Court ==
The Supreme Court first considered the interpretation that the trial court had placed on the indictment, rather than interpreting the indictment independently. The government argued that the trial court had understood the indictment as charging an unlawful combination under Dr. Miles Medical Co. v. Park & Sons Co.. Colgate argued that the trial court had instead construed the indictment as alleging only that Colgate independently established resale prices and refused to deal with dealers who would not follow them.

The Court accepted Colgate's interpretation of the trial court's decision. It emphasized the trial court's statement that retailers remained free to sell their purchases at any price, give them away, or decline to sell them, and that their only consequence for disregarding Colgate's prices was the possibility that Colgate would refuse further sales. The Court therefore concluded that the indictment, as construed by the trial court, did not allege that Colgate had entered into agreements with dealers requiring them to maintain resale prices. The Court affirmed the judgment without reaching the broader question of the legality of resale price maintenance arrangements.

The Court said that the purpose of the Sherman Antitrust Act was to prohibit monopolies, contracts, and combinations that unduly interfered with the freedom to trade. In the absence of an intent to create or maintain a monopoly, the Act did not restrict a manufacturer engaged in a private business from exercising discretion as to parties with whom he will deal.

== Later developments ==
The Colgate doctrine continued to influence the interpretation of § 5 of the Federal Trade Commission Act. In Official Airline Guides, Inc. v. FTC (1980), the United States Court of Appeals for the Second Circuit relied on Colgate in holding that, absent a purpose to create or maintain a monopoly, even a monopolist generally retains the right to choose with whom it will deal. The court declined the FTC's invitation to extend § 5 to reach a unilateral refusal to deal that allegedly affected competition in a related market, concluding that doing so would give the Commission excessive discretion to substitute its own business judgment for that of the firm.

== See also ==
- Unilateral Policy
