= Albrecht v. Herald Co. =

- Supreme Court of the United States

Argued November 9, 1967 Decided March 4, 1968
- Full case name: Lester J. Albrecht v. Herald Co., DBA Globe-Democrat Publishing Co.
- Citations: 390 U.S. 145 (more) 88 S. Ct. 869; 19 L. Ed. 2d 998

Case history
- Prior: Certiorari to the United States Court of Appeals for the Eighth Circuit

Holding
- Wholesalers cannot require franchisees and retailers of their products to sell items at a certain price.

Court membership
- Chief Justice Earl Warren Associate Justices Hugo Black · William O. Douglas; John M. Harlan II · William J. Brennan Jr. Potter Stewart · Byron White; Abe Fortas · Thurgood Marshall

Case opinions
- Majority: White, joined by Warren, Black, Douglas, Brennan, Fortas, Marshall
- Concurrence: Douglas
- Dissent: Harlan
- Dissent: Stewart, joined by Harlan

Laws applied
- Clayton Antitrust Act, 15 U.S.C. § 15; Sherman Antitrust Act, 15 U.S.C. § 1
- Overruled by
- State Oil Co. v. Khan (1997)

Albrecht v. Herald Co., 390 U.S. 145 (1968), was a decision by the United States Supreme Court, which reaffirmed the law (as it then was) that fixing a maximum price was illegal per se. This rule was reversed in 1997 by State Oil Co. v. Khan, which held that maximum price-setting was not inherently anti-competitive and not always a violation of antitrust law, and should therefore be evaluated for legality under the rule of reason rather than a per se rule.

Albrecht drew heavy criticism by economists who asserted that maximum price fixing actually increases consumer welfare, which they considered to be a primary goal of antitrust.

== Background ==
Lester J. Albrecht, an independent newspaper carrier, bought from Herald Publishing Company at wholesale and sold at retail copies of Herald's morning newspaper, the St. Louis Globe-Democrat, under an exclusive territory arrangement terminable if a carrier exceeded the maximum retail price advertised by Albrecht. When Albrecht exceeded that price, Herald Co. protested to him and then informed Albrecht's subscribers that it would itself deliver the paper at the lower price. Herald Co. engaged an agency (Milne) to solicit petitioner's customers. About 300 of Albrecht's 1200 subscribers switched to direct delivery by Herald.

Herald Co. later turned these customers over, without cost, to another carrier (Kroner), who was aware of Herald's purpose and knew that he might have to return the route if Albrecht discontinued his pricing practice. Herald Co. told Albrecht that he could have his customers back if he adhered to the suggested price. Albrecht filed a treble-damage complaint which, as later amended, charged a combination in restraint of trade in violation of section 1 of the Sherman Antitrust Act, among Herald, Albrecht's customers, Milne, and Kroner. Albrecht's appointment as carrier was terminated and Herald required sale of his route. Albrecht made the sale at a price found to be lower than it would have been but for the conduct of Herald Co.

The jury found for Herald Co. Albrecht moved for a judgment notwithstanding the verdict, asserting that, under United States v. Parke, Davis & Co., and like cases, the undisputed facts showed a combination to fix resale prices, which was per se illegal under § 1 of the Sherman Act. The district court denied the motion.

=== Ruling of Eighth Circuit ===
The court of appeals affirmed. It held that there could be no violation of § 1 of the Sherman Act, which requires concerted action, because Herald's action was unilateral. Herald was entitled to refuse to deal with Albrecht because he violated his contract requiring him to observe Herald's maximum price. Herald was entitled to engage in competition with Albrecht because he was not entitled to exclusivity after violating the contract.

== Ruling of Supreme Court ==
The Supreme Court reversed in an opinion by Justice White wrote for the Court; Justice Douglas concurred. Justices Harlan and Stewart dissented.

=== Majority opinion ===
The Court decided two principal points, one of which was later overruled. First, the conduct was not unilateral but rather was concerted. Second, later overruled by Khan, maximum price-fixing was illegal per se.

==== The combination ====
Based on the Parke Davis case, there was a combination that Herald put together. In Parke Davis the "combination with retailers arose because their acquiescence in the suggested prices was secured by threats of termination; the combination with wholesalers arose because they cooperated in terminating price-cutting retailers." By the same token, "there can be no doubt that a combination arose between respondent, Milne, and Kroner to force petitioner to conform to the advertised retail price." Herald:

hired Milne to solicit customers away from petitioner in order to get petitioner to reduce his price. It was through the efforts of Milne, as well as because of respondent's letter to petitioner's customers, that about 300 customers were obtained for Kroner. Milne's purpose was undoubtedly to earn its fee, but it was aware that the aim of the solicitation campaign was to force petitioner to lower his price. Kroner knew that respondent was giving him the customer list as part of a program to get petitioner to conform to the advertised price, and he knew that he might have to return the customers if petitioner ultimately complied with respondent's demands. He undertook to deliver papers at the suggested price, and materially aided in the accomplishment of respondent's plan. Given the uncontradicted facts recited by the Court of Appeals, there was a combination within the meaning of § 1 between respondent, Milne, and Kroner, and the Court of Appeals erred in holding to the contrary.

Justice White pointed out other possible combinations that Albrecht might properly have argued existed. First, he could have claimed a combination between Herald and himself, at least "as of the day he unwillingly complied" with Herald's advertised price. Second, "he might successfully have claimed that respondent [Herald] had combined with other carriers because the firmly enforced price policy applied to all carriers, most of whom acquiesced in it." A third possible combination was between Herald and Albrecht's customers.

==== The price fix ====
Price-fixing agreements and combinations are illegal per se, including ones to fix maximum prices. In Kiefer-Stewart Co. v. Seagram & Sons, the Court pointed out, liquor distributors combined to set maximum resale prices. The court of appeals perceived no restraint of trade, but the Supreme Court reversed. It held "that agreements to fix maximum prices 'no less than those to fix minimum prices, cripple the freedom of traders, and thereby restrain their ability to sell in accordance with their own judgment.'" The Court said that it agreed with the Kiefer-Stewart decision:

Maximum and minimum price-fixing may have different consequences in many situations. But schemes to fix maximum prices, by substituting the perhaps erroneous judgment of a seller for the forces of the competitive market, may severely intrude upon the ability of buyers to compete and survive in that market. Competition, even in a single product, is not cast in a single mold. Maximum prices may be fixed too low for the dealer to furnish services essential to the value which goods have for the consumer or to furnish services and conveniences which consumers desire and for which they are willing to pay. Maximum price-fixing may channel distribution through a few large or specifically advantaged dealers who otherwise would be subject to significant non-price competition. Moreover, if the actual price charged under a maximum price scheme is nearly always the fixed maximum price, which is increasingly likely as the maximum price approaches the actual cost of the dealer, the scheme tends to acquire all the attributes of an arrangement fixing minimum prices. It is our view, therefore, that the combination formed by the respondent in this case to force petitioner to maintain a specified price for the resale of the newspapers which he had purchased from respondent constituted, without more, an illegal restraint of trade under § 1 of the Sherman Act.

=== Concurring opinion ===
Justice Douglas agreed that the court of appeals erred, but considered that "this is a 'rule of reason' case."

=== Harlan dissent ===
Justice Harlan considered maximum price-fixing beneficial to the public:

Other things being equal, a manufacturer would like to restrict those distributing his product to the lowest feasible profit margin, for, in this way, he achieves the lowest overall price to the public and the largest volume. When a manufacturer dictates a minimum resale price, he is responding to the interest of his [retailer] customers, who may treat his product better if they have a secure high margin of profits. When the same manufacturer dictates a price ceiling, however, he is acting directly in his own interest, and there is no room for the inference that he is merely a mechanism for accomplishing anticompetitive purposes of his customers.

Justice Harlan also disagreed that one who merely acquiesces engages in concerted action within the meaning of § 1 of the Sherman Act.

=== Stewart dissent ===
Justice Stewart considered that Herald was justified in fixing maximum prices to its ultimate customers, the consuming public, because that was a necessary defensive measure in the face of the territorial monopoly granted the distributors. By not permitting this—" The Court today stands the Sherman Act on its head."

== Judgment ==
The Supreme Court held that Herald Co. acted unlawfully by requiring retailers to sell newspapers at a particular price.

== Economic background ==
A newspaper's profits are determined by its circulation $n$ and the number of advertisements $a$ it sells. Like in every circulation industry, circulation depends upon the price of a copy, as well as the amount of advertising: $n = N(P_{n}, a)$. Similarly, the demand for advertising space is determined by $a = A(P_{a}, n)$. In other words: the higher the circulation, the higher the demand for advertising space. The profit-maxizing newspaper monopolist therefore sets his copy price as:

$P_{n} = \frac{C_{n} - \frac{\partial A}{\partial n}(P_{a} - \frac{\partial C}{\partial a})}{1 - \frac{\delta}{\epsilon_{n}}}$

where $C_{n}$ is the cost per copy, $\frac{\partial C}{\partial a}$ is the marginal cost of advertisement, $\epsilon_{n} = -\frac{\partial N}{\partial P_{n}}\frac{P_{n}}{n}$ is the traditional price elasticity of demand, and $\delta = 1 - \frac{\partial N}{\partial a} \frac{\partial A}{\partial n}$ captures the feedback effect of lower copy prices inducing more advertising and vice versa. Most important is the term $-\frac{\partial A}{\partial n}(P_{a} - \frac{\partial C}{\partial a})$, which captures the marginal advertising profit from selling additional advertising due to increased circulation. The newspaper monopolist's optimal price is therefore lower than for traditional monopolists in non-circulation industries.

== See also ==
- Kiefer-Stewart Co. v. Seagram & Sons, Inc. (1951)
