= Dr. Miles Medical Co. v. John D. Park & Sons Co. =

1911 US Supreme Court case

- Supreme Court of the United States

Argued January 4–5, 1911 Decided April 3, 1911
- Full case name: Dr. Miles Medical Co. v. John D. Park & Sons Co.
- Docket no.: 72
- Citations: 220 U.S. 373 (more)

Holding
- Vertical price restraints are illegal per se.

Court membership
- Chief Justice Edward D. White Associate Justices John M. Harlan · Joseph McKenna; Oliver W. Holmes Jr. · William R. Day; Horace H. Lurton · Charles E. Hughes; Willis Van Devanter · Joseph R. Lamar

Case opinions
- Majority: Hughes, joined by White, Harlan, McKenna, Day, Van Devanter, Lamar
- Dissent: Holmes
- Lurton took no part in the consideration or decision of the case.

Laws applied
- Sherman Antitrust Act
- Overruled by
- Leegin Creative Leather Products, Inc. v. PSKS, Inc.

Dr. Miles Medical Co. v. John D. Park & Sons Co., (220 U.S. 373) (1911), was a United States Supreme Court case on anti-trust grounds that ruled that resale price maintenance, a form of vertical restraint, is illegal per se.

The Dr. Miles Medical Co. (Dr. Miles), now Miles Laboratories, was founded in 1884. In an era when most products were snake oil, Dr. Miles invented a patent medicine that had an actually useful, if somewhat toxic, active ingredient: bromides.

John D. Park & Sons Co. (Park & Sons) was a discount drug reseller that sought to profit off the advertising of Dr. Miles' remedies while selling Dr. Miles products at rock bottom prices. While lower prices drove sales for Park & Sons, it cut into the profits of Dr. Miles. To fix this, Dr. Miles made an agreement with all sellers of its products that they would be required to sell the products at a minimum price.
