= Group boycott =

Type of secondary boycott (anti-competitive)

In competition law, a group boycott is a type of secondary boycott in which two or more competitors in a relevant market refuse to conduct business with a firm unless the firm agrees to cease doing business with an actual or potential competitor of the firms conducting the boycott. It is a form of refusal to deal, and can be a method of shutting a competitor out of a market, or preventing entry of a new firm into a market.

In the United States, such conduct can be held to violate the Sherman Antitrust Act. Depending upon the nature of the boycott, the courts may apply the rule of reason, a quick look analysis, or hold that the boycott is illegal per se. There is a presumption in favor of a rule of reason standard. It may also be considered a form of civil conspiracy.

== See also ==
- Freedom of association – Right to collective action
- Primary boycott – Voluntary abstention from using a product or service
- Refusal to deal – Potentially unlawful anti-competitive practice
- Secondary boycott – Action in support of another disputant
