= Brighton Collectibles =

American accessories manufacturer and retailer

- Brighton store located in Manchester, Connecticut.
- Type: Private
- Industry: Retail
- Founded: 1991
- Founder: Terri Kravitz; Jerry Kohl
- Headquarters: City of Industry, California, United States
- Products: Jewelry, handbags, luggage, small leather goods, belts, shoes, fragrances, gifts, home products and more
- Website: www.brighton.com

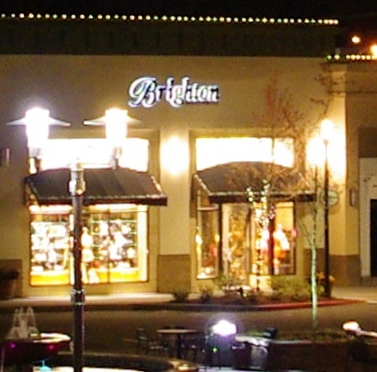
Store in Hillsboro, Oregon

Brighton Collectibles (Brighton) is an American accessories manufacturer and retailer. Its headquarters are located in the City of Industry, California. Brighton Collectibles operates 180 retail stores worldwide and has an online shop.

== History ==
The concept for Brighton began when founders Terri Kravitz and Jerry Kohl opened their first specialty retail store. In 1991, Kravitz and Kohl launched Brighton Collectibles with a single collection of belts. Over time, Brighton has expanded their range of products to include accessories, footwear, luggage, and home accessories in its home line.

In 2007, the company won a case before the U.S. Supreme Court to allow price floors in Leegin Creative Leather Products, Inc. v. PSKS, Inc., which addressed the legality of minimum resale price maintenance.

== Manufacturing and headquarters ==
Brighton Collectibles is a division of Leegin Creative Leather Products, both are based in California. Leegin has been manufacturing belts and other leather accessories for over thirty years with the help of around 600 employees. Components for some of the products are manufactured in countries such as France, Italy, Spain, Korea, and Japan. Brighton footwear is produced in Brazil, Italy, and India, while Brighton handbags are being manufactured in China. Brighton Collectible factories in China are primarily located in Dongguan and Guangzhou, cities known for manufacturing handbags and leather goods. As of February 2020, the company reported that most Brighton jewelry is made in Taiwan.
