= Resale price maintenance =

Anti-competitive practice

Resale price maintenance (RPM) or, occasionally, retail price maintenance is the practice whereby a manufacturer and its distributors agree that the distributors will sell the manufacturer's product at certain prices (resale price maintenance), at or above a price floor (minimum resale price maintenance) or at or below a price ceiling (maximum resale price maintenance). If a reseller refuses to maintain prices, either openly or covertly (see grey market), the manufacturer may stop doing business with it. Resale price maintenance is illegal in many jurisdictions.

Resale price maintenance prevents resellers from competing too fiercely on price, especially with regard to fungible goods. Otherwise, resellers worry it could drive down profits for themselves as well as for the manufacturer. Some argue that the manufacturer may do this because it wishes to keep resellers profitable, thus keeping the manufacturer profitable. Others contend that minimum resale price maintenance, for instance, overcomes a failure in the market for distributional services by ensuring that distributors who invest in promoting the manufacturer's product are able to recoup the additional costs of such promotion in the price that they charge consumers.

Some manufacturers also defend resale price maintenance by saying it ensures fair returns, both for manufacturer and reseller and that governments do not have the right to interfere with freedom to make contracts without a very good reason.

== United Kingdom ==
In Dunlop Pneumatic Tyre Co Ltd v Selfridge & Co Ltd [1915] AC 847, an English contract law case, tyre manufacturer Dunlop had signed an agreement with a dealer to get paid £5 per tyre in liquidated damages if the product was sold below the list price (other than to motor traders). The House of Lords held that Dunlop could not enforce the agreement. However, this had nothing to do with the legality of resale price maintenance clauses, which was not in any question at the time. The decision was based on the doctrine of privity of contract, as retailer Selfridge had bought Dunlop's goods from an intermediary and had no contractual relationship with Dunlop. In the case of Dunlop Pneumatic Tyre Co Ltd v New Garage & Motor Co Ltd [1915] AC 79, the House of Lords upheld the enforceability of the requirement in the resale price maintenance clause, to pay £5 damages per item sold below list price, on the basis that it was not a penalty clause (which would be unenforceable) but a valid and enforceable liquidated damages clause.

In 1955, the Monopolies and Mergers Commission's report Collective Discrimination: A Report on Exclusive Dealing, Aggregated Rebates and Other Discriminatory Trade Practices recommended that resale price maintenance, when collectively enforced by manufacturers, should be made illegal, but individual manufacturers should be allowed to continue the practice. The report was the basis for the Restrictive Trade Practices Act 1956, specifically prohibiting collective enforcement of resale price maintenance in the UK. Restrictive agreements had to be registered at the Restrictive Practices Court and were considered on individual merit.

The Resale Prices Act 1964 considered all resale price agreements to be against public interest unless proven otherwise. In 2010, the Office of Fair Trading (OFT) opened a formal investigation into allegations by an Online Travel Agent (OTA), Skoosh, of resale price maintenance in the hotel industry. The investigation focussed on agreements between OTAs and hotels which may have resulted in fixed or minimum resale prices. In September 2015, the OFT's successor, the Competition and Markets Authority (CMA), closed its investigation into suspected breaches of competition law in the hotel online booking sector.

== European Union ==
In relation to competition, Article 101 and Article 102 of the Treaty on Functioning of the EU (TFEU) are paramount over all member states' national laws relating to competition. Both the Court of Justice of the European Union and the European Commission have held that resale price maintenance is generally prohibited.

== United States ==
In Dr. Miles Medical Co. v. John D. Park & Sons Co., 220 U.S. 373 (1911), the United States Supreme Court affirmed a lower court's holding that a massive minimum resale price maintenance scheme was unreasonable and thus offended Section 1 of the Sherman Antitrust Act. The decision rested on the assertion that minimum resale price maintenance is indistinguishable in economic effect from naked horizontal price fixing by a cartel. Subsequent decisions characterized Dr Miles as holding that minimum resale price maintenance is unlawful per se (automatically).

On June 28, 2007, in the landmark decision of Leegin Creative Leather Products, Inc. v. PSKS, Inc., 551 U.S. 877 (2007), the Supreme Court overruled Dr. Miles and held instead that such vertical price restraints as Minimum Advertised Pricing are not per se unlawful but, rather, must be judged under the "rule of reason". This marked a dramatic shift on how attorneys and enforcement agencies address the legality of contractual minimum prices and essentially allowed the reestablishment of resale price maintenance in the United States in most (but not all) commercial situations.

During the Great Depression in the 1930s, a large number of U.S. states began passing fair trade laws that authorized resale price maintenance. These laws were intended to protect independent retailers from the price-cutting competition of large chain stores. Since these laws allowed vertical price fixing, they directly conflicted with the Sherman Antitrust Act, and Congress had to carve out a special exception for them with the Miller–Tydings Act of 1937. This special exception was expanded in 1952 by the McGuire–Keogh Act (which overrode a 1951 Supreme Court decision that gave a narrower reading of the Miller–Tydings Act).

In 1968, the Supreme Court extended the per se rule against minimum resale price maintenance to maximum resale price maintenance, in Albrecht v. Herald Co., 390 U.S. 145 (1968). The Court opined that such contracts always limited the freedom of dealers to price as they wished. The Court also opined that the practice "may" channel distribution through a few large, efficient dealers, prevent dealers from offering essential services, and that the "maximum" price could instead become a minimum price.

Meanwhile, the fair trade laws became widely unpopular among American consumers and consumer advocates during the 1973–1975 recession. They were seen as allowing retailers and manufacturers to maintain artificially high prices at a time when economic relief was desperately needed. As a result, the Miller–Tydings Act and the McGuire–Keogh Act were repealed by the Consumer Goods Pricing Act of 1975.

In 1997, the Supreme Court overruled Albrecht, in State Oil v. Khan, 522 U.S. 3 (1997).

Several decades after the landmark Dr. Miles decision, scholars began to question the assumption that minimum resale price maintenance, a vertical restraint, was the economic equivalent of a naked horizontal cartel. In 1960, Lester G. Telser, an economist at the University of Chicago, argued that manufacturers could employ minimum resale price maintenance as a tool to ensure that dealers engaged in the desired promotion of a manufacturer's product through local advertising, product demonstrations, and the like. Without such contractual restraints, Telser said, no frills distributors might "free ride" on the promotional efforts of full service distributors, thereby undermining the incentives of full service dealers to expend resources on promotion.

Six years later, Robert Bork reiterated and expanded upon Telser's argument, contending that resale price maintenance was simply one form of contractual integration, analogous to complete vertical integration, that could overcome a failure in the market for distributional services. Bork also argued that non-price vertical restraints, such as exclusive territories, could achieve the same results.

In 1978, the U.S. Supreme Court held that non-price vertical restraints, such as vertically imposed exclusive territories, were to be analyzed under a fact-based "rule of reason". In so doing, the Court embraced the logic of Bork and Telser as applied to such restraints, opining that, in a "purely competitive situation", dealers might free ride on each other's promotional efforts.

In 1980, the U.S. Supreme Court held that the repeal of Miller–Tydings implied that the Sherman Act's complete ban of vertical price fixing was again effective, and that even the 21st Amendment could not shield California's liquor resale price maintenance regime from the reach of the Sherman Act. Thus, from the 1975 enactment of the Consumer Goods Pricing Act to the 2007 Leegin decision, resale price maintenance was again no longer legal in the United States.

== Australia ==
Resale price maintenance is prohibited federally by the Competition and Consumer Act 2010. The law is enforced by the Australian Competition & Consumer Commission. Substantial fines have been issued for violations of this law.

One legal practice that is used by some Australian distributors to maintain a fixed retail price is a "chartered agency" structure. In that structure, rather than a retailer reselling goods purchased from the distributor for profit, the retailer never takes possession of the goods, but receives a commission per sale. Contractually, the goods are sold directly from the distributor to the consumer although the consumer typically visits a retail showroom where the goods are displayed, often next to similar goods from other manufacturers which are sold using the resale model.

The agency structure was popularised in Australia by the high-end white goods manufacturer Miele. It was also adopted by the carmaker Honda in 2021.

== See also ==
- Competition policy
- Competition regulator
- Fixed book price - a form of resale price maintenance used in some parts of the world, either imposed by law or settled by agreement.
- Price fixing
- Manufacturer's suggested retail price
