= National Tea =

Grocery chain that operated in the Midwestern United States

The National Tea Company (NATCO, informally known as National) was a Midwestern United States grocery chain that operated during the 20th century.

== Founding ==
Founded in 1899 by Danish immigrant George S. Rasmussen along with his brother Thorvald in Chicago, Illinois, the retailer spread to about 160 stores by 1920, and annual sales approached $13 million. By the end of the '20s, National Tea had over 600 locations in the Chicago area alone and another 1,000 stores nationwide. Sales grew to about $90 million a year. Many of these stores were closed or sold during the Great Depression, but National Tea remained among the 10 largest grocery chains in the United States for most of the 20th century.

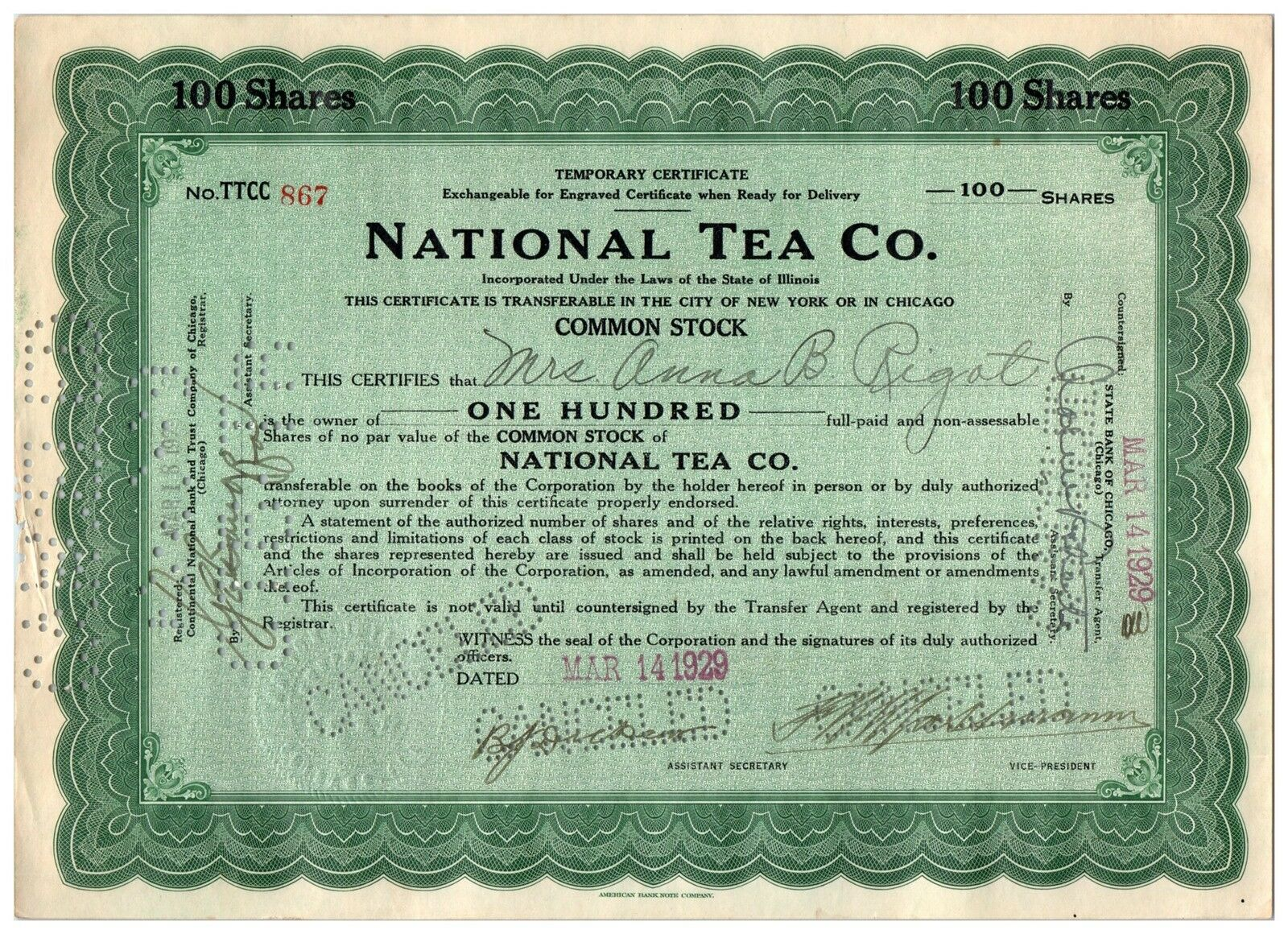
A 100-share National Tea Co. stock certificate from 1929.

== Sale to George Weston and Expansion ==
In 1955, when annual sales topped $600 million (~$5.33 billion in 2023) and the company had nearly 20,000 employees nationwide, National Tea was purchased by George Weston Ltd., a large Canadian grocery retailer, later renamed Loblaw Companies. Most National stores were in the Mississippi Valley, including in Louisiana. During the 1950s, it acquired about 500 new stores by buying up smaller chains.

Eventually, National, renamed National Supermarkets, was pared down to operations in Missouri, Illinois, Indiana, Minnesota and Louisiana. It was a major chain in the St. Louis, Indianapolis and New Orleans areas. Later Loblaw sold off some of its stores (63) to The Great Atlantic & Pacific Tea Company, better known as A&P, in 1976.

== Sale to Schnucks and Decline ==
Schnucks Markets acquired National Tea in 1995 from Loblaw Companies. Immediately following this purchase, Schnucks received approval from the Federal Trade Commission to sell the National Tea New Orleans division to Schwegmann Giant Super Markets of Metairie, Louisiana, which later sold them to A&P, which finally sold them to Rouse Markets in 2007. National itself had cemented the number two spot in St. Louis by acquiring several former Kroger locations and the Kroger distribution center in the market when the latter exited St. Louis in 1986. Kroger and National had been battling for the number two and three spots in the St. Louis market since the 1970s, swapping rankings several times over throughout the 1970s and 1980s. Schnucks, to avoid having too much market share in St Louis, was required to sell off some of the National Store locations, which it did to James Gibson who later was indicted for fraud involving structured settlements.

National Supermarkets no longer has a separate existence as a retail chain.
