= John G. Schwegmann =

American businessman and politician

John Gerald Schwegmann (August 12, 1911 – March 6, 1995) was an American businessman, a member of the Louisiana House of Representatives, and a member of the Louisiana Public Service Commission. In 1971, he unsuccessfully ran for Governor of Louisiana. Additionally, he founded Schwegmann Bank & Trust Co. As a businessman and a chief executive officer of Schwegmann Brothers Giant Supermarkets, he at times challenged the fair trade laws.
