= State Oil Co. v. Khan =

- Supreme Court of the United States

Argued October 7, 1997 Decided November 4, 1997
- Full case name: State Oil Company v. Barkat U. Khan
- Citations: 522 U.S. 3 (more) 118 S. Ct. 275; 139 L. Ed. 2d 199; 1997 U.S. LEXIS 6705

Case history
- Prior: Summary judgment granted in favor of defendant, Khan v. State Oil Co., 907 F. Supp. 1202 (N.D. Ill. 1995); affirmed in part, reversed in part, 93 F.3d 1358 (7th Cir. 1996); cert. granted, 519 U.S. 1107 (1997).

Holding
- Vertical maximum price fixing should be evaluated under the rule of reason, which can effectively identify those situations in which it amounts to anticompetitive conduct.

Court membership
- Chief Justice William Rehnquist Associate Justices John P. Stevens · Sandra Day O'Connor; Antonin Scalia · Anthony Kennedy; David Souter · Clarence Thomas; Ruth Bader Ginsburg · Stephen Breyer

Case opinion
- Majority: O'Connor, joined by unanimous

Laws applied
- Sherman Antitrust Act, 15 U.S.C. § 1 Clayton Antitrust Act, 15 U.S.C. § 15
- This case overturned a previous ruling or rulings
- Albrecht v. Herald Co. (1968)

State Oil Co. v. Khan, 522 U.S. 3 (1997), was a decision by the United States Supreme Court, which held that vertical maximum price fixing was not inherently unlawful, thereby overruling a previous Supreme Court decision, Albrecht v. Herald Co., 390 U.S. 145 (1968). However, the Court concluded that "[i]n overruling Albrecht, the Court does not hold that all vertical maximum price fixing is per se lawful, but simply that it should be evaluated under the rule of reason, which can effectively identify those situations in which it amounts to anticompetitive conduct."

== Background ==
The 1968 decision in Albrecht v. Herald Co. held that wholesalers could not require franchisees and retailers of their products to sell items at a certain price. Advertisements regarding sales, therefore, always included the language "available at participating retailers only."

The case before the court in 1997 involved a gasoline wholesaler and Chicago service station. State Oil Co. attempted to force the gasoline station owner, Barkat Khan, to sell State Oil's product at certain prices. Khan resisted and filed suit, claiming a violation of anti-trust law.

Khan won his case in the United States Court of Appeals in Chicago, presided over by Judge Richard Posner. Posner, however, mocked the Supreme Court's 1968 ruling on the matter in his decision, calling it "unsound when decided," "moth-eaten," and "increasingly wobbly" in application. Posner nevertheless abided by the Supreme Court's earlier decision, saying that it was the law until the Court overruled it.

== Decision ==
Justice Sandra Day O'Connor wrote the unanimous opinion for the Court, overturning the previous case. She noted Posner was correct to rule for stare decisis, writing "it is this Court’s prerogative alone to overrule one of its precedents." However, she wrote that she agreed with Posner: "Chief Judge Posner aptly described Albrecht's infirmities." Although she noted that the Court was cautious in overturning precedents, the "great weight" of scholarly opinion had held that the Court's 1968 decision was incorrect.

== See also ==
- List of United States Supreme Court cases, volume 522
- List of United States Supreme Court cases
- Lists of United States Supreme Court cases by volume
- Leegin Creative Leather Products, Inc. v. PSKS, Inc. (2007)
