= Leegin Creative Leather Products, Inc. v. PSKS, Inc. =

- Supreme Court of the United States

Argued March 26, 2007 Decided June 28, 2007
- Full case name: Leegin Creative Leather Products, Inc. v. PSKS, Inc.
- Docket no.: 06-480
- Citations: 551 U.S. 877 (more) 127 S. Ct. 2705; 168 L. Ed. 2d 623

Case history
- Prior: Certiorari to the United States Court of Appeals for the Fifth Circuit

Holding
- Vertical price restraints are to be judged by the rule of reason rather than treated as illegal per se.

Court membership
- Chief Justice John Roberts Associate Justices John P. Stevens · Antonin Scalia; Anthony Kennedy · David Souter; Clarence Thomas · Ruth Bader Ginsburg; Stephen Breyer · Samuel Alito

Case opinions
- Majority: Kennedy, joined by Roberts, Scalia, Thomas, Alito
- Dissent: Breyer, joined by Stevens, Souter, Ginsburg

Laws applied
- Sherman Antitrust Act
- This case overturned a previous ruling or rulings
- Dr. Miles Medical Co. v. John D. Park & Sons Co. (1911)

Leegin Creative Leather Products, Inc. v. PSKS, Inc., 551 U.S. 877 (2007), is a US antitrust case in which the United States Supreme Court overruled Dr. Miles Medical Co. v. John D. Park & Sons Co. Dr Miles had ruled that vertical price restraints were illegal per se under Section 1 of the Sherman Antitrust Act. Leegin established that the legality of such restraints are to be judged based on the rule of reason.

== Facts ==
Leegin, a manufacturer of leather apparel, concluded that its interests would be best served by opting out of a price war "race to the bottom," focusing instead on quality and brand cachet. Accordingly, with specific exceptions, it decided to refuse sale to retailers if they intended to discount its products below their recommended retail price. Five years after this policy was introduced, Leegin discovered that Kay's Kloset was violating the policy by marking down the Leegin products by 20%. When Kay's refused to comply with Leegin's policy, Leegin cut them off. PSKS, the parent company of Kay's, sued charging that Leegin had violated antitrust laws when it entered into "agreements with retailers to charge only those prices fixed by Leegin." After the district court refused to hear testimony describing the procompetitive effects of Leegin's pricing policy, Leegin appealed seeking to have Dr. Miles overruled.

== Judgment ==
Dr. Miles became an outlier almost as soon as it was decided; the court started moving away from per se rules in antitrust, both generally and in the particular area of vertical restraints. After a brief mid-century period in which the court imposed a more social goals-oriented jurisprudence, the court tacked to an understanding of antitrust based on allocative efficiency, primarily under the influence of Robert Bork's book The Antitrust Paradox. This trend continued in cases like Continental Television, Inc. v. GTE Sylvania, Inc. (1977), State Oil Co. v. Khan (1997), and Verizon Communications Inc. v. Law Offices of Curtis V. Trinko, LLP (2004).

In Leegin, the court formally overruled Dr. Miles. Citing Bork, Ronald Coase, and others, the Court stated that manufacturer-imposed minimum resale prices can lead retailers to compete efficiently for customer sales in ways other than cutting the retail price.

== See also ==
- List of United States Supreme Court cases, volume 551
- List of United States Supreme Court cases
- United States v. Apple Inc. (S.D.N.Y., 2013)
