= Fair trade law =

Fair trade

A fair trade law was a statute in any of various states of the United States that permitted manufacturers the right to specify the minimum retail price of a commodity, a practice known as "price maintenance". Such laws first appeared in 1931 during the Great Depression in the state of California. They were ostensibly intended to protect small businesses to some degree from competition from very large chain stores during a time when small businesses were suffering. Many people objected to this on the grounds that if the manufacturers could set the price, consumers would have to pay more even at large discount stores. The complexity of the market also made the enforcement of these laws almost impractical. As the chain stores became more popular, and bargain prices more common, there was a widespread repeal of the laws in many jurisdictions. By 1975, the laws had been repealed completely.

== See also ==
- Resale price maintenance
