= Illegal per se =

Term for an inherently illegal act

In US law, the term illegal per se means that the act is inherently illegal. Thus, an act is illegal without extrinsic proof of any surrounding circumstances such as lack of scienter (knowledge) or other defenses. Acts are made illegal per se by statute, constitution or case law.

== Drunk driving ==
Many drunk driving laws make driving with a blood alcohol content over a certain limit (such as 0.05% or 0.08%) an act which is illegal per se.

== Antitrust ==
In the United States, illegal per se often refers to categories of anti-competitive behavior in antitrust law conclusively presumed to be an "unreasonable restraint on trade" and thus anti-competitive. The United States Supreme Court has, in the past, determined activities such as price fixing, geographic market division, and group boycott to be illegal per se regardless of the reasonableness of such actions. Traditionally, illegal per se anti-trust acts describe horizontal market arrangements among competitors.

The illegal per se category can trace its origins in the 1898 Supreme Court case Addyston Pipe & Steel Co. v. U.S., 175 U.S. 211 (1898).

A number of cases have subsequently raised doubts about the validity of the illegal per se rule. Under modern Antitrust theories, the traditionally illegal per se categories create more of a presumption of unreasonableness. The court carefully narrowed the per se treatment and began issuing guidelines. Courts and agencies seeking to apply the per se rule must:

1. show "the practice facially appears to be one that would always or almost always tend to restrict competition and decrease output";
2. show that the practice is not "one designed to 'increase economic efficiency and render markets more, rather than less, competitive'";
3. carefully examine market conditions; and
4. absent good evidence of competitiveness behavior, avoid broadening per se treatment to new or innovative business relationships.

== See also ==
- Malum in se
- Negligence per se
- Presumption
- Rule of reason
- Strict liability (criminal)
