= United States v. Terminal Railroad Association =

- Supreme Court of the United States

Argued October 20–23, 1911 Decided April 22, 1912
- Full case name: United States v. Terminal Railroad Association of St. Louis
- Citations: 224 U.S. 383 (more) 32 S. Ct. 507; 56 L. Ed. 810

Holding
- It is a violation of the antitrust laws to refuse to allow a competitor access to a facility necessary for entering or remaining in the market.

Court membership
- Chief Justice Edward D. White Associate Justices Joseph McKenna · Oliver W. Holmes Jr. William R. Day · Horace H. Lurton; Charles E. Hughes · Willis Van Devanter; Joseph R. Lamar · Mahlon Pitney

Case opinion
- Majority: Lurton, joined by unanimous
- Holmes took no part in the consideration or decision of the case.

Laws applied
- Sherman Antitrust Act, 15 U.S.C. §§ 1–2

United States v. Terminal Railroad Association, 224 U.S. 383 (1912), is the first case in which the United States Supreme Court held it a violation of the antitrust laws to refuse to a competitor access to a facility necessary for entering or remaining in the market (an "essential facility"). In this case a combination of firms was carrying out the restrictive practice, rather than a single firm, which made the conduct susceptible to challenge under section 1 of the Sherman Act (15 U.S.C. § 1) rather than under the heightened standard of section 2 of that act (15 U.S.C. § 2). Even so, the case was brought under both sections.

== Background ==
Twenty-four lines of railway converge at St. Louis. About half of them terminate on the Illinois side of the Mississippi River. The other half terminate in or near St. Louis, on the west bank. The cost of construction and maintenance of railroad bridges over the Mississippi River is so great that it is impracticable for every railroad desiring to enter or pass through the city to have its own bridge.

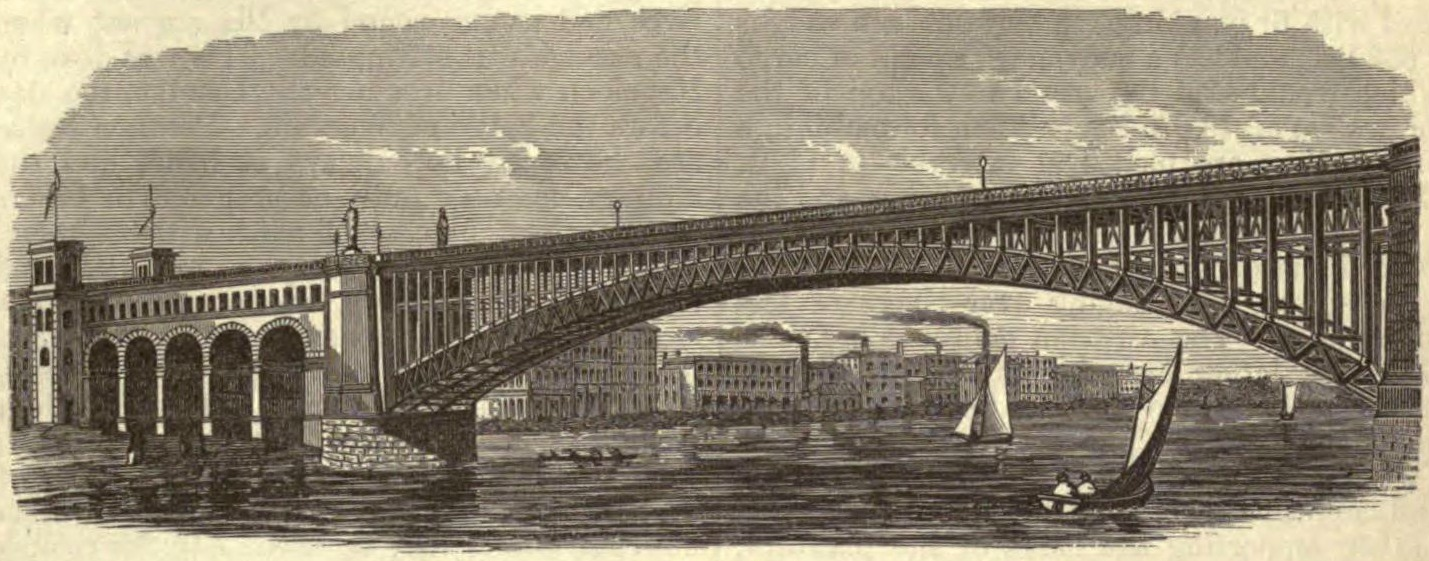
Bridge across Mississippi River controlled by Terminal Railroad Association

The Terminal Railroad Association (TRA) of St. Louis, the principal one of the 38 defendants in this case, was organized in 1889 by Jay Gould and a number of the defendant railroad companies to acquire several independent terminal companies at St. Louis, Missouri, in order to combine and operate them as a unified system. The TRA acquired the St. Louis Union Station, the only existing railroad bridge across the Mississippi River at St. Louis, "and every connecting or terminal company by means of which that bridge could be used by railroads terminating on either side of the river."

For a time, two other companies existed that provided means of crossing the Mississippi River from the Illinois side of the river to St. Louis: the Wiggins Ferry Company, which operated a ferry; and, after 1890, the Merchants Bridge Company built a second railroad bridge. But after 1892 the TRA acquired control of the other two companies.

The fourteen railroads owning the TRA control about one third of the railroad mileage of the United States. They agreed that no additional railroad could become a member of the TRA except by unanimous consent of the existing member railroads.

The United States filed an antitrust suit in the circuit court for the Eastern District of Missouri under sections 1 and 2 of the Sherman Act (15 U.S.C. §§ 1–2). The four-member panel divided equally and the case was therefore dismissed without opinion. The United States appealed.

== Ruling of Supreme Court ==
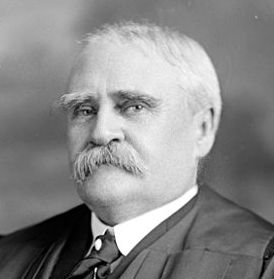
Justice Lurton delivered the opinion of the Court

Justice Horace Lurton delivered the opinion of the Court, reversing the judgment of dismissal by the circuit court.

Justice Lurton began his legal analysis by stating that "the question upon which the case must turn [is]: has the unification of substantially every terminal facility by which the traffic of St. Louis is served resulted in a combination which is in restraint of trade within the meaning and purpose of the Anti-Trust Act?" The Court explained:

It is not contended that the unification of the terminal facilities of a great city where many railroad systems center is, under all circumstances and conditions, a combination in restraint of trade or commerce. Whether it is a [reasonable] facility in aid of interstate commerce or an unreasonable restraint, forbidden by the Act of Congress, as construed and applied by this Court in the cases of Standard Oil Co. v. United States, 221 U. S. 1 [1911], and United States v. American Tobacco Co., 221 U. S. 106 [1911], will depend upon the intent to be inferred from the extent of the control thereby secured over instrumentalities which such commerce is under compulsion to use, the method by which such control has been brought about, and the manner in which that control has been exerted.

The Court concluded that the fourteen defendant railroads had deliberately brought about a monopoly at the St. Louis bottleneck by purchasing control of all competing alternate means of crossing the river:

The independent existence of these three terminal systems was therefore a menace to complete domination, as keeping open the way for greater competition. Only by their absorption or some equivalent arrangement was it possible to exclude from independent entrance . . . any other company which might desire its own terminals. To close the door to competition, large sums were expended to acquire stock control. . . . It becomes, therefore, of the utmost importance to know the character and purpose of the corporation which has combined all of the terminal instrumentalities upon which the commerce of a great city and gateway between the East and West must depend. The fact that the terminal company is not an independent corporation at all is of the utmost significance.

The Court found several unreasonable provisions in the agreement among the fourteen railroad proprietors of the TRA, which were not necessary to accomplish the legitimate objectives of providing those proprietors with transportation across the Mississippi River but instead unjustifiably restrained trade. First the fourteen railroad proprietors of the TRA had a veto power over new entrants. Further, "the proprietary companies obligate themselves to forever use the facilities of the terminal company for all business destined to cross the river." The effect is to guarantee against any competitive system coming into existence, "since the companies to the agreement now control about one third of the railroad mileage of the United States."

The TRA has engaged in practices that "operate to the disadvantage of the commerce which must cross the river at St. Louis, and of nonproprietary railroad lines compelled to use its facilities." The TRA discriminates in rates to favor East St. Louis firms at the expense of St. Louis firms.

The Court concluded that "when, as here, the inherent conditions are such as to prohibit any other reasonable means of entering the city, the combination of every such facility under the exclusive ownership and control of less than all of the companies under compulsion to use them violates both the first and second sections" of the Sherman Act. Therefore the agreement that the fourteen TRA proprietary railroads maintain are "a contract or combination in restraint of commerce among the states and an attempt to monopolize commerce among the states which must pass through the gateway at St. Louis."

The question then became what remedy was appropriate/ The government "urged a dissolution of the combination between the terminal company, the Merchants' Bridge Terminal Company, and the Wiggins Ferry Company." The Court recognized that the fourteen proprietary companies have obtained power:

of dominating commerce among the states, carried on by other railroads entering or seeking to enter the City of St. Louis, and by which such railroads are compelled either to desist from carrying on interstate commerce or to do so upon the terms imposed by the proprietary companies. This control and possession constitute such a grip upon the commerce of St. Louis and commerce which must cross the river there, whether coming from the east or west, as to be both an illegal restraint and an attempt to monopolize.

But the Court did not want to go as far as the government urged unless it was necessary, and it stated that it would be willing to consider other measures, if effective. It therefore reversed the dismissal and remanded the case to the lower court, so that it could direct the parties to submit "a plan for the reorganization of the contract between the fourteen defendant railroad companies and the terminal company, which we have pointed out as bringing the combination within the inhibition of the statute." The plan decreed must cover seven points:

1. It must provide "for the admission of any existing or future railroad to joint ownership and control of the combined terminal properties, upon such just and reasonable terms as shall place such applying company upon a plane of equality in respect of benefits and burdens with the present proprietary companies."
2. It must also provide for "the use of the terminal facilities by any other railroad not electing to become a joint owner, upon such just and reasonable terms and regulations as will, in respect of use, character, and cost of service, place every such company upon as nearly an equal plane as may be with respect to expenses and charges as that occupied by the proprietary companies."
3. Eliminate from the "agreement between the terminal company and the proprietary companies any provision which restricts any such company to the use of the facilities of the terminal company."
4. Abolish billing that bills to East St. Louis and then adds a discriminatory charge for transit to St. Louis.
5. Abolish and extra "charge for the use of the terminal facilities in respect of traffic" discriminating against traffic originating outside of the local area.

== Subsequent developments ==
Subsequent Supreme Court and lower court opinions have extended the doctrine of this case to other combined and unilateral activity.

=== Associated Press ===
In Associated Press v. United States, the Supreme Court considered the operating methods of the Associated Press (AP), an organization that gathered new stories from its members (newspaper publishers) and distributed the news stories to its members, on a nationwide and international basis. AP's by-laws prohibited supply of AP news to nonmembers, prohibited members from furnishing news to nonmembers, and allowed existing members to veto membership applications of competitors. A contract between AP and a Canadian press association obligated both organizations to furnish news exclusively to each other. The Government sought an injunction against AP and its member publishers under the Sherman Act.

The Supreme Court held that the by-laws and the contract, together with the admitted facts, justified summary judgment; that the First Amendment does not immunize newspaper publishers from the Sherman Act; that the by-laws, on their face, constituted restraints of trade; that the fact that AP had not achieved a complete monopoly was irrelevant; and that the fact that there are other news agencies that sell news, and that AP's reports are not "indispensable," give AP's restrictive by-laws no exemption under the Sherman Act's prohibition of agreements in restraint of trade.

As in the Terminal R.R. case, a combination among actors agreed to impose the restriction. That fact, as well as the Court's statement that AP's news was not indispensable, made the case not a pure essential facilities § 2 case. Instead, it permitted a boycott "per se" legal theory under § 1.

=== Lorain Journal ===
In Lorain Journal Co. v. United States, a newspaper with a dominant position in its local advertising market, adopted a policy of refusing to deal with merchants that also advertised in a radio station attempting to enter the market. The Supreme Court held that "a single newspaper, already enjoying a substantial monopoly in its area, violates the 'attempt to monopolize' clause of § 2 when it uses its monopoly to destroy threatened competition." While the violation found was a unilateral § 2 violation, arguably the case could have been analyzed under § 1 as a combination or contracts with the many merchants that submitted to the Journal's demands that they not deal with the radio station. The case is generally viewed, however, given the Court's reliance on § 2, as a unilateral essential-facilities case.

=== Gamco ===
Gamco, Inc. v. Providence Fruit & Produce Building, Inc. is a 1952 First Circuit decision holding that a company controlling a building, together with its street and railroad approaches, that was built to serve as the centralized market for the wholesaling of fresh produce in Providence, Rhode Island, violated the antitrust laws when it unjustifiably expelled the plaintiff produce dealer Gamco and refused to allow him to rent space in the facility.

=== Hecht ===
Hecht v. Pro-Football, Inc. is said to be the "first authoritative statement of the essential facilities doctrine in haec verba." The court held that the plaintiff was entitled to a jury instruction, which the district court had refused, on the essential facilities doctrine. saying:

Hecht requested an instruction that if the jury found (1) that use of RFK stadium was essential to the operation of a professional football team in Washington; (2) that such stadium facilities could not practicably be duplicated by potential competitors; (3) that another team could use RFK stadium in the Redskins' absence without interfering with the Redskins' use; and (4) that the [exclusivity provision] prevented equitable sharing of the stadium by potential competitors, then the jury must find the [provision] to constitute a contract in unreasonable restraint of trade.

=== Otter Tail ===
In Otter Tail Power Co. v. United States,

=== Image Technical ===
Eastman Kodak Co. v. Image Technical Services, Inc., is a 1992 Supreme Court decision holding that a lack of market power in the primary (photocopier) equipment market does not necessarily preclude antitrust liability for exclusionary conduct in the repair parts secondary (photocopier) market where the defendant seller of patented and unpatented repair parts had market power. Accordingly, an antitrust treble damages action could be based on the defendant's refusal to sell parts to independent service providers. In effect, the repair parts monopoly power that Kodak had was an essential facility.

=== Aspen Skiing ===
In Aspen Skiing Co. v. Aspen Highlands Skiing Corp., the Supreme Court upheld the Lorain Journal decision by ruling that Aspen Skiing violated § 2 of the Sherman Act by refusing to honor vouchers and ski lift tickets after it had previously done so.

=== Trinko ===
In Verizon Communications Inc. v. Law Offices of Curtis V. Trinko, LLP, is a 2004 Supreme Court decision in which the Court stated, "The mere possession of monopoly power, and the concomitant charging of monopoly prices, is not only not unlawful; it is an important element of the free-market system." The Court acknowledged that "under certain [limited] circumstances, a refusal to cooperate with rivals can constitute anticompetitive conduct and violate § 2." It said that Aspen Skiing is the leading case on this point, but "Aspen Skiing is at or near the outer boundary of § 2 liability." The refusal to deal in the Trinko case did not "fit within the limited exception recognized in Aspen Skiing" to the general right to unilaterally refuse to deal with rivals. The pleadings did not allege "anticompetitive malice." The Otter Tail case was also no help to plaintiff because in that case, unlike this case, "the defendant was already in the business of providing a service to certain customers (power transmission over its network), and refused to provide the same service to certain other customers." The Court added that it had never recognized the essential facilities doctrine "and we find no need either to recognize it or to repudiate it here. It suffices for present purposes to note that the indispensable requirement for invoking the doctrine is the unavailability of access to the 'essential facilities'; where access exists, the doctrine serves no purpose."
