= Gamco, Inc. v. Providence Fruit & Produce Building, Inc. =

- Court: United States Court of Appeals for the First Circuit
- Full case name: Gamco, Inc. v. Providence Fruit & Produce Building, Inc., et al.
- Decided: February 13, 1952
- Citation: 194 F.2d 484

Case history
- Subsequent history: Cert. denied, 344 U.S. 817 (1952).

Court membership
- Judges sitting: Charles Edward Clark, Peter Woodbury, Francis Ford

Case opinions
- Majority: Clark, joined by unanimous

Laws applied
- Sherman Antitrust Act

Gamco, Inc. v. Providence Fruit & Produce Building, Inc., 194 F.2d 484 (1st Cir. 1952), is a 1952 First Circuit decision in the United States.

It holds that an organization controlling a building that served as the centralized market for the wholesaling of fresh produce in Providence, Rhode Island, violated the antitrust laws when it unjustifiably expelled the plaintiff produce dealer Gamco and refused to allow it to rent space in the facility.

The court does not mention the term "essential facility." but this is an important essential facility doctrine case.

== Background ==
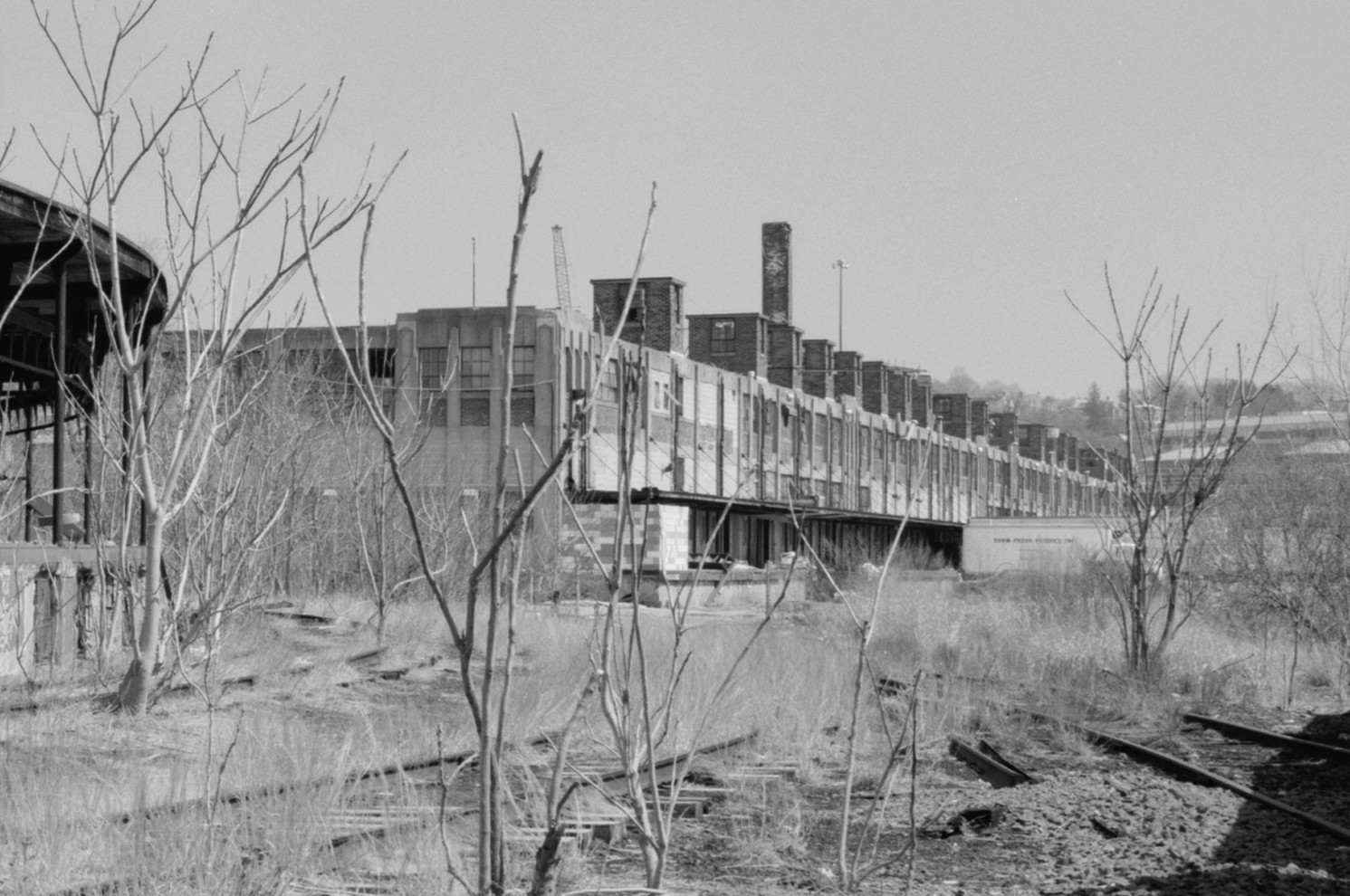
Providence Fruit and Produce Building

The Providence Fruit & Produce Building, Inc. (PF&PB) operated a building along the railroad tracks in Providence, R. I., which served as a produce market where the city's wholesale fruit and vegetable trade was concentrated. It was designed to provide selling, storage, and shipping facilities to the fresh fruit and vegetable dealers of Providence who had found themselves forced from the downtown city streets by accumulating traffic congestion. The facilities are particularly advantageous to local wholesalers. The shipping facilities are the best in Providence.

The wholesaler tenants of the building were stockholders of PF&PB. All the leases contained a clause under which the tenants agreed not to "transfer or permit to be transferred any interest in the business" without PF&PB's permission. Gamco, because of financial difficulties, borrowed money from Sawyer & Co., another wholesale fruit and produce dealer (apparently considered a price cutter) whose business was primarily in Boston, and the Gamco shareholders pledged their stock as security. In effect, Gamco's situation deteriorated sufficiently that Sawyer foreclosed and acquired the Gamco stock and control over Gamco. This transfer of stock occurred without Gamco's first obtaining PF&PB's permission. As a result, PF&PB refused to renew Gamco's lease and PF&PB had Gamco ejected from the building.

Gamco then sued under Sections 1 and 2 of the Sherman Act and the district court found for defendants. The district court considered the Sherman Act "as condoning defendants' monopoly position as long as competition ruled the ultimate selling market subsequent to Gamco's ouster."

== Ruling of First Circuit ==
The First Circuit reversed. It explained:

Where, as here, defendants enjoy a power to deny their competitors access to the market, "evidence that competitive activity has not actually declined is inconclusive." . . . Defendants contend, however, that a discriminatory policy in regard to the lessees in the Produce Building can never amount to monopoly because other alternative selling sites are available. The short answer to this is that a monopolized resource seldom lacks substitutes; alternatives will not excuse monopolization. . . . But it is only at the Building itself that the purchasers to whom a competing wholesaler must sell and the rail facilities which constitute the most economical method of bulk transport are brought together. To impose upon plaintiff the additional expenses of developing another site, attracting buyers, and transhipping his fruit and produce by truck is clearly to extract a monopolist's advantage. The Act does not merely guarantee the right to create markets; it also insures the right of entry to old ones.

The First Circuit accepted that the defendants did not seek to obtain a monopoly position: "Admittedly the finite limitations of the building itself thrust monopoly power upon the defendants, and they are not required to do the impossible in accepting indiscriminately all who would apply." Therefore, reasonable selection criteria, such as lack of available space or financial unsoundness, would not violate the antitrust laws. Nonetheless:

But the latent monopolist must justify the exclusion of a competitor from a market which he controls. Where, as here, a business group understandably susceptible to the temptations of exploiting its natural advantage against competitors prohibits one previously acceptable from hawking his wares beside them any longer at the very moment of his affiliation with a potentially lower priced outsider, they may be called upon for a necessary explanation. The conjunction of power and motive to exclude with an exclusion not immediately and patently justified by reasonable business requirements establishes a prima facie case of the purpose to monopolize . Defendants thus had the duty to come forward and justify Gamco's ouster. This they failed to do save by a suggestion of financial unsoundness obviously hollow in view of the fact that the latter's affiliation with Sawyer & Co. put it in a far more secure credit position than it had enjoyed even during its legal tenancy. We therefore hold that, although selection and discrimination among those who would become lessees was necessary, defendants have failed to show that the basis for their action here was innocent of the economic consideration alleged.

The court added that "it is incumbent on one with the monopolist's power to deny a substantial economic advantage such as this to a competitor to come forward with some business justification. Since none was offered we must hold the exclusion unjustified."

== Subsequent developments ==
The Department of Justice later brought an antitrust suit against the defendants, alleging a conspiracy to restrain and monopolize trade in fruit and vegetable produce, and the case was settled with a consent order.

== Commentary ==
● Charles Barber, in an article in the University of Pennsylvania Law Review commented that the Gamco case represented perhaps "the ultimate position on behalf of a duty to sell under Section 2," because the First Circuit "considered the plaintiff's burden of proof satisfied once the seller's position as a latent monopolist was shown." Barber criticizes the decision for resting the judgment on unilateral attempted monopolization instead of "in terms of a conspiracy among competing wholesalers to monopolize the wholesale fruit and vegetable business of Providence by excluding competition deemed undesirable," as for example in United States v. Terminal Railroad Association.

● A.D. Neale characterized the Gamco case as holding: "The Sherman Act requires that where facilities cannot practically be duplicated by would-be competitors, those in possession of them must allow them to be shared on fair terms. It is illegal restraint of trade to foreclose the scarce facility."

== See also ==
- Essential facilities doctrine
