= List of United States Supreme Court cases, volume 224 =

Supreme Court of the United States
- Interactive map of Supreme Court of the United States
- 38°53′26″N 77°00′16″W
- Established: March 4, 1789; 236 years ago
- Location: Washington, D.C.
- Coordinates: 38°53′26″N 77°00′16″W
- Composition method: Presidential nomination with Senate confirmation
- Authorised by: Constitution of the United States, Art. III, § 1
- Judge term length: life tenure, subject to impeachment and removal
- Number of positions: 9 (by statute)
- Website: supremecourt.gov

This is a list of cases reported in volume 224 of United States Reports, decided by the Supreme Court of the United States in 1912.

== Justices of the Supreme Court at the time of volume 224 U.S. ==
The Supreme Court is established by Article III, Section 1 of the Constitution of the United States, which says: "The judicial Power of the United States, shall be vested in one supreme Court . . .". The size of the Court is not specified; the Constitution leaves it to Congress to set the number of justices. Under the Judiciary Act of 1789 Congress originally fixed the number of justices at six (one chief justice and five associate justices). Since 1789 Congress has varied the size of the Court from six to seven, nine, ten, and back to nine justices (always including one chief justice).

When the cases in volume 224 were decided the Court comprised the following nine members:

Portrait	Justice	Office	Home State	Succeeded	Date confirmed by the Senate (Vote)	Tenure on Supreme Court
	Edward Douglass White	Chief Justice	Louisiana	Melville Fuller	December 12, 1910 (Acclamation)	December 19, 1910 – May 19, 1921 (Died)
	Joseph McKenna	Associate Justice	California	Stephen Johnson Field	January 21, 1898 (Acclamation)	January 26, 1898 – January 5, 1925 (Retired)
	Oliver Wendell Holmes Jr.	Associate Justice	Massachusetts	Horace Gray	December 4, 1902 (Acclamation)	December 8, 1902 – January 12, 1932 (Retired)
	William R. Day	Associate Justice	Ohio	George Shiras Jr.	February 23, 1903 (Acclamation)	March 2, 1903 – November 13, 1922 (Retired)
	Horace Harmon Lurton	Associate Justice	Tennessee	Rufus W. Peckham	December 20, 1909 (Acclamation)	January 3, 1910 – July 12, 1914 (Died)
	Charles Evans Hughes	Associate Justice	New York	David Josiah Brewer	May 2, 1910 (Acclamation)	October 10, 1910 – June 10, 1916 (Resigned)
	Willis Van Devanter	Associate Justice	Wyoming	Edward Douglass White (as Associate Justice)	December 15, 1910 (Acclamation)	January 3, 1911 – June 2, 1937 (Retired)
	Joseph Rucker Lamar	Associate Justice	Georgia	William Henry Moody	December 15, 1910 (Acclamation)	January 3, 1911 – January 2, 1916 (Died)
	Mahlon Pitney	Associate Justice	New Jersey	John Marshall Harlan	March 13, 1912 (50–26)	March 18, 1912 – December 31, 1922 (Resigned)

== Notable Case in 224 U.S. ==
=== United States v. Terminal R.R. Ass'n ===
United States v. Terminal R.R. Ass'n, |224 U.S. 383 (1912), is the first case in which the Supreme Court held it a violation of the antitrust laws to refuse a competitor access to a facility necessary for entering or remaining in the relevant market (an "essential facility").

== Citation style ==
Under the Judiciary Act of 1789 the federal court structure at the time comprised District Courts, which had general trial jurisdiction; Circuit Courts, which had mixed trial and appellate (from the US District Courts) jurisdiction; and the United States Supreme Court, which had appellate jurisdiction over the federal District and Circuit courts—and for certain issues over state courts. The Supreme Court also had limited original jurisdiction (i.e., in which cases could be filed directly with the Supreme Court without first having been heard by a lower federal or state court). There were one or more federal District Courts and/or Circuit Courts in each state, territory, or other geographical region.

The Judiciary Act of 1891 created the United States Courts of Appeals and reassigned the jurisdiction of most routine appeals from the district and circuit courts to these appellate courts. The Act created nine new courts that were originally known as the "United States Circuit Courts of Appeals." The new courts had jurisdiction over most appeals of lower court decisions. The Supreme Court could review either legal issues that a court of appeals certified or decisions of court of appeals by writ of certiorari.

On January 1, 1912, the effective date of the Judicial Code of 1911, the old Circuit Courts were abolished, with their remaining trial court jurisdiction transferred to the U.S. District Courts.

Bluebook citation style is used for case names, citations, and jurisdictions.

- "# Cir." = United States Court of Appeals
  - e.g., "3d Cir." = United States Court of Appeals for the Third Circuit
- "C.C.D." = United States Circuit Court for the District of . . .
  - e.g.,"C.C.D.N.J." = United States Circuit Court for the District of New Jersey
- "D." = United States District Court for the District of . . .
  - e.g.,"D. Mass." = United States District Court for the District of Massachusetts
- "E." = Eastern; "M." = Middle; "N." = Northern; "S." = Southern; "W." = Western
  - e.g.,"C.C.S.D.N.Y." = United States Circuit Court for the Southern District of New York
  - e.g.,"M.D. Ala." = United States District Court for the Middle District of Alabama
- "Ct. Cl." = United States Court of Claims
- The abbreviation of a state's name alone indicates the highest appellate court in that state's judiciary at the time.
  - e.g.,"Pa." = Supreme Court of Pennsylvania
  - e.g.,"Me." = Supreme Judicial Court of Maine

== List of cases in volume 224 U.S. ==
Case Name	Page & year	Opinion of the Court	Concurring opinion(s)	Dissenting opinion(s)	Lower Court	Disposition
Henry v. A.B. Dick Co.	1 (1912)	Lurton	none	White	2d Cir.	certification
Thomas v. Taylor	73 (1912)	McKenna	none	none	N.Y. Sup. Ct.	affirmed
Beutler v. Grand et al. R.R. Co.	85 (1912)	Holmes	none	none	7th Cir.	certification
San Juan et al. Co. v. Requena	89 (1912)	VanDevanter	none	none	D.P.R.	affirmed
Campbell v. United States	99 (1912)	VanDevanter	none	none	8th Cir.	reversed
Schodde v. Twin Falls et al. Co.	107 (1912)	White	none	none	9th Cir.	affirmed
Gonzales v. Buist	126 (1912)	White	none	none	D.P.R.	affirmed
Wood v. United	132 (1912)	White	none	none	Ct. Cl.	affirmed
Plummer v. United States	137 (1912)	White	none	none	Ct. Cl.	reversed
J.W. Calnan Co. v. Doherty	145 (1912)	White	none	none	1st Cir.	dismissed
Consumers' Co. v. Hatch	148 (1912)	White	none	none	Idaho	affirmed
Guarantee et al. Co. v. Title et al. Co.	152 (1912)	McKenna	none	none	3d Cir.	reversed
Western Union T. Co. v. City of Richmond	160 (1912)	Holmes	none	none	C.C.E.D. Va.	affirmed
World's F.M. Co. v. Powers	173 (1912)	Holmes	none	none	Ariz.	affirmed
Swanson v. Sears	180 (1912)	Holmes	none	none	Idaho	affirmed
In re Loving	183 (1912)	Day	none	none	6th Cir.	certification
Brown v. Selfridge	189 (1912)	Day	none	none	D.C. Cir.	affirmed
ICC v. Goodrich T. Co.	194 (1912)	Day	none	none	Comm. Ct.	reversed
Haskell v. Kansas N.G. Co.	217 (1912)	Day	none	none	C.C.E.D. Okla.	affirmed
Johnson v. Washington et al. Co.	224 (1912)	Hughes	none	none	D.C. Cir.	affirmed
Sharpe v. Bonham	241 (1912)	Hughes	none	none	C.C.M.D. Tenn.	reversed
Converse v. Hamilton	243 (1912)	VanDevanter	none	none	Wis.	reversed
Holt v. Crucible S. Co.	262 (1912)	VanDevanter	none	none	6th Cir.	affirmed
Brinkmeier v. Missouri P.R.R. Co.	268 (1912)	VanDevanter	none	none	Kan.	affirmed
Standard Oil Co. v. Missouri	270 (1912)	Lamar	none	none	Mo.	affirmed
Crozier v. Krupp A.G.	290 (1912)	White	none	none	D.C. Cir.	reversed
United States v. Société Anonyme	309 (1912)	McKenna	none	none	Ct. Cl.	affirmed
City of Pomona v. Sunset T. & T. Co.	330 (1912)	Holmes	none	none	9th Cir.	reversed
Title et al. Co. v. Nichols	346 (1912)	Lurton	none	none	Ariz.	affirmed
St. Louis et al. R.R. Co. v. Wynne	354 (1912)	VanDevanter	none	none	Ark.	reversed
Gromer v. Standard D. Co.	362 (1912)	McKenna	none	Day	D.P.R.	reversed
United States v. Terminal R.R. Ass'n	383 (1912)	Lurton	none	none	C.C.E.D. Mo.	reversed
Heckman v. United States	413 (1912)	Hughes	none	none	8th Cir.	affirmed
Mullen v. United States	448 (1912)	Hughes	none	none	8th Cir.	reversed
Goat v. United States	458 (1912)	Hughes	none	none	8th Cir.	affirmed
Deming I. Co. v. United States	471 (1912)	Hughes	none	none	8th Cir.	affirmed
ICC v. United States ex rel. Humboldt S.S. Co.	474 (1912)	McKenna	none	none	D.C. Cir.	affirmed
Washington Home Incur's v. American S. & T. Co.	486 (1912)	Holmes	none	none	D.C. Cir.	dismissed
American S. & T. Co. v. District of Columbia	491 (1912)	Holmes	none	none	D.C. Cir.	dismissed
Herndon C. Co. v. J.N. Norris, Son & Co.	496 (1912)	Day	none	none	C.C.W.D. Ky.	reversed
Gulf et al. R.R. Co. v. Dennis	503 (1912)	VanDevanter	none	none	Milam Cnty. Ct.	reversed
Washington ex rel. Oregon et al. Co. v. Fairchild	510 (1912)	Lamar	none	none	Wash.	reversed
Nielsen v. Steinfeld	534 (1912)	White	none	none	Ariz.	reversed
Missouri P.R.R. Co. v. Castle	541 (1912)	White	none	none	C.C.D. Neb.	affirmed
American R.R. Co. v. Birch	547 (1912)	McKenna	none	none	D.P.R.	reversed
McCaughey v. Lyall	558 (1912)	McKenna	none	none	Cal.	affirmed
Waskey v. Chambers	564 (1912)	Holmes	none	none	9th Cir.	reversed
Leary v. United States	567 (1912)	Holmes	none	none	4th Cir.	reversed
Texas & P.R.R. Co. v. Howell	577 (1912)	Holmes	none	none	5th Cir.	affirmed
B. Altman & Co. v. United States	583 (1912)	Day	none	none	C.C.S.D.N.Y.	affirmed
Philadelphia et al. R.R. Co. v. Schubert	603 (1912)	Hughes	none	none	D.C. Cir.	affirmed
Graham v. West Virginia	616 (1912)	Hughes	none	none	W. Va.	affirmed
Cross Lake et al. Club v. Louisiana	632 (1912)	VanDevanter	none	none	La.	dismissed
Gritts v. Fisher	640 (1912)	VanDevanter	none	none	D.C. Cir.	affirmed
City of Louisville v. Cumberland T. & T. Co.	649 (1912)	Lamar	none	none	C.C.W.D. Ky.	affirmed
Choate v. Trapp	665 (1912)	Lamar	none	none	Okla.	reversed
Gleason v. Wood	679 (1912)	Lamar	none	none	Okla.	reversed
English v. Richardson	680 (1912)	Lamar	none	none	Okla.	reversed
