= Monopolizing =

Monopolizing may refer to:

- Monopolization, a crime under United States antitrust law
- The act of creating, maintaining, or using power derived from a monopoly
- Anti-competitive practices
