= Otter Tail Power Co. v. United States =

- Supreme Court of the United States

Argued December 5, 1972 Decided February 22, 1973
- Full case name: Otter Tail Power Co. v. United States
- Citations: 410 U.S. 366 (more) 93 S. Ct. 1022; 35 L. Ed. 2d 359

Case history
- Prior: United States v. Otter Tail Power Co., 331 F. Supp. 54 (D. Minn. 1971), probable jurisdiction noted, 406 U.S. 944 (1972).
- Subsequent: United States v. Otter Tail Power Co., 360 F. Supp. 451 (D. Minn. 1973); affirmed, 417 U.S. 901 (1974).

Court membership
- Chief Justice Warren E. Burger Associate Justices William O. Douglas · William J. Brennan Jr. Potter Stewart · Byron White; Thurgood Marshall · Harry Blackmun; Lewis F. Powell Jr. · William Rehnquist

Case opinions
- Majority: Douglas, joined by Brennan, White, Marshall
- Concur/dissent: Stewart, joined by Burger, Rehnquist
- Blackmun and Powell took no part in the consideration or decision of the case.

Otter Tail Power Co. v. United States, 410 U.S. 366 (1973), is a United States Supreme Court decision often cited as the first case in which the Court held violative of the antitrust laws a single firm's refusal to deal with other firms that denied them access to a facility essential to engaging in business (a so-called essential facility).

== Background ==
=== Facts ===
Otter Tail Power Company (Otter Tail) is an investor-owned electric power utility with headquarters at Fergus Falls, Minnesota. In addition to energy generated within its own plants, it purchased power from other sources. One of these sources was the United States Bureau of Reclamation's Red Wing Dam power generation facility and other Bureau sites. Power purchased from government sources was transmitted ("wheeled") over high-voltage power transmission lines that Otter Tail owns. Most of the wheeled power was to serve the municipal utilities and electric cooperatives within the company's territory across northwestern Minnesota, eastern North Dakota, and northeastern South Dakota. A portion of this energy was also used to meet the company's retail customer needs.

The case involved two principal types of conduct, both of which resulted from Otter Tail's desire to prevent small towns in which it sold power to customers from establishing municipal power systems of their own instead of the residents continuing to be retail customers of Otter Tail. One type of conduct was bringing allegedly frivolous and vexatious suits to prevent the towns from being able to sell municipal bonds to finance the establishment of their municipal power systems. The more important conduct, leading to the essential facilities legal precedent, was Otter Tail's refusal to wheel and sell power to the proposed new local power systems that would replace Otter Tail as power supplier in their towns.

The United States sued Otter Tail for monopolizing the retail distribution and sale of power to towns in its operating area.

=== District court opinion ===
The district court (Devitt, J.) ruled for the Government. It acknowledged:

It is not contended that defendant acted illegally or improperly in achieving this claimed monopoly position but rather in its actions seeking to preserve this position. Specifically, it is urged that Otter Tail's refusal to sell or wheel power to towns desiring to establish municipal systems, and its actions participating in local municipal power political campaigns, and sponsoring, encouraging, and financially supporting court litigation are all intended to impede and frustrate attempts to establish independent municipal electric systems. Otter Tail does not deny its refusal to sell or wheel power to municipalities which it formerly served at retail but argues that to supply power to these municipalities would aid in its own demise. It admits its participation in local municipal political campaigns and in litigation surrounding attempts to establish municipal systems but contends this is proper and legal conduct. Such actions were taken, defendant argues, to preserve the electric power free enterprise system for the benefit of its customers, shareholders and employees.

The court found that Otter Tail had a monopoly in the sale of electric power at retail in the area in which it operated—more than 75% of the relevant market. Many towns cannot obtain power from the Bureau because Otter Tail owns the only transmission lines and refuses to deal with them. It is not economically feasible or practical for a municipality to construct its own transmission lines.

The court concluded "that Otter Tail has a strategic dominance in the transmission of power in most of its service area. The court found that Otter Tail used its refusal to deal and its dominance to prevent towns such as Elbow Lake, Minnesota, from obtaining power to supply the town's municipal power system.

The court ruled that this and similar conduct toward other towns was monopolization in violation of section 2 of the Sherman Act:

Here the defendant does not dispute that its purpose in refusing to deal with municipalities desiring to establish municipally owned systems is to protect itself in the position it now enjoys in the area. Such is a monopoly position, and the law prohibits conduct such as this when such is intended to preserve the monopoly.

. . . Here Otter Tail refuses to sell power to municipalities which would thereby take retail power business from defendant and refuses to wheel power for others willing to sell to these municipalities. Because of its dominant position Otter Tail is able to deprive towns of the benefits of competition which would result from municipally owned facilities.

Pertinent to an examination of the law is a reference to cases expressive of the "bottleneck theory" of antitrust law. This theory reflects in essence that it is an illegal restraint of trade for a party to foreclose others from the use of a scarce facility.

The court then turned to Otter Tail's litigation, finding "Otter Tail either instituted or sponsored and financially supported court litigation which had the effect of frustrating the sale of revenue bonds to finance the municipal systems." The effect was "halting, or appreciably slowing, efforts for municipal ownership" and "the large financial burden imposed on the towns' limited treasury dampened local enthusiasm for public ownership." The court analogized this to litigation under spurious patents and concluded that it was part of a monopolistic scheme.

The court therefore enjoined Otter Tail's monopolistic conduct. Its judgment prohibited Otter Tail from: refusing to sell electric power at wholesale to existing or proposed municipal electric power systems in the areas serviced by Otter Tail, refusing to wheel electric power over the lines from the electric power suppliers to existing or proposed municipal systems in the area, entering into or enforcing any contract which prohibits use of Otter Tail's lines to wheel electric power to municipal electric power systems, or from entering into or enforcing any contract which limits the customers to whom and areas in which Otter Tail or any other electric power company may sell electric power. The district court also enjoined Otter Tail from instituting, supporting, or engaging in litigation, directly or indirectly, against municipalities and their officials who have voted to establish municipal electric power systems for the purpose of delaying, preventing, or interfering with the establishment of a municipal electric power system.

== Supreme Court ruling ==
The Supreme Court affirmed (4-3) the essential facility part of the case but remanded for additional findings on the litigation part. Justice William O. Douglas delivered the opinion of the Court, in which Justices William J. Brennan, Byron White, and Thurgood Marshall joined. Justice Potter Stewart filed an opinion concurring in part and dissenting in part, in which Chief Justice Warren Burger and Justice William Rehnquist joined.

=== Majority opinion ===
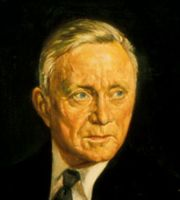
Justice Douglas authored the opinion of the Court

The Court explained that proposed municipal systems face "great obstacles." They must purchase the electric power at wholesale. To do so, they must have access to existing transmission lines. The only ones available belong to Otter Tail. While the Bureau of Reclamation has high-voltage bulk-power supply lines in the area, it does not operate a network for local power delivery, but relies on wheeling contracts with Otter Tail and other utilities to deliver power to its wholesale customers.

When Otter Tail's franchise in several towns expired, the citizens voted to establish their own municipal distribution systems. Otter Tail refused to sell the new systems energy at wholesale and refused to agree to wheel power from other suppliers of wholesale energy to these towns.

The Court said: "The record makes abundantly clear that Otter Tail used its monopoly power in the towns in its service area to foreclose competition or gain a competitive advantage, or to destroy a competitor, all in violation of the antitrust laws." Otter Tail used its "dominance to foreclose potential entrants into the retail area from obtaining electric power from outside sources of supply."

Otter Tail argued that, "without the weapons which it used, more and more municipalities will turn to public power and Otter Tail will go downhill." The Court responded that Otter Tail should "protect itself against loss by operating with superior service, lower costs, and improved efficiency."

While the Court affirmed the part of the judgment enjoining the monopolistic practices relating to denial of access to electric power, it did not affirm the injunction against litigation. After the district court's judgment was entered, the Supreme Court decided California Motor Transport Co. v. Trucking Unlimited, in which it held that "the right to petition extends to all departments of the Government [and] [t]he right of access to the courts is indeed but one aspect of the right of petition" that the First Amendment protects. The Court also held in that case, however, that "where the purpose to suppress competition is evidenced by repetitive lawsuits carrying the hallmark of insubstantial claims," the conduct "is within the 'mere sham' exception" to that protection and is thus subject to antitrust prohibitions. The Court therefore vacated this part of the judgment "and remand[ed] for consideration in light of our intervening decision in California Motor Transport Co."

=== Dissent/concurrence ===
The dissent agreed with the part of the Court's opinion that vacated and remanded for consideration of Otter Tail's litigation activities in light of the Court's decision in California Motor Transport Co, but disagreed with the remainder dealing with monopolistic denial of access to electric power.

In the dissenting justices' view, "As a retailer of power, Otter Tail asserted a legitimate business interest in keeping its lines free for its own power sales and in refusing to lend a hand in its own demise by wheeling cheaper power from the Bureau of Reclamation to municipal consumers which might otherwise purchase power at retail from Otter Tail itself." Furthermore, "Otter Tail's refusal to wheel or wholesale power was conduct exempt from the antitrust laws and . . . the District Court's decree improperly preempted the jurisdiction of the Federal Power Commission."

== Subsequent developments ==
=== Remand ===
In accordance with the Supreme Court's order for a remand as to the litigation prong of the case, in United States v. Otter Tail Power Co., the district court (Devitt, J.) reconsidered that aspect of the case. After hearing arguments but without taking additional evidence, the court found:

[T]he repetitive use of litigation by Otter Tail was timed and designed principally to prevent the establishment of municipal electric systems and thereby to preserve defendant's monopoly. I find the litigation comes within the sham exception to the Noerr doctrine as defined by the Supreme Court in California Transport, and reaffirm the Findings and Conclusions previously entered.

Otter Tail appealed this ruling, but the Supreme Court affirmed it without opinion.

=== Aspen case ===
In Aspen Skiing Co. v. Aspen Highlands Skiing Corp., the defendant controlled three of the four ski mountains in Aspen, Colorado. The defendant and plaintiff (owner of the fourth ski mountain) had long engaged in a popular joint-venture arrangement for ski lift tickets. The defendant suddenly terminated the joint venture without a credible business justification. The Supreme Court affirmed a judgment for the plaintiff without addressing the essential facilities doctrine. Instead, the Court spoke of the defendant's termination of a successful program that was beneficial to consumers, failure to establish a plausible business justification, and willingness to sacrifice short-term profits in order to injure competition down the road.

=== Hecht case ===
In Hecht v. Pro-Football, Inc. a group of sports promoters (Hecht) were refused an American Football League (AFL) franchise in Washington, D.C. They sued Pro-Football (PF), owner of the Washington Redskins, a National Football League team operating in D.C., and the D.C. Armory Board, which operated the only stadium in D.C. The Redskins had a 30–year contract with the Armory Board prohibiting it from leasing to any other professional football team. The AFL would not consider the Hecht franchise application until Hecht had a stadium lease. PF would not negotiate a waiver of its exclusive stadium rights until Hecht had a franchise. The D.C. Circuit held that the district court should have instructed the jury concerning the essential facility doctrine, citing Otter Tail as having reaffirmed its announcement in Terminal Railroad.

The court held that PF could not defend by showing that its restrictive contract was reasonable, because:

The garden-variety restrictive covenant does not violate section 1 unless it unreasonably restrains trade; when the restrictive covenant covers an essential facility, however, all possible competition is by definition excluded and the restraint is thus unreasonable per se—provided, of course, that the facility can be shared practically.

=== MCI case ===
In MCI Communications Corp. v. AT&T Co., the Seventh Circuit stated a four–part test that has since been widely cited as authoritative for the essential facilities doctrine:

1. the accused monopolist controls access to an essential facility,
2. the facility cannot reasonably be duplicated by the competitor,
3. the accused monopolist denies access to the competitor, and
4. it was feasible for the accused monopolist to grant access to the competitor.

Some courts have stated a fifth factor perhaps implicit in MCI: that the defendant monopolist lacked a valid business justification for its refusal to deal.

=== Trinko ===
In Verizon Communications Inc. v. Law Offices of Curtis V. Trinko, LLP, the Supreme Court in dicta spoke harshly against the essential facilities doctrine. In Trinko, a customer of a telephone company monopolist brought a treble-damage class action challenging discrimination against a competitor that allegedly caused the class to suffer overpriced and inadequate phone service. The Court held that the only remedies were under the Telecommunications Act of 1996 and dismissed the antitrust claims. It then added that it would not have ruled differently even if it accepted the essential facilities doctrine:

This conclusion would be unchanged even if we considered to be established law the "essential facilities" doctrine crafted by some lower courts, under which the Court of Appeals concluded [Trinko] 's allegations might state a claim. We have never recognized such a doctrine, and we find no need either to recognize it or to repudiate it here. It suffices for present purposes to note that the indispensable requirement for invoking the doctrine is the unavailability of access to the "essential facilities"; where access exists, the doctrine serves no purpose. . . . To the extent respondent's "essential facilities" argument is distinct from its general § 2 argument, we reject it.

== Commentary ==
Alon Kapen addresses two lines of cases in which court have ordered monopolists to stop refusing to deal with competitors. "First, firms may not refuse to deal where they seek to create or maintain a monopoly. Second, a business or group of businesses controlling an "essential facility" has a duty to provide reasonable access to competitors." He sees the Otter Tail case as using both theories, the first based on intent and the second based on effects.

Michael Boudin in contrast sees Otter Tail as emphasizing the defendant's "intent to destroy competition" and "malign intent."

Daniel Troy states that Otter Tail "is commonly cited to justify a per se rule in essential facility cases," but a "close examination" belies that claim. While its fact pattern may fit the essential facilities doctrine, "the Court's reasoning makes clear that it did not treat Otter Tail differently from any other monopolist using its monopoly power to suppress competition in a downstream market." Rather, he insists, "the Court employed a traditional section 2 intent-focused monopolization analysis."

Phillip Areeda criticized the essential facilities doctrine harshly in a much cited article initially delivered as an address at a 1989 program of the ABA Antitrust Section—"The Cutting Edge of Antitrust: Exclusionary Practices. He summarized his arguments with six points:

1. There is no general duty to share.
2. A single firm's facility, as distinct from that of a combination, is "essential" only when it is both critical to the plaintiff's competitive vitality and the plaintiff is essential for competition in the marketplace.
3. No one should be forced to deal unless doing so is likely substantially to improve competition in the marketplace by reducing price or by increasing output or innovation.
4. Even when all these conditions are satisfied, denial of access is never per se unlawful; legitimate business purpose always saves the defendant.
5. The defendant's intention is seldom illuminating, because every firm that denies its facilities to rivals does so to limit competition with itself and increase its profits.
6. No court should impose a duty to deal that it cannot explain or adequately and reasonably supervise.

James Ratner recognizes that there are substantial problems in administering the essential facilities doctrine, but he argues that addressing denials of access to essential facilities is socially necessary:

If a facility is essential, the market in which it produces has become like a dead mouse on the kitchen floor. No one wants to pick up the mouse, and doing so may be repulsive to some, but it is probably best not to leave it there. Finding a facility to be essential means that the competitive process is an unreliable mechanism for correcting significant short-run welfare losses. The market requires some form of intervention, or those losses will persist.

Ratner concedes that vertical behavior such as refusals to allow access to essential facilities "fall under criticism that the behavior does not create new power and may be efficient." Critics then argue that the real economic problem is caused by the monopoly, not by the behavior. That criticism, Ratner argues, does not adequately address the problem of whether to prohibit the activities because they are socially harmful even without increasing market power. If nothing else, "the market power possessed by essential facilities suggests that denial of access frequently will create economically harmful output reduction without increasing or maintaining market power." Therefore, the essential facilities doctrine provides "the only meaningful remedy for these harmful denials" and unfortunately that "requires someone, usually a poorly equipped federal court," to impose judicial regulation. "While such judicial regulation has unavoidable drawbacks," nonetheless, "ignoring the essential facility problem is to ignore one of the basic harms [that the antitrust] laws seek to correct."

Glen Robinson argues that "the essential facilities doctrine provides the proper framework for analyzing both regulatory and antitrust requirements for forced dealing or sharing among rivals." In deciding what is an essential facility, Robinson deprecates the distinction between tangible assets (such as the transmission lines in Otter Tail) and intellectual property, based on the claim that it "is critical for encouraging owners to invest in innovation." He points out:

An incentives problem is created any time one firm is permitted to free-ride on a competitor's investments, whether those investments are represented by tangible assets or intellectual property. Forced sharing of an unpatented or uncopyrighted gizmo undermines investment incentives to the same degree as forced sharing of a patented or copyrighted widget. In the former case, the owner's common law property right in the unpatented widget is entitled to the same legal protection as the property right in the patented gizmo for basically the same reason-to protect settled expectations and the incentive to create wealth. Innovation is merely one form of investment in wealth-creating activity. Regardless of the form of the investment, the ultimate task is to accommodate both the general laws of property and the special laws of antitrust.

Instead, he argues, the proper basis for any distinction is "to examine the underlying interest at stake." Thus, "courts should be skeptical about ordering a firm to share new technologies promising only uncertain returns to the investing firm" because a "firm's investment incentives are especially sensitive to the firm's ability to capture all of the upside return, particularly if it cannot share the downside loss." In such circumstances, "a court should force sharing of essential information only if there is no alternative method of accomplishing the purpose of establishing workable competition."

Robinson disagrees with Judge Posner's view that "forced sharing of facilities deemed to be naturally monopolistic can [never] serve a legitimate competitive purpose." Robinson argues that "in some cases the essential facilities doctrine is properly invoked to prevent a monopolist from leveraging its power from one market into another by withholding access to an input that is needed in the second market." Also, "forced sharing might be the only vehicle for testing [false claims that] a market is naturally monopolistic," as in the case of the long-distance telecommunications market. Robinson concludes that a well-defined essential facilities doctrine is preferable to "the amorphous and untheorized 'it-all-depends' principle followed in Aspen Skiing."

== See also ==
- Essential facilities doctrine
