= Providence Fruit and Produce Warehouse Company Building =

- U.S. National Register of Historic Places
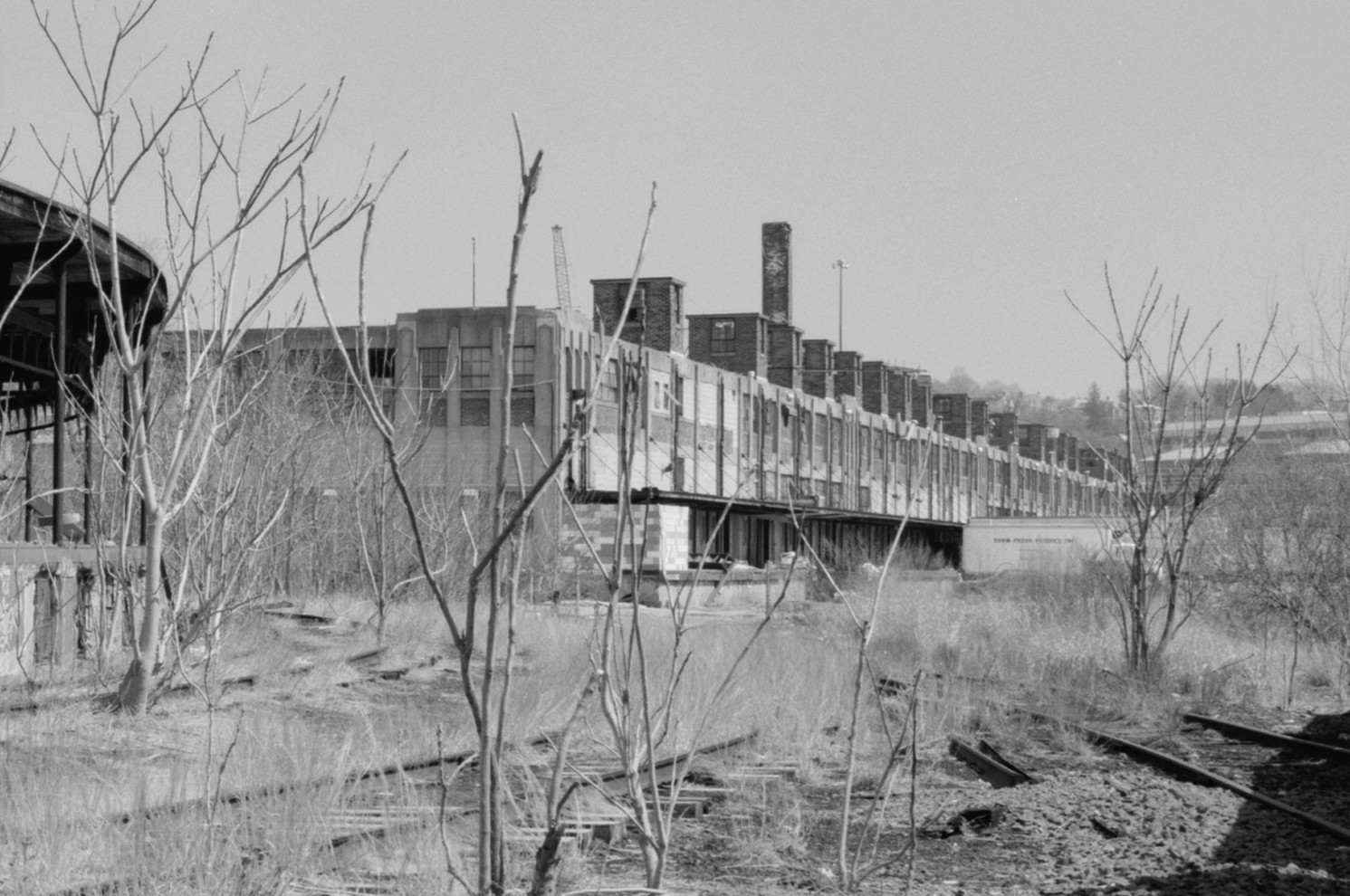
- undated HABS photo

- Location within Rhode Island Location within the United States
- Location: Providence, Rhode Island
- Coordinates: 41°49′37″N 71°25′18″W
- Area: 4 acres (1.6 ha)
- Built: 1929
- Architect: Jenks & Ballou
- Architectural style: Moderne
- NRHP reference No.: 05000583
- Added to NRHP: June 10, 2005

The Providence Fruit and Produce Warehouse Company Building was a historic building located at 6-64 Harris Avenue in Providence, Rhode Island. The building, a large three story warehouse facility, was built in 1929 by Jenks & Ballou, architects and engineers, with modest Moderne styling. The building served from 1929 to 1998 as the major distribution center for fresh fruits and vegetables in the state of Rhode Island, and was one of the centerpieces of the provisioning warehouse district of Providence north of the city center. Several of its bays were demolished in the 1980s to make way for a highway ramp, and the building was taken over by the state in 1998 and closed. The building was listed on the National Register of Historic Places in 2005.

The building was demolished in 2008 by Carpionato Properties to great controversy from local government and citizens.

== See also ==
- National Register of Historic Places listings in Providence, Rhode Island
