= Aspen Skiing Co. v. Aspen Highlands Skiing Corp. =

- Supreme Court of the United States

Argued March 27, 1985 Decided June 19, 1985
- Full case name: Aspen Skiing Co. v. Aspen Highlands Skiing Corp.
- Citations: 472 U.S. 585 (more) 105 S. Ct. 2847; 86 L. Ed. 2d 467; 1985 U.S. LEXIS 115; 53 U.S.L.W. 4818; 1985-2 Trade Cas. (CCH) ¶ 66,653

Case history
- Prior: Aspen Highlands Skiing Corp. v. Aspen Skiing Co., 738 F.2d 1509 (10th Cir. 1984)

Holding
- The question of intent is relevant to the offense of monopolization under § 2 of the Sherman Act in determining whether the challenged conduct is fairly characterized as "exclusionary," "anticompetitive," or "predatory." The monopolist did not merely reject a novel offer to participate in a cooperative venture that had been proposed by a competitor, but instead changed a pattern of distribution that had originated in a competitive market and had persisted for several years without any efficiency justification for doing so.

Court membership
- Chief Justice Warren E. Burger Associate Justices William J. Brennan Jr. · Byron White; Thurgood Marshall · Harry Blackmun; Lewis F. Powell Jr. · William Rehnquist; John P. Stevens · Sandra Day O'Connor

Case opinion
- Majority: Stevens, joined by unanimous
- White took no part in the consideration or decision of the case.

Laws applied
- Sherman Antitrust Act

Aspen Skiing Co. v. Aspen Highlands Skiing Corp., 472 U.S. 585 (1985), was a United States Supreme Court case that decided whether a dominant firm's unilateral refusal to deal with a competitor could establish a monopolization claim under Section 2 of the Sherman Act. The unanimous Supreme Court agreed with the 10th Circuit that terminating a pro-consumer joint venture without a legitimate business justification could constitute illegal monopolization. However, its decision created an exception to the general rule that firms can decide with whom to do business absent collusion, sparking significant controversy about the appropriate scope of this exception. In a subsequent case, Verizon Communications Inc. v. Law Offices of Curtis V. Trinko, LLP, Justice Scalia, writing for the majority, stated that Aspen Skiing is "at or near the outer boundary of § 2 liability." Although its holding has been narrowed, this case's relevance remains contested, especially in the context of refusals to license intellectual property.

== Facts ==
Aspen Highlands and Aspen Skiing Co. were rival ski resorts in Aspen, Colorado. Throughout his ownership, Aspen Highlands founder Whip Jones remained at odds with Aspen Skiing Company, which owned and operated the three other Aspen ski areas: Aspen Mountain (Ajax), Buttermilk and Snowmass.

In every season, but one, from 1962 to 1977, Highlands and Ski Co. collaborated to offer a 6-day, All-Aspen ticket. Revenues from All-Aspen ticket sales were divided according to which hills skiers used. Multi-area tickets became popular with consumers and by 1977 made up over one third of the market.

Despite more than a decade of cooperation, Ski Co. management grew discontent with the All-Aspen ticket. Complaining that monitoring ticket-holders' use was cumbersome and inaccurate and that the All-Aspen ticket attracted customers who would otherwise buy Ski Co.'s 3-area, 6-day ticket, Ski Co. management recommended abandoning the All-Aspen ticket for the 1978–79 season. Accordingly, the Ski Co. board offered Highlands a fixed percentage of the revenue significantly below Highland's usual rate to continue the All-Aspen ticket for the 1978–79 season. As one board member suggested, it was an offer Highlands "could not accept" and the All-Aspen ticket vanished.

Although Highlands sought other ways to offer multi-area passes to compete with Ski Co., Ski Co. successfully thwarted its efforts. Ski Co. refused to sell Highlands any lift tickets, even at retail value. It also refused to accept vouchers backed by local banks for the full cash-value of retail price lift tickets. Eventually, Highlands replaced vouchers with American Express Traveler's Checks or money orders. While Ski Co. accepted these, the product was inconvenient compared to the All-Aspen ticket and Highland's share of the Aspen downhill skiing market sank from 20.5% in the 1976–77 season to only 11% in the 1980–81 season.

In 1979, Highlands filed a complaint against Ski Co. alleging illegal monopolization in violation of Section 2 of the Sherman Act.

== Procedural history ==
A jury in the United States District Court for the District of Colorado found that Ski Co. maintained its monopoly through anticompetitive means in violation of the Sherman Act. The District Court awarded Highlands $7,500,000 in treble damages, costs, attorneys' fees and issued a temporary injunction requiring revival of the All-Aspen ticket. Ski Co. appealed the decision, arguing that its refusal to cooperate with a competitor could not constitute illegal monopolization as a matter of law. However, the 10th Circuit affirmed the jury verdict, finding that Ski Co.'s refusal to cooperate could constitute illegal monopolization applying either of the two available tests: (1) the anticompetitive effect and intent test and (2) the essential facilities doctrine.

The Supreme Court granted cert and affirmed the 10th Circuit's decision based on anticompetitive intent, without analyzing the essential facilities doctrine.

== Judgment ==
The Supreme Court held that Ski Co.'s refusal to deal with Highlands, despite the historical success of their joint-venture, could constitute illegal monopolization because it deprived consumers of a superior All-Aspen ticket option, injured Highlands' ability to offer competitive multi-area tickets, and, "perhaps most significant," it lacked any efficiency justification. As the Court recognized in Lorain Journal, a firm's right to choose with whom to do business, or not, is important, but not "unqualified."

A firm's refusal to engage in a specific joint venture can still be legally significant and, under certain conditions, lead to liability—particularly for a monopolist. The right to choose one's customers and associates is fundamental, but it exists alongside antitrust laws designed to prevent the abuse of market power. Therefore, a monopolist's decision to terminate a long-standing cooperative venture (like the joint ski pass) may cross the line from a legitimate business choice into an illegal exclusionary practice.

The court assessed and rejected all of Ski Co.'s proffered justifications for its refusals to deal. Ski Co. attempted to justify its termination of the All-Aspen ticket by suggesting that use monitoring was too inaccurate, but the Court pointed out Ski Co. already monitored usage on its own hills. Ski Co. further argued that it refused to accept Highland's "Adventure-Pack" coupons, even though they were redeemable for cash at local banks, because were cumbersome to process. However, the Court upheld factual findings that these vouchers were no more difficult to process than credit cards. Finally, Ski Co. argued that it ended its relationship with Highlands in order to distance itself from what, Ski Co. argued, were inferior slopes. The Court rejected this argument as implausible for two reasons: First, consumers could differentiate and assess quality on their own by choosing where to ski; Second, Ski Co. associated itself with "inferior products in other markets."

Rejecting all proffered justifications, the Court found that Ski Co. sacrificed short-term profits from selling Highlands lift tickets at retail prices in the hope of long-term anticompetitive gains from injuring their rival. This conduct could support a monopolization claim.

== Criticism ==
Aspen Skiing was criticized for its handing of economic issues and its controversial injunction requiring cooperation.

=== Inadequate analysis of exclusionary effects ===
In its caution to avoid imposing inappropriate duties to deal, the Court focused significant attention on the history of successful joint-ventures to illustrate that such conduct was possible and beneficial. As critics point out, however, this analysis alone does not support an antitrust violation. If a joint-venture produces efficiencies, both parties should be able to reach an agreement without judicial intervention. Therefore, the discontinuation a joint-venture should not be suspect except in very narrow circumstances where one rival has the ability to exclude the other from the market. In this case, Ski Co. did not explicitly exclude Highlands since it did not prohibit its ski customers from also purchasing passes from Highlands. Still, Ski Co. might have functionally excluded Highlands. With three of the four Aspen mountains, Ski Co. enjoyed significant economies of scale. It also employed a non-linear pricing structure, offering significantly lower rates for multi-day passes over single-day passes. Customers choosing Ski Co.'s multi-area, multi-day passes may choose not to purchase Highlands passes since they already sunk the cost of the Ski Co. ticket. While this exclusion could raise antitrust concerns, the Court did not address the central issues: whether there were economies of scale, whether there were sufficient day-pass skiers to avoid harm from exclusion in the multi-area/multi-day pass market, whether the non-linear pricing structure lead to exclusion.

Despite its emphasis on prior dealing, the Court did not wholly disregard exclusion. When discussing consumer preferences, the Court referenced a survey in the record indicating that over half of respondents "wanted to ski Highlands, but would not" and about 40% responded that "they would not be skiing at the mountain of their choice because their ticket could not permit it." The Court, quoting the 10th Circuit decision, also "noted that by refusing to cooperate with Highlands, Ski Co. became the only business in Aspen that could offer a multi-day multi-mountain skiing experience." While neither the Supreme Court nor the 10th Circuit analyzed how exclusion from the multi-day/multi-area sub-market impacted the downhill skiing market as a whole, these facts may be relevant to finding the exclusion necessary for a monopolization claim.

=== Improper market definition ===
Neither the 10th Circuit nor the Supreme Court engaged in significant analysis of the relevant market. This, however, was not an oversight. The 10th Circuit refused to hear Ski Co.'s appeal of the relevant market instruction because they failed to properly object during the trial. Ski Co. argued that the relevant market should be decided by the judge as a matter of law (applying the Small, but Significant and Non-Transitory Increase in Price or SSNIP test), not the jury. The trial court judge disagreed, reinforcing the idea that market definition is generally a question of fact. Ski Co. failed to object to the jury instruction's emphasis on relevant submarkets. Therefore, the appeals courts adopted the jury findings that " the relevant product submarket was downhill skiing services in the Aspen area, including multi-area and multi-day lift tickets" and "the relevant geographic submarket was the Aspen area." Criticism of this conclusion falls on the jury, not the judges.

While the jury apparently accepted the analysis of the Plaintiff's marketing expert, who emphasized that Highlands and Ski Co. competed over skiers who already decided to come to Aspen, Ski Co. argued that this limited geographic market definition overlooked the fact that most Aspen skiers came from outside Colorado, suggesting that Aspen resorts actually competed with skiing destinations throughout North America. A wider geographic market could mean Ski Co. lacked the requisite monopoly power for a conviction under Section 2. While the court alludes to the difference between multi-area/multi-day packages and single-day passes, it does not question the jury's finding.

=== Inappropriate injunctive relief ===
The injunction requiring cooperation to offer an All-Aspen ticket was widely criticized. First, since cooperation failed in the market, an injunction to cooperate forces the court to play the role of regulator, overseeing the price-setting and other complex terms of the contract. Second, requiring cooperation can make it easier for rivals to illegally collude in markets outside the joint-venture. In fact, in 1975, when Highlands and Ski Co. were cooperating to offer the All-Aspen ticket, the Colorado Attorney General sued both of them for alleged price-fixing. The case settled with a consent decree allowing the All-Aspen ticket to continue.

== Subsequent case law ==
As the Supreme Court stated in Verizon Communications v. Law Offices of Curtis V. Trinko, Aspen is "[t]he leading case imposing § 2 liability for refusal to deal with competitors." Aspen "is at or near the outer boundary of § 2 liability" and represents a "limited exception" to a firm's right to choose with whom to do business that applies when a monopolist is willing to "forsake short-term profits to achieve an anticompetitive end." Subsequent cases have applied and refined Aspen's holding:

- Eastman Kodak Co. v. Image Tech. Servs., Inc., 504 U.S. 451(1992) (finding protection of intellectual property qualified as a valid business justification for a monopolist's unilateral refusal to deal, but this justification does not extend to products or services outside the scope of the patent)
- In re Indep. Serv. Organizations Antitrust Litig. (Xerox), 203 F.3d 1322 (Fed. Cir. 2000) (Applying Kodak, without citing Aspen, the Court found no antitrust liability for refusal to license intellectual property protected by patents and copyrights because IP-right holders enjoy the statutory right to exclude even when there is a risk of anticompetitive harm)
- LePage's Inc. v. 3M, 324 F.3d 141, 150 (3d Cir. 2003) (Citing Aspen, the Court required the defendant monopolist to justify its exclusionary dealings and loyalty discount practices with a legitimate business purpose)
- Verizon Communications v. Law Offices of Curtis V. Trinko, LLP, 540 U.S. 398 (2004) (Distinguishing Aspen, the Court found no antitrust liability for a monopolist's unilateral refusal to cooperate with a rival when there was no history of prior cooperation because, unlike the termination of a successful joint-venture, refusal to enter a cooperative agreement does not create a presumption that the monopolist sacrificed short-term profits for future anticompetitive gain)
- Pacific Bell Telephone Co. v. linkLine Communications, Inc., 555 U.S. 438 (2009) (finding, absent a duty to deal as existed in Aspen, a monopolist's practice of charging rivals high wholesale prices, while charging direct consumers low retail prices, known as "price-squeezing," is not cognizable under the Sherman Act)
