= Monopolization =

Concept in antitrust law

In United States antitrust law, monopolization is illegal monopoly behavior. The main categories of prohibited behavior include exclusive dealing, price discrimination, refusing to supply an essential facility, product tying and predatory pricing. Monopolization is a federal crime under Section 2 of the Sherman Antitrust Act of 1890. It has a specific legal meaning, which is parallel to the "abuse" of a dominant position in EU competition law, under TFEU article 102. It is also illegal in Australia under the Competition and Consumer Act 2010 (CCA). Section 2 of the Sherman Act states that any person "who shall monopolize . . . any part of the trade or commerce among the several states, or with foreign nations shall be deemed guilty of a felony." Section 2 also forbids "attempts to monopolize" and "conspiracies to monopolize". Generally this means that corporations may not act in ways that have been identified as contrary to precedent cases.

== Jurisprudential meaning ==
Under long-established precedent, the offense of monopolization under Section 2 of the Sherman Antitrust Act has two elements. First, that the defendant possesses monopoly power in a properly defined market and second that the defendant obtained or maintained that power through conduct deemed unlawfully exclusionary. The mere fact that conduct disadvantages rivals does not, without more, constitute the sort of exclusionary conduct that satisfies this second element. Instead, such conduct must exclude rivals on some basis other than efficiency.

For several decades courts drew the line between efficient and inefficient exclusion by asking whether the conduct under scrutiny was "competition on the merits". Courts equated such competition on the merits with unilateral conduct such as product improvement, the realization of economies of scale, innovation, and the like. Such conduct was lawful per se, since it constituted the normal operation of economic forces that a free economy should encourage. At the same time, courts condemned as "unlawful exclusion" tying contracts, exclusive dealing, and other agreements that disadvantaged rivals. This distinction reflected the economic theory of the time, which saw no beneficial purposes for what Professor Oliver Williamson has called non-standard contracts.

More recently, courts have retained the safe harbor for "competition on the merits". Moreover, the Supreme Court has clarified the standards governing claims of predatory pricing. At the same time, they have relaxed the standards governing other conduct by monopolists. For instance, non-standard contracts that exclude rivals are now lawful if supported by a "valid business reason", unless the plaintiff can establish that the defendant could achieve the same benefits by means of a less restrictive alternative.

Monopolization is defined as the situation when a firm with durable and significant market power. For the court, it will evaluate the firm’s market share. Usually, a monopolized firm has more than 50% market share in a certain geographic area. Some state courts have higher market share requirements for this definition. In-depth analysis of the market and industry is needed for a court to judge whether the market is monopolized. If a company acquires its monopoly by using business acumen, innovation and superior products, it is regarded to be legal; if a firm achieves monopoly through predatory or exclusionary acts, then it leads to anti-trust concern. The typical predatory and exclusionary acts include things such as excessive purchase and supply, pricing, refusal to deal. Business can also justify if it is judged to be monopolized by the court. For example, business can defense that its business conducts bring merits for consumers. Its monopolist success is sourced from the maintenance and willful acquisition of its power. Its market power comes from historic accidence, business acumen and superior product. Therefore monopolization sometimes lead to debate and disputes.

=== Australian law ===
In Australia, monopolization is illegal in accordance with the section 46 of the CCA. Section 46, misuse of market power, states that corporations with significant power in a market are prohibited to use their power in that market or any other market to reduce competition in that market. This includes preventing the entry of competition entering the market, preventing competitive conduct and the demise of competition within the market or any other market related to the corporation with power. More than one corporation can have significant power within a given market.

=== Monopolization court cases ===
- United States v. Kodak. 1921 . In the early 1900s Kodak monopolized the American film industry, controlling 96% of the market. They were required by the American federal government to stop coercing retail stores to sign exclusivity deals with them as they had a hold on a large portion of the market. This prevented entry into the market by other corporations, therefore Kodak was using their market power to minimise competition in the market. Kodak had also violated the antitrust act in the 1930s. Kodak released the worlds first coloured film camera, that required consumers to develop their film at a Kodak processor. It was later enforced that a third party is required to process the coloured images to allow other corporations to enter the market.
- United States v. Microsoft Corp. 2001. Microsoft was accused for its monopolization act over IBM, a software and hardware competitor. Microsoft used its super-market and market domination in the system to exclude its competitors. Therefore, the other operation system suppliers were prevented from installing their software. Microsoft maintains its dominating in operation system by using Microsoft Internet Explorer, Windows operation system and early productivity apps. Furthermore, Microsoft granted its users with a free license if they used its operating system. It also developed a number of add-on software to make sure that its market share was leading in the industry. Therefore, the court judged that Microsoft acquired its market share by using monopolization.
- United States v. Apple Inc. 2012. Apple allegedly conspired with five book publishing companies, intending to disrupt Amazons hold over the ebook market. The publishing company were allegedly unhappy with the price Amazon was offering to sell their ebooks, and that it was diminishing the value of hardback covers. Apple took the opportunity to offer the publishers a deal that allowed the publishers to set a price of up to $14.99, with the contract including a MFN clause that allows Apple to price match if a lower price was offered on a different platform. Publishers would withhold selling their books with Amazon, letting Apple avoid concerns about competing with Amazon. Apple was found guilty of price fixing and was required to pay $450 million in damages.
