= Essential facilities doctrine =

Type of claim of monopolization made under competition laws

The essential facilities doctrine (sometimes also referred to as the essential facility doctrine) is a legal doctrine which describes a particular type of claim of monopolization made under competition laws. In general, it refers to a type of anti-competitive behavior in which a firm with market power uses a "bottleneck" in a market to deny competitors entry into the market. It is closely related to a claim for refusal to deal.

The doctrine has its origins in United States law, but it has been adopted (often with some modification) into the legal systems of the United Kingdom, Australia, South Africa, and the European Union.

== Overview ==
Under the essential facilities doctrine, a monopolist found to own "a facility essential to other competitors" is required to provide reasonable use of that facility, unless some aspect of it precludes shared access. The basic elements of a legal claim under this doctrine under United States antitrust law, which a plaintiff is required to show to establish liability, are:

1. control of the essential facility by a monopolist
2. a competitor’s inability to practically or reasonably duplicate the essential facility
3. the denial of the use of the facility to a competitor; and
4. the feasibility of providing the facility to competitors

The U.S. Supreme Court's ruling in Verizon v. Trinko, 540 U.S. 398 (2004), in effect added a fifth element: absence of regulatory oversight from an agency (the Federal Communications Commission, in that case) with power to compel access.

These elements are difficult for potential plaintiffs to establish for several reasons. It is quite difficult for a plaintiff to demonstrate that a particular facility is "essential" to entry into and/or competition within the relevant market. The plaintiff must demonstrate that the "facility" must be something so indispensable to entry or competition that it would be impossible for smaller firms to compete with the market leader. Likewise, the plaintiff must show that compelling the dominant firm to permit others to use the facility would not interfere with the ability of the dominant firm to serve its own customers.

== Development ==
The first notable case to address the anti-competitive implications of an essential facility was the Supreme Court's judgment in United States v. Terminal Railroad Association, 224 U.S. 383 (1912). A group of railroads controlling all railway bridges and switching yards into and out of St. Louis prevented competing railway companies from offering transportation to and through that destination. The court held it to be an illegal restraint of trade.

Similar decisions include,

- Associated Press v. United States, 326 U.S. 1 (1945), in which the Supreme Court found that the Associated Press bylaws which limited membership and therefore access to copyrighted news services violated the Sherman Act.
- In Lorain Journal Co. v. United States, 342 U.S. 143, 146-49 (1951), The Lorain Journal was the only local business doing news and advertisements in town. The case was that refusing to place an ad for the customers of a small radio station was a Sherman Act violation. In the end, the court accepted an offer to simply accept the advertisements.
- Otter Tail Power Co. v. United States, 410 U.S. 366, 377-79 (1973), in which the Supreme Court found that Otter Tail, an electrical utility which sold electricity at both directly to consumers and to municipalities who resold to consumers, violated the Sherman Act by refusing to supply electricity at wholesale, instead serving customers directly itself.
- Aspen Skiing Co. v. Aspen Highlands Skiing Corp., 472 U.S. 585 (1985), upholding the Lorain Journal decision in holding that Aspen Skiing violated § 2 of the Sherman Act by refusing to honor vouchers and ski lift tickets after it had previously done so.
- Hecht v. Pro Football where potential American Football League franchise did not show they needed Washington's RFK Stadium, the essential facilities doctrine was not met.

== Application of the doctrine ==
There is controversy about what exactly constitutes an "essential facility". While the doctrine has most frequently been applied to natural monopolies such as utilities and owners of transportation facilities, it has also been applied in situations involving intellectual property. For example, it is possible for a court to apply the doctrine in a case where one competitor refuses to sell materials protected by copyright or patent to potential competitors.

== See also ==
- Competition law
- Essential patent
