= Verizon Communications Inc. v. Law Offices of Curtis V. Trinko, LLP =

Verizon Communications v. Law Offices of Curtis V. Trinko, LLP
- Supreme Court of the United States

Argued October 14, 2003 Decided January 13, 2004
- Full case name: Verizon Communications, Petitioner v. Law Offices of Curtis V. Trinko, LLP
- Citations: 540 U.S. 398 (more) 124 S. Ct. 872; 157 L. Ed. 2d 823; 2004 U.S. LEXIS 657

Holding
- Respondent's complaint alleging breach of an incumbent LEC's 1996 Act duty to share its network with competitors does not state a claim under §2 of the Sherman Act.

Court membership
- Chief Justice William Rehnquist Associate Justices John P. Stevens · Sandra Day O'Connor; Antonin Scalia · Anthony Kennedy; David Souter · Clarence Thomas; Ruth Bader Ginsburg · Stephen Breyer

Case opinions
- Majority: Scalia, joined by Rehnquist, O'Connor, Kennedy, Ginsburg, Breyer
- Concurrence: Stevens (in judgment), joined by Souter, Thomas

Verizon Communications v. Law Offices of Curtis V. Trinko, LLP, often shortened to Verizon v. Trinko, 540 U.S. 398 (2004), is a case decided by the Supreme Court of the United States in the field of Antitrust law. It held that the Telecommunications Act of 1996 had not modified the framework of the Sherman Act, preserving claims that satisfy established antitrust standards without creating new claims that go beyond those standards. It also refused to extend the essential facilities doctrine beyond the facts of the Aspen Skiing Co. v. Aspen Highlands Skiing Corp. case.

== See also ==
- Verizon Communications Inc. v. FCC I
- Verizon Communications Inc. v. FCC II
- List of United States Supreme Court cases, volume 540
