= Statute of Westminster 1327 =

Act of the Parliament of England

- Act of Parliament
- Parliament of England
- Long title: None
- Citation: 1 Edw. 3
- Territorial extent: England and Wales; Ireland

Dates
- Royal assent: 1327 by King Edward III
- Commencement: 1327
- Repealed: 27 August 1881

Other legislation
- Amended by: Criminal Statutes Repeal Act 1827; Criminal Statutes (Ireland) Repeal Act 1828; Criminal Law (India) Act 1828; Statute Law Revision Act 1863; Statute Law (Ireland) Revision Act 1872
- Repealed by: Statute Law Revision and Civil Procedure Act 1881
- Relates to: Justices of the Peace Act 1361

Status: Repealed

Text of statute as originally enacted

The Statute of Westminster 1327 (1 Edw. 3), also known as Statute of Westminster IV, was a law of Edward III of England.

The law included possibly the earliest recorded mention of conductors, stipulating that the wages of conductors (conveyors) of soldiers from the shires to the place of assembly would no longer be a charge upon the Shire. The statute also provided, for the first time, for the formal appointment of keepers of the peace, a position transformed in 1361 by the Justices of the Peace Act 1361 (34 Edw. 3. c. 1) into justices of the peace.

== Subsequent developments ==
The act was extended to Ireland by Poynings' Law 1495 (10 Hen. 7. c. 22 (I)).

The whole act was repealed by section 3 of, and the schedule to, the Statute Law Revision and Civil Procedure Act 1881 (44 & 45 Vict. c. 59).
