= Statute of Provisors =

Act of the Parliament of England

Statue of Provisors
- Act of Parliament
- Parliament of England
- Long title: The King and other lords shall present unto benefices of their own, or their ancestors foundation, and not the bishop of Rome.
- Citation: 25 Edw. 3. Stat. 4; (Ruffhead: 25 Edw. 3. Stat. 6)
- Territorial extent: England and Wales; Ireland

Dates
- Royal assent: 1351
- Commencement: 9 February 1351 (Note: Start of session.)
- Repealed: 30 July 1948

Other legislation
- Repealed by: Statute Law Revision Act 1948

Status: Repealed

Text of statute as originally enacted

The English statute usually called Statute of Provisors (25 Edw. 3. Stat. 4), otherwise termed "The Statute of Provisors of Benefices", or anciently De provisoribus. This measure was central to a long disagreement between the English kings and the Roman Curia, concerning filling of ecclesiastical benefices.

== Background ==
The Pope claimed the right to temporarily suspend the right of the patron, and nominated on his own authority, a successor to the vacant benefice. The papal nominee was then called a provisor. The resulting possession by Italians of church property in England provoked serious resistance. Pope Gregory IX (1227–41) pronounced against the propriety of such provisions as it interfered with the rights of lay patrons. And Pope Innocent IV expressed, in 1253, general disapprobation of these nominations.

From the recitals of "The Statute of Provisors" it appears that the bestowal by the pope of English benefices and ecclesiastical possessions "as if he had been patron or avowee ... as he was not of right by the law of England", and his "accroching to him the seignories" was complained of as not only an illegal injury to the property rights of particular patrons, but also as injurious spiritually and economically to the community in general. The "holy church of England" was said to have been founded by the sovereigns and the nobles to inform them and the people of the law of God and also to make hospitalities, alms, and other works of charity in the places where churches were founded, and possessions assigned for such purposes to prelates, religious, and other people of holy church; and these purposes were said to be defeated by this granting of benefices to aliens who did not, and to cardinals who might not, live in England "and to others as well aliens as denizens".

Certain of the economic evils had been dealt with by a Statute of Edward I of England (35 Edw. 1. St. 1, c. 1, 1306–07), forbidding alien priors or governors of a religious house to impose charges or burdens on their houses and forbidding abbots, priors or other religious to send out of the kingdom any tax imposed on them. But the "Statute of Provisors" recites that the evils complained of in the petition leading to this Statute of Edward I still continue, and that "our holy father, the Pope", still reserves to his collation benefices in England, giving them to aliens and denizens and taking first fruits and other profits, the purchasers of benefices taking out of the kingdom a great part of its treasure.

== Statutes ==
The statute enacts that elections of bishops shall be free, that owners of advowsons shall have free collation and presentment, and that attempted reservation, collation, or provision by the Court of Rome shall cause the right of collation to revert to the king.

Later statutes are 27 Edw. 3. St. 1, c. 1; 38 Edw. 3. St. 2; 3 Ric. 2; 7 Ric. 2. c. 12; 12 Ric. 2. c. 15; 13 Ric. 2. St. 2; 16 Ric. 2. c. 5, and finally in the parliament of 1400–1, the statute 2 Hen. 4. cc. 3, 4.

== Subsequent developments ==
The act was extended to Ireland by Poynings' Law 1495 (10 Hen. 7. c. 22 (I)).

The whole act was repealed by section 1 of, and the first schedule to, the Statute Law Revision Act 1948 (11 & 12 Geo. 6. c. 62), which came into force on 30 July 1948.

== See also ==
- Alien priory
- Benefit of clergy
