= Fur Act 1337 =

Act of the Parliament of England

- Act of Parliament
- Parliament of England
- Long title: Who only may wear fur.
- Citation: 11 Edw. 3. c. 4
- Territorial extent: England and Wales; Ireland

Dates
- Royal assent: 1337
- Commencement: 27 September 1337 (Note: Start of session.)
- Repealed: England and Wales: 28 July 1863; Ireland: 10 August 1872

Other legislation
- Amended by: Continuance, etc. of Laws Act 1603
- Repealed by: England and Wales: Statute Law Revision Act 1863; Ireland: Statute Law (Ireland) Revision Act 1872

Status: Repealed

Text of statute as originally enacted

The Fur Act 1337 (11 Edw. 3. c. 4) was an act of the Parliament of England passed during the reign of Edward III that limited the class of people who might wear fur to earls, barons, knights, prelates of the Church of England, and those who expended one hundred pounds at least by the year.

Item, it is accorded, That no Man nor Woman of the said Lands of England, Ireland, Wales, or Scotland within the King's Power, of what Estate or Condition that he be, the King, Queen, and their Children, the Prelates, Earls, Barons, Knights, and Ladies, and people of Holy Church, which may expend by Year an C. li of their Benefices at the least, to the very Value, only except, shall wear no Fur in his Clothes, that shall be bought after the said Feast of Saint Michael, upon the Forfeiture of the said Fur. And further to be punished at the King's Will.

== Subsequent developments ==
The act was extended to Ireland by Poynings' Law 1495 (10 Hen. 7. c. 22 (I)).

The act was repealed in general terms, alongside "all other acts hereto made concerning Apparell", for England and Wales by section 7 of the Continuance, etc. of Laws Act 1603 (1 Jas. 1. c. 25).

The whole act was repealed for England and Wales by section 1 of, and the schedule to, the Statute Law Revision Act 1863 (26 & 27 Vict. c. 125), which came into force on 28 July 1863.

The whole act was repealed for Ireland by section 1 of, and the schedule to, the Statute Law (Ireland) Revision Act 1872 (35 & 36 Vict. c. 98), which came into force on 10 August 1872.
