= Forfeitures Act 1360 =

Act of the Parliament of England

- Act of Parliament
- Parliament of England
- Long title: There shall be no forfeiture of lands for treason of dead persons not attainted.
- Citation: 34 Edw. 3. c. 12
- Territorial extent: England and Wales; Ireland

Dates
- Royal assent: 1360
- Commencement: 1360
- Repealed: 30 July 1948

Other legislation
- Repealed by: Statute Law Revision Act 1948

Status: Repealed

Text of statute as originally enacted

The Forfeitures Act 1360 (34 Edw. 3. c. 12) was an act of the Parliament of England that prohibited "forfeiture for treason of [by] dead persons not attainted or judged in their lives."

Prior to the act being passed, land and goods had been confiscated from the surviving relatives of dead people as a penalty for treason committed by the deceased even though they had not been convicted during their lifetime. The act prevented the posthumous seizure of property for treason except where the prior owner had been convicted while they were alive.

== Subsequent developments ==
The act was extended to Ireland by Poynings' Law 1495 (10 Hen. 7. c. 22 (I)).

The whole act was repealed by section 1 of, and the first schedule to, the Statute Law Revision Act 1948 (11 & 12 Geo. 6. c. 62), which came into force on 30 July 1948.

== See also ==
- High treason in the United Kingdom
- Treason Act
