= De natis ultra mare =

Act of the Parliament of England

Status of Children Born Abroad Act 1350
- Act of Parliament
- Parliament of England
- Long title: A Statute for those who are born in Parts beyond Sea.
- Citation: 25 Edw. 3. Stat. 1 (Note: This is the citation in The Statutes of the Realm.); 25 Edw. 3. Stat. 2 (Note: This is the citation in The Statutes at Large.)
- Territorial extent: England and Wales; Ireland

Dates
- Royal assent: 1 March 1351
- Commencement: 9 February 1351 (Note: Start of session.)

Other legislation
- Amended by: British Nationality and Status of Aliens Act 1914; Statute Law Revision Act 1948

Status: Partially repealed

Text of statute as originally enacted

Revised text of statute as amended

Text of the A Statute for those who are born in Parts beyond Sea (1350) as in force today (including any amendments) within the United Kingdom, from legislation.gov.uk.

De natis ultra mare (25 Edw. 3. Stat. 1), also known as the Status of Children Born Abroad Act 1350, was an English statute during the reign of Edward III. It regulated rights of those born overseas, and was an early precursor of British nationality law, and others. Dating from 1351, during the early part of the Hundred Years' War, it addressed the issue of inheritance by foreign-born children, a topical problem.

This statute of 25 Edw. 3 was invoked over 200 years later, in two matters; in the first of those, it did not prove effective since the outcome went in the other direction, but in the second it was significant. In the debate on the succession to Elizabeth I, it was thought by some to be telling against claimants of the House of Stuart. In Calvin's Case, it was also brought up, to argue against the proposed right of inheritance in England of the Scottish post-nati (those born after the Union of Crowns of 1603).

== Text ==
The statute is in Law French:

... la lei de la Corone Dengletere est, & ad este touz jours tiele, que les enfantz des Rois Dengleterre, queu part qils soient neez en Engleterre ou aillors, sont ables & deivent porter heritage, apres la mort lour auncestors; la queule lei notre Seigneur le Roi, les [ditz] Prelatz, Countz, Barons, & autres gantz, & tote la Cõe assemblez el dit plement, approevent & afferment pour touz jours ...

(The text uses scribal abbreviations which cannot be reproduced here; they have been expanded instead.) Statutes of the Realm Volume 1 (1810) translates this into modern English as follows:

... the Law of the Crown of England is, and always hath been such, that the Children of the Kings of England, in whatsoever Parts they be born, in England or elsewhere, be able and ought to bear the Inheritance after the death of their Ancestors; which Law our ... Lord the King, the ... Prelates Earls, Barons, and other great Men, and all the Commons assembled in this Parliament, do approve and affirm for ever ...

This "traditional translation" is also given by the UK National Archives at legislation.gov.uk. The ellipses represent words repealed by the Statute Law Revision Act 1948, including the lengthy preamble and the word "said". This is the only part in force today, the rest having been repealed by the British Nationality and Status of Aliens Act 1914 (4 & 5 Geo. 5. c. 17). These repeals are specified in English; they apply to the authorised revised printing in Statutes of the Realm by virtue of section 19 of the Interpretation Act 1978.

Following this, three named persons (Henry son of John Beaumont, Elizabeth daughter of Guy Bryan, and Giles son of Ralph Daubeney, the last being the grandfather of Sir Giles Daubeney), and any others the king saw fit to name, were extended the same right of inheritance. The next clause includes generally any child of English subjects born abroad. Finally, ecclesiastical courts were given jurisdiction to judge claims of bastardy in the case of such children, as they had normally in cases of children born in England.
