= List of acts of the Parliament of England, 1327–1376 =

This is a list of acts of the Parliament of England for the years 1327 until 1376.

For acts passed during the period 1707–1800, see the list of acts of the Parliament of Great Britain. See also the list of acts of the Parliament of Scotland and the list of acts of the Parliament of Ireland.

For acts passed from 1801 onwards, see the list of acts of the Parliament of the United Kingdom. For acts of the devolved parliaments and assemblies in the United Kingdom, see the list of acts of the Scottish Parliament, the list of acts of the Northern Ireland Assembly, and the list of acts and measures of Senedd Cymru; see also the list of acts of the Parliament of Northern Ireland.

For medieval statutes, etc. that are not considered to be acts of Parliament, see the list of English statutes.

The number shown after each act's title is its chapter number. Acts are cited using this number, preceded by the year(s) of the reign during which the relevant parliamentary session was held; thus the Union with Ireland Act 1800 is cited as "39 & 40 Geo. 3. c. 67", meaning the 67th act passed during the session that started in the 39th year of the reign of George III and which finished in the 40th year of that reign. Note that the modern convention is to use Arabic numerals in citations (thus "41 Geo. 3" rather than "41 Geo. III"). Acts of the last session of the Parliament of Great Britain and the first session of the Parliament of the United Kingdom are both cited as "41 Geo. 3".

Acts passed by the Parliament of England did not have a short title; however, some of these acts have subsequently been given a short title by acts of the Parliament of the United Kingdom (such as the Short Titles Act 1896).

Acts passed by the Parliament of England were deemed to have come into effect on the first day of the session in which they were passed. Because of this, the years given in the list below may in fact be the year before a particular act was passed.

== 1327 (1 Edw. 3) ==
The 1st Parliament of King Edward III, which met at Westminster until 9 March 1327.

This session was also traditionally cited as 1 Ed. 3 or 1 E. 3.

Statute of Westminster 1327

=== 1 Edw. 3. Stat. 1 ===
The 2nd Parliament of King Edward III, which met at Westminster from 15 September 1327 until 23 September 1327.

This session was also traditionally cited as 1 Edw. 3. stat. 1, 1 Edw. 3. St. 1, 1 Edw. 3. st. 1, 1 Ed. 3. Stat. 1, 1 Ed. 3. stat. 1, 1 Ed. 3. St. 1, 1 Ed. 3. st. 1, 1 E. 3. Stat. 1, 1 E. 3. stat. 1, 1 E. 3. St. 1 or 1 E. 3. st. 1.

- (Personal) c. 1 None shall be impeached which took Part with the King against his Father. — repealed by Statute Law Revision and Civil Procedure Act 1881 (44 & 45 Vict. c. 59)
- (Personal) c. 2 The Repeal of the Exile made void. — repealed by Statute Law Revision and Civil Procedure Act 1881 (44 & 45 Vict. c. 59)
- Civil Procedure, etc. Act 1327 c. 3 The Executors of those that were wrongfully slain shall have Action to recover their Testators Goods. All Assurances made to the Rebels by Duress shall be void. — repealed by Statute Law Revision and Civil Procedure Act 1881 (44 & 45 Vict. c. 59)
- (False Judgment) c. 4 Trial of an Averment in a Writ of false Judgement. — repealed by Statute Law Revision and Civil Procedure Act 1881 (44 & 45 Vict. c. 59)
- (Liberty) c. 5 An Averment may he made against false Returns of Bailiffs of liberties. — repealed by Statute Law Revision and Civil Procedure Act 1881 (44 & 45 Vict. c. 59)
- (Attaint) c. 6 An Attaint will lie as well upon the Principal, as upon the Damages. — repealed for England and Wales by Statute Law Revision Act 1863 (26 & 27 Vict. c. 125) and for Ireland by Statute Law (Ireland) Revision Act 1872 (35 & 36 Vict. c. 98)
- (Appeal by Prisoners) c. 7 Inquiry shall be made of Gaolers, which by Duress compel Prisoners to appeal. — repealed for England and Wales by Statute Law Revision Act 1863 (26 & 27 Vict. c. 125) and for Ireland by Statute Law (Ireland) Revision Act 1872 (35 & 36 Vict. c. 98)
- (Offences in Forests) c. 8 How he shall be used that is taken for any Offence in the Forest. Bailment of him. — repealed for England and Wales by Criminal Statutes Repeal Act 1827 (7 & 8 Geo. 4. c. 27), for Ireland by Criminal Statutes (Ireland) Repeal Act 1828 (9 Geo. 4. c. 53) and for India by Criminal Law (India) Act 1828 (9 Geo. 4. c. 74)

=== 1 Edw. 3. Stat. 2 ===
The 3rd Parliament of King Edward III, which met at Lincoln from 7 February 1328 until 5 March 1328.

This session was also traditionally cited as 1 Edw. 3. stat. 1, 1 Edw. 3. St. 2, 1 Edw. 3. st. 2, 1 Ed. 3. Stat. 2, 1 Ed. 3. stat. 2, 1 Ed. 3. St. 2, 1 Ed. 3. st. 2, 1 E. 3. Stat. 2, 1 E. 3. stat. 2, 1 E. 3. St. 2 or 1 E. 3. st. 2.

- (Confirmation of charters, etc.) c. 1 A Confirmation of the Great Charter, and the Charter of the Forest. Perambulation of Forests. — repealed for England and Wales by Statute Law Revision Act 1863 (26 & 27 Vict. c. 125) and for Ireland by Statute Law (Ireland) Revision Act 1872 (35 & 36 Vict. c. 98)
- (Forest) c. 2 How every Person may use his Woods within the Forest. Seizing of Bishops Temporalties. / Housebote (Note: Housebote is the right or privilege of a tenant to take wood from a landlord's estate for the upkeep of a house; (also) the rent paid for this privilege; (the clearing or taking of) wood for this purpose.) and Haybote (Note: Haybote is wood or thorns for the repair of fences; the right of the tenant or commoner to take such material from the landlord's estate, or the common.) within the Forrest. Seizing of Bishop's Temporalties. — repealed by Wild Creatures and Forest Laws Act 1971 (c. 47)
- King's Pardon Act 1327 c. 3 King Edward the Second's Pardon confirmed to the Jews and all others. — repealed for England and Wales by Statute Law Revision Act 1863 (26 & 27 Vict. c. 125) and for Ireland by Statute Law (Ireland) Revision Act 1872 (35 & 36 Vict. c. 98)
- (Crown debts) c. 4 The King's Debts shall be stalled according to the Debtor's Estate. — repealed for England and Wales by Statute Law Revision Act 1863 (26 & 27 Vict. c. 125) and for Ireland by Statute Law (Ireland) Revision Act 1872 (35 & 36 Vict. c. 98)
- (Military service) c. 5 None shall he compelled to go to War out of the Shire where he dwelleth, but, &c. — repealed for England and Wales by Statute Law Revision Act 1863 (26 & 27 Vict. c. 125) and for Ireland by Statute Law (Ireland) Revision Act 1872 (35 & 36 Vict. c. 98)
- (Taxation) c. 6 How Aid granted to the King shall be taxed. — repealed for England and Wales by Statute Law Revision Act 1863 (26 & 27 Vict. c. 125) and for Ireland by Statute Law (Ireland) Revision Act 1872 (35 & 36 Vict. c. 98)
- (Conveyance of soldiers) c. 7 Who shall pay the Wages to Conductors of Soldiers. — repealed for England and Wales by Statute Law Revision Act 1863 (26 & 27 Vict. c. 125) and for Ireland by Statute Law (Ireland) Revision Act 1872 (35 & 36 Vict. c. 98)
- (Beaupleader) c. 8 Nothing shall be taken for Beaupleader. — repealed for England and Wales by Statute Law Revision Act 1863 (26 & 27 Vict. c. 125) and for Ireland by Statute Law (Ireland) Revision Act 1872 (35 & 36 Vict. c. 98)
- (Franchises of cities, etc.) c. 9 A Confirmation of the Liberties of Cities and Boroughs. — repealed by Statute Law (Repeals) Act 1969 (c. 52)
- (Corodies, etc.) c. 10 There shall be no more Grants of Corodies at the King's Request by Bishops, Abbots, &c. — repealed for England and Wales by Statute Law Revision Act 1863 (26 & 27 Vict. c. 125) and for Ireland by Statute Law (Ireland) Revision Act 1872 (35 & 36 Vict. c. 98)
- (Prohibition) c. 11 No Suit shall be made in the Spiritual Court against Minors. — repealed for England and Wales by Statute Law Revision Act 1863 (26 & 27 Vict. c. 125) and for Ireland by Statute Law (Ireland) Revision Act 1872 (35 & 36 Vict. c. 98)
- (Tenure in capite, etc.) c. 12 No Forfeiture, but a Fine shall be made for Alienation of Lands holden of the King. — repealed for England and Wales by Statute Law Revision Act 1863 (26 & 27 Vict. c. 125) and for Ireland by Statute Law (Ireland) Revision Act 1872 (35 & 36 Vict. c. 98)
- (Tenure in capite, etc.) c. 13 Purchasing of Lands holden of the King as of some Honour. — repealed for England and Wales by Statute Law Revision Act 1863 (26 & 27 Vict. c. 125) and for Ireland by Statute Law (Ireland) Revision Act 1872 (35 & 36 Vict. c. 98)
- Maintenance Act 1326 c. 14 None shall commit Maintenance. — repealed by Criminal Law Act 1967 (c. 58)
- (Military service) c. 15 None shall he bound by Writing to come armed to the King, for that every Subject is at his Commandment. — repealed for England and Wales by Statute Law Revision Act 1863 (26 & 27 Vict. c. 125) and for Ireland by Statute Law (Ireland) Revision Act 1872 (35 & 36 Vict. c. 98)
- Justice of the Peace Act 1327 c. 16 Who shall be assigned Justices and Keepers of the Peace. — repealed by Statute Law Revision Act 1948 (11 & 12 Geo. 6. c. 62)
- (Indictments) c. 17 Indictments in the Sheriffs Turn shall be by Roll indented. — repealed by Sheriffs Act 1887 (50 & 51 Vict. c. 55)

=== Sources ===
- Chronological Table of and Index to the Statutes. Vol. 1: To the End of the Session 59 Vict. Sess. 2 (1895) (13th ed.). London: Her Majesty's Stationery Office. 1896. pp. 22–23 – via Google Books.
- Chronological Table of the Statutes: Covering the Period from 1235 to the End of 1971. London: Her Majesty's Stationery Office. 1972. pp. 18–19. ISBN 978-0-11-840096-1 – via Google Books.

== 1328 (2 Edw. 3) ==
The 4th Parliament of King Edward III, which met at Northampton from 24 April 1328 until 14 May 1328.

This session was also traditionally cited as 2 Ed. 3 or 2 E. 3.

The Statute of Northampton:

- (Confirmation of charters) c. 1 A Confirmation of the Great Charter, and the Charter of the Forest. — repealed for England and Wales by Statute Law Revision Act 1863 (26 & 27 Vict. c. 125) and for Ireland by Statute Law (Ireland) Revision Act 1872 (35 & 36 Vict. c. 98)
- Pardons for Felony, Justices of Assize, etc. Act 1328 c. 2 In what Cases only Pardon of Felony shall he granted. Who shall be Justices of Assise, &c. — repealed for England and Wales by Statute Law Revision and Civil Procedure Act 1881 (44 & 45 Vict. c. 59) and for Scotland and Northern Ireland by Statute Law Revision Act 1950 (14 Geo. 6. c. 6)
- (Riding or going armed) c. 3 No Man shall come before the Justices or go or ride armed.— repealed by Criminal Law Act 1967 (c. 58)
- (Sheriff) c. 4 A Confirmation of the Statute of Lincoln, containing the Sufficiency of Sheriffs, &c. — repealed by Sheriffs Act 1887 (50 & 51 Vict. c. 55)
- (Sheriff) c. 5 The Manner how Writs shall be delivered to the Sheriff to be executed. — repealed by Sheriffs Act 1887 (50 & 51 Vict. c. 55)
- (Confirmation of statutes, etc.) c. 6 Justices shall have Authority to punish Breakers of the Peace. — repealed for England and Wales by Statute Law Revision Act 1863 (26 & 27 Vict. c. 125) and for Ireland by Statute Law (Ireland) Revision Act 1872 (35 & 36 Vict. c. 98)
- (Inquiry of past felons, etc.) c. 7 Commissions shall he granted to certain Persons to bear and determine Offences before committed, and to punish the Offenders. — repealed for England and Wales by Statute Law Revision Act 1863 (26 & 27 Vict. c. 125) and for Ireland by Statute Law (Ireland) Revision Act 1872 (35 & 36 Vict. c. 98)
- (Commands in delay of justice) c. 8 No Commandment under the King's Seal shall disturb or delay Justice. — repealed by the Statute Law (Repeals) Act 1969 (c. 52)
- Staples Act 1328 c. 9 All Staples shall cease, and all Merchants may come in and go out with their Merchandises. — repealed for England and Wales by Statute Law Revision Act 1863 (26 & 27 Vict. c. 125) and for Ireland by Statute Law (Ireland) Revision Act 1872 (35 & 36 Vict. c. 98)
- (Pardon of fines) c. 10 The King's Pardon of Fines forfeited. — repealed for England and Wales by Statute Law Revision Act 1863 (26 & 27 Vict. c. 125) and for Ireland by Statute Law (Ireland) Revision Act 1872 (35 & 36 Vict. c. 98)
- (Common Bench) c. 11 The common Bench shall not be removed without Warning by Adjournment. — repealed for England and Wales by Statute Law Revision Act 1863 (26 & 27 Vict. c. 125) and for Ireland by Statute Law (Ireland) Revision Act 1872 (35 & 36 Vict. c. 98)
- (Annexing Hundreds to Counties) c. 12 Hundreds and Wapentakes shall be annexed to Counties, and not let to Ferm. — repealed by Sheriffs Act 1887 (50 & 51 Vict. c. 55)
- (Process for Past Trespasses) c. 13 Process of Trespass committed in the time of King Edward the Second. — repealed for England and Wales by Statute Law Revision Act 1863 (26 & 27 Vict. c. 125) and for Ireland by Statute Law (Ireland) Revision Act 1872 (35 & 36 Vict. c. 98)
- (Measure, etc. of Cloths Imported) c. 14 The Measure and Assise of Clothes of Ray and of Colour. — repealed by Woollen Manufacture Act 1809 (49 Geo. 3. c. 109)
- Keeping of Fairs Act 1328 c. 15 No Person shall keep a Fair longer than he ought to do. — repealed by Statute Law (Repeals) Act 1969 (c. 52)
- (Inquests) c. 16 Nisi prius may be granted as well at the tenants Suit as the Demandants. — repealed by Civil Procedure Acts Repeal Act 1879 (42 & 43 Vict. c. 59)
- (Writs of deceit) c. 17 A Writ of Deceit shall be maintainable in Case of Garnishment in Plea of Land. — repealed for England and Wales by Statute Law Revision Act 1863 (26 & 27 Vict. c. 125) and for Ireland by Statute Law (Ireland) Revision Act 1872 (35 & 36 Vict. c. 98)

=== Sources ===
- Chronological Table of and Index to the Statutes. Vol. 1: To the End of the Session 59 Vict. Sess. 2 (1895) (13th ed.). London: Her Majesty's Stationery Office. 1896. p. 23 – via Google Books.
- Chronological Table of the Statutes: Covering the Period from 1235 to the End of 1971. London: Her Majesty's Stationery Office. 1972. p. 19. ISBN 978-0-11-840096-1 – via Google Books.

== 1330 (4 Edw. 3) ==
The 6th Parliament of King Edward III, which met at York from 11 March 1330 until 21 March 1330.

This session was also traditionally cited as 4 Ed. 3 or 4 E. 3.

- (Confirmation of charters & statutes) c. 1 A Confirmation of all Statutes not repealed. — repealed for England and Wales by Statute Law Revision Act 1863 (26 & 27 Vict. c. 125) and for Ireland by Statute Law (Ireland) Revision Act 1872 (35 & 36 Vict. c. 98)
- (Justices of assise & gaol delivery: justices of the peace) c. 2 The Authority of justices of Assise, Gaol-delivery, and of the Peace. — repealed for England and Wales by Statute Law Revision and Civil Procedure Act 1881 (44 & 45 Vict. c. 59) and for Northern Ireland by Judicature (Northern Ireland) Act 1978 (c. 23)
- Civil Procedure Act 1330 or Purveyance Act 1330 c. 3 Purveyors far the King, Queen, and their Children, and what they may do. — repealed for England and Wales by Statute Law Revision Act 1863 (26 & 27 Vict. c. 125) and for Ireland by Statute Law (Ireland) Revision Act 1872 (35 & 36 Vict. c. 98)
- (Purveyance) c. 4 A Confirmation of the Statute 28 Edw. 1. Stat. 3. c. 2. (Note: Articuli super Cartas (28 Edw. 1. c. 2)) touching Purveyors. — repealed for England and Wales by Statute Law Revision Act 1863 (26 & 27 Vict. c. 125) and for Ireland by Statute Law (Ireland) Revision Act 1872 (35 & 36 Vict. c. 98)
- (Pardon of fines, etc.) c. 5 The King's Pardon of certain Fines, and also of some Money granted to him. — repealed for England and Wales by Statute Law Revision Act 1863 (26 & 27 Vict. c. 125) and for Ireland by Statute Law (Ireland) Revision Act 1872 (35 & 36 Vict. c. 98)
- (Confirmation of 35 Edw. 1. Stat. Karl.) c. 6 The Statute made at Carlisle, Anno 35 Edw. 1. Stat. 1. (Note: Statutum Karlioli (35 Edw. 1)) touching Religious Persons, confirmed. — repealed for England and Wales by Statute Law Revision Act 1863 (26 & 27 Vict. c. 125) and for Ireland by Statute Law (Ireland) Revision Act 1872 (35 & 36 Vict. c. 98)
- (Executors' action for trespass) c. 7 Executors shall have an Action of Trespass for a Wrong done to their Testator. — repealed by Administration of Estates Act 1925 (15 & 16 Geo. 5. c. 23)
- (Passages at the ports) c. 8 At all Passages Men shall pay no more for their Fare than they had wont to do. — repealed for England and Wales by Continuance, etc. of Laws Act 1623 (21 Jas. 1. c. 28) and for Ireland by Statute Law (Ireland) Revision Act 1872 (35 & 36 Vict. c. 98)
- (Hundred: Sheriff) c. 9 Sheriffs. Bailiffs of Hundreds. and Escheators, shall have sufficient in the County. — repealed by Statute Law Revision and Civil Procedure Act 1881 (44 & 45 Vict. c. 59)
- (Receipt of offenders by sheriffs, etc.) c. 10 Sheriffs and Gaolers shall receive Offenders without taking a thing. — repealed for England and Wales by Statute Law Revision Act 1863 (26 & 27 Vict. c. 125) and for Ireland by Statute Law (Ireland) Revision Act 1872 (35 & 36 Vict. c. 98)
- (Justices of assize) c. 11 Justices of Assises, &c. shall enquire of Maintainers, Conspirators, and Champetre's. — repealed for England and Wales by Statute Law Revision and Civil Procedure Act 1881 (44 & 45 Vict. c. 59) and for Scotland and Northern Ireland by Statute Law Revision Act 1950 (14 Geo. 6. c. 6)
- (Assay, etc. of wines) c. 12 Wines shall he assayed, and sold at reasonable Prices. — repealed for England and Wales by Statute Law Revision Act 1863 (26 & 27 Vict. c. 125) and for Ireland by Statute Law (Ireland) Revision Act 1872 (35 & 36 Vict. c. 98)
- (Pardons) c. 13 A Confirmation of the Statute of 2 Edward 3. cap. 2. (Note: Statute of Northampton (2 Edw. 3. c. 2)) touching granting of Pardons. — repealed for England and Wales by Statute Law Revision Act 1863 (26 & 27 Vict. c. 125) and for Ireland by Statute Law (Ireland) Revision Act 1872 (35 & 36 Vict. c. 98)
- (Parliament) c. 14 A Parliament shall be holden once every Year. — repealed for England and Wales by Statute Law Revision Act 1863 (26 & 27 Vict. c. 125) and for Ireland by Statute Law (Ireland) Revision Act 1872 (35 & 36 Vict. c. 98)
- (Farming of hundreds by sheriffs) c. 15 Sheriffs shall let their Hundreds and Wapentakes for the old Ferm. — repealed for England and Wales by Statute Law Revision Act 1863 (26 & 27 Vict. c. 125) and for Ireland by Statute Law (Ireland) Revision Act 1872 (35 & 36 Vict. c. 98)

=== Sources ===
- Chronological Table of and Index to the Statutes. Vol. 1: To the End of the Session 59 Vict. Sess. 2 (1895) (13th ed.). London: Her Majesty's Stationery Office. 1896. p. 23 – via Google Books.
- Chronological Table of the Statutes: Covering the Period from 1235 to the End of 1971. London: Her Majesty's Stationery Office. 1972. p. 19. ISBN 978-0-11-840096-1 – via Google Books.

== 1331 (5 Edw. 3) ==
The 8th Parliament of King Edward III, which met at Westminster from 30 September 1331 until 9 October 1331.

This session was also traditionally cited as 5 Ed. 3 or 5 E. 3.

- (Confirmation of charters) c. 1 The Great Charter and the Charter of the Forest confirmed. — repealed for England and Wales by Statute Law Revision Act 1863 (26 & 27 Vict. c. 125) and for Ireland by Statute Law (Ireland) Revision Act 1872 (35 & 36 Vict. c. 98)
- (Purveyance, Marchalsea) c. 2 Things purveyed for the King's House shall be praised, and Tallies made thereof. Of what People Inquests in the Marshal's Court shall be taken. Redressing of Error there. — repealed for England and Wales by Statute Law Revision Act 1863 (26 & 27 Vict. c. 125) and for Ireland by Statute Law (Ireland) Revision Act 1872 (35 & 36 Vict. c. 98)
- (Confirmation of 35 Edw. 1 Stat. Carlisle) c. 3 A Confirmation of the Statute of Carlisle, made 35 Edw. I. Stat. 1. (Note: Statutum Karlioli (35 Edw. 1)) touching Religious Houses. — repealed for England and Wales by Statute Law Revision Act 1863 (26 & 27 Vict. c. 125) and for Ireland by Statute Law (Ireland) Revision Act 1872 (35 & 36 Vict. c. 98)
- (Qualification of sheriffs) c. 4 None shall be Sheriff, Escheator, or Bailiff of Franchise, unless be he hath sufficient in the County. — repealed by Sheriffs Act 1887 (50 & 51 Vict. c. 55)
- Sale of Wares after Close of Fair Act 1331 c. 5 The Penalty if any do sell Ware at a Fair after it is ended. — repealed by Statute Law Revision Act 1958 (6 & 7 Eliz. 2. c. 46)
- (Attaints) c. 6 Nisi prius shall be granted in Attaint, but no Essoin or Protection. Days given. — repealed for England and Wales by Statute Law Revision Act 1863 (26 & 27 Vict. c. 125) and for Ireland by Statute Law (Ireland) Revision Act 1872 (35 & 36 Vict. c. 98)
- (Attaints) c. 7 Attaint shall be granted in trespass, if the Damage pass xl s. — repealed for England and Wales by Statute Law Revision Act 1863 (26 & 27 Vict. c. 125) and for Ireland by Statute Law (Ireland) Revision Act 1872 (35 & 36 Vict. c. 98)
- Custody by Marshals of King's Bench Act 1331 c. 8 The Marshals of the King's Bench shall not bail Felons. — repealed by Statute Law Revision Act 1887 (50 & 51 Vict. c. 59)
- (Unlawful attachment, etc. forbidden) c. 9 None shall be attached or forejudged contrary to the Great Charter, or the Law. — repealed by Statute Law (Repeals) Act 1969 (c. 52)
- (Jurors) c. 10 The Punishment of a Juror that is Ambidexter, and taketh Money. — repealed for England and Wales by Juries Act 1825 (6 Geo. 4. c. 50) and for Ireland by Juries (Ireland) Act 1833 (3 & 4 Will. 4. c. 91)
- (Arrest: criminal procedure) c. 11 Process against those that be appealed, indicted, or outlawed in one County, and remain in another. — repealed by Statute Law Revision Act 1948 (11 & 12 Geo. 6. c. 62)
- (Outlawry) c. 12 What is requisite to be done to have their Pardons allowed which be outlawed. — repealed by Civil Procedure Acts Repeal Act 1879 (42 & 43 Vict. c. 59)
- (Outlawry) c. 13 What is requisite where any Person will avoid an Outlawry by Imprisonment. — repealed by Civil Procedure Acts Repeal Act 1879 (42 & 43 Vict. c. 59)
- Arrest, etc., of Night Walkers, etc. Act 1331 c. 14 Night-walkers and suspected Persons shall be safely kept. — repealed by Repeal of Obsolete Statutes Act 1856 (19 & 20 Vict. c. 64)

=== Sources ===
- Chronological Table of and Index to the Statutes. Vol. 1: To the End of the Session 59 Vict. Sess. 2 (1895) (13th ed.). London: Her Majesty's Stationery Office. 1896. p. 23 – via Google Books.
- Chronological Table of the Statutes: Covering the Period from 1235 to the End of 1971. London: Her Majesty's Stationery Office. 1972. p. 19. ISBN 978-0-11-840096-1 – via Google Books.

== 1335 (9 Edw. 3) ==
This session was also traditionally cited as 9 Ed. 3 or 9 E. 3.

=== 9 Edw. 3. Stat. 1 ===
The 14th Parliament of King Edward III, which met at York from 26 May 1335 until 3 June 1335.

This session was also traditionally cited as 9 Edw. 3. stat. 1, 9 Edw. 3. St. 1, 9 Edw. 3. st. 1, 9 Ed. 3. Stat. 1, 9 Ed. 3. stat. 1, 9 Ed. 3. St. 1, 9 Ed. 3. st. 1, 9 E. 3. Stat. 1, 9 E. 3. stat. 1, 9 E. 3. St. 1 or 9 E. 3. st. 1.

- (Foreign and other merchants) c. 1 Merchant Strangers may buy and sell within this Realm without Disturbance. — repealed for England and Wales by Statute Law Revision Act 1863 (26 & 27 Vict. c. 125) and for Ireland by Statute Law (Ireland) Revision Act 1872 (35 & 36 Vict. c. 98)
- (Nonplevin) c. 2 No Man shall lose Land because of Nonplevin. — repealed for England and Wales by Statute Law Revision Act 1863 (26 & 27 Vict. c. 125) and for Ireland by Statute Law (Ireland) Revision Act 1872 (35 & 36 Vict. c. 98)
- (Process against executors) c. 3 In a Writ of Debt against divers Exectors, they shall not fourch by Essoin. — repealed by Civil Procedure Acts Repeal Act 1879 (42 & 43 Vict. c. 59)
- c. 4 Trial of a Deed dated where the King's Writ runeth not. — repealed for England and Wales by Statute Law Revision Act 1863 (26 & 27 Vict. c. 125) and for Ireland by Statute Law (Ireland) Revision Act 1872 (35 & 36 Vict. c. 98)
- c. 5 Which Justices shall send their Records and Process determined into the Exchequer. — repealed for England and Wales by Statute Law Revision Act 1863 (26 & 27 Vict. c. 125) and for Ireland by Statute Law (Ireland) Revision Act 1872 (35 & 36 Vict. c. 98)

=== 9 Edw. 3. Stat. 2 ===
The 15th Parliament of King Edward III, which met at York from 11 March 1336 until 20 March 1336.

This session was also traditionally cited as 9 Edw. 3. stat. 2, 9 Edw. 3. St. 2, 9 Edw. 3. st. 2, 9 Ed. 3. Stat. 2, 9 Ed. 3. stat. 2, 9 Ed. 3. St. 2, 9 Ed. 3. st. 2, 9 E. 3. Stat. 2, 9 E. 3. stat. 2, 9 E. 3. St. 2 or 9 E. 3. st. 2.

- Statute of Money (Money, gold, silver) cc. 1–11
  - c. 1 None shall convey Gold or Silver forth of the Realm without the King's Licence. — repealed by Coinage Offences Act 1832 (2 & 3 Will. 4. c. 34)
  - c. 2 No false Money or counterfeit Sterling shall be brought into the Realm. — repealed by Coinage Offences Act 1832 (2 & 3 Will. 4. c. 34)
  - c. 3 No Sterling Farthing or Halfpence shall be molten to make Vessel. — repealed by Coinage Offences Act 1832 (2 & 3 Will. 4. c. 34)
  - c. 4 Black Money shall be current in this Realm. — repealed by Coinage Offences Act 1832 (2 & 3 Will. 4. c. 34)
  - c. 5 The Reward of those that will sue against the Offenders of this Statute. — repealed by Coinage Offences Act 1832 (2 & 3 Will. 4. c. 34)
  - c. 6 There shall be no defrauding of this Statute. — repealed by Coinage Offences Act 1832 (2 & 3 Will. 4. c. 34)
  - c. 7 Exchanges shall be where it shall please the King and his Council. — repealed by Coinage Offences Act 1832 (2 & 3 Will. 4. c. 34)
  - c. 8 Pilgrims shall pass at Dover only. — repealed for England and Wales by Continuance, etc. of Laws Act 1623 (21 Jas. 1. c. 28) and for Ireland by Coinage Offences Act 1832 (2 & 3 Will. 4. c. 34)
  - c. 9 Search shall be made for Money carried out, and false Money brought in. — repealed by Coinage Offences Act 1832 (2 & 3 Will. 4. c. 34)
  - c. 10 The Searchers shall have the Fourth Part of the Forfeiture. — repealed by Coinage Offences Act 1832 (2 & 3 Will. 4. c. 34)
  - c. 11 Hostlers shall be sworn to search their Guests. — repealed by Coinage Offences Act 1832 (2 & 3 Will. 4. c. 34)

=== Sources ===
- Chronological Table of and Index to the Statutes. Vol. 1: To the End of the Session 59 Vict. Sess. 2 (1895) (13th ed.). London: Her Majesty's Stationery Office. 1896. p. 23 – via Google Books.
- Chronological Table of the Statutes: Covering the Period from 1235 to the End of 1971. London: Her Majesty's Stationery Office. 1972. p. 19. ISBN 978-0-11-840096-1 – via Google Books.

== 1336 (10 Edw. 3) ==
The 16th Parliament of King Edward III, which met from 3 March 1337.

This session was also traditionally cited as 10 Ed. 3 or 10 E. 3.

- (Pardons, etc.) 10 Edw. 3. Stat. 1
  - c. 1 A Confirmation of former Statutes. — repealed by Statute Law (Ireland) Revision Act 1872
  - c. 2 Pardons shall not be granted contrary to the Statute of 2 Edw. III. cap. 2. (Note: 2 Edw. 3. c. 2) — repealed for England and Wales by Statute Law Revision Act 1863 (26 & 27 Vict. c. 125) and for Ireland by Statute Law (Ireland) Revision Act 1872 (35 & 36 Vict. c. 98)
  - c. 3 He that hath a Pardon of Felony shall find Sureties for his good abearing. — repealed for England and Wales by Statute Law Revision Act 1863 (26 & 27 Vict. c. 125) and for Ireland by Statute Law (Ireland) Revision Act 1872 (35 & 36 Vict. c. 98)
- Purveyance, etc. Act 1336 10 Edw. 3. Stat. 2
  - c. 1 Things Purveyed for the King's House shall be praised, and Tallies made thereof. — repealed for England and Wales by Statute Law Revision Act 1863 (26 & 27 Vict. c. 125) and for Ireland by Statute Law (Ireland) Revision Act 1872 (35 & 36 Vict. c. 98)
  - c. 2 Of what People Enquests in the Marshals Court of the King's House shall be taken. — repealed for England and Wales by Statute Law Revision Act 1863 (26 & 27 Vict. c. 125) and for Ireland by Statute Law (Ireland) Revision Act 1872 (35 & 36 Vict. c. 98)
  - c. 3 Error in the Marshals Courts shall be reversed in the King's Bench. — repealed for England and Wales by Statute Law Revision Act 1863 (26 & 27 Vict. c. 125) and for Ireland by Statute Law (Ireland) Revision Act 1872 (35 & 36 Vict. c. 98)
  - c. 4 The Sheriff shall make Purveyance for the King's Horses. — repealed for England and Wales by Statute Law Revision Act 1863 (26 & 27 Vict. c. 125) and for Ireland by Statute Law (Ireland) Revision Act 1872 (35 & 36 Vict. c. 98)
  - c. 5 Certain Persons shall he appointed to hear the Offences of the Keepers of the King's Horses. — repealed for England and Wales by Statute Law Revision Act 1863 (26 & 27 Vict. c. 125) and for Ireland by Statute Law (Ireland) Revision Act 1872 (35 & 36 Vict. c. 98)
- Statute of Nottingham 10 Edw. 3. Stat. 3 (Sumptuary law) (Statutum de Cibariis utendis) — repealed by Repeal of Obsolete Statutes Act 1856 (19 & 20 Vict. c. 64)

=== Sources ===
- Chronological Table of and Index to the Statutes. Vol. 1: To the End of the Session 59 Vict. Sess. 2 (1895) (13th ed.). London: Her Majesty's Stationery Office. 1896. p. 23 – via Google Books.
- Chronological Table of the Statutes: Covering the Period from 1235 to the End of 1971. London: Her Majesty's Stationery Office. 1972. p. 20. ISBN 978-0-11-840096-1 – via Google Books.

== 1337 (11 Edw. 3) ==
The 17th Parliament of King Edward III, which met at Westminster from 27 September 1337.

This session was also traditionally cited as 11 Ed. 3 or 11 E. 3.

Statute made at Westminster.

- Wool Act 1337 c. 1 It shall be Felony to carry any Wool out of the Realm, until it be otherwise ordained. — repealed by Repeal of Acts Concerning Importation Act 1822 (3 Geo. 4. c. 41)
- Cloth Act 1337 c. 2 None shall wear any Cloth but such as is made in England. — repealed for England and Wales by Statute Law Revision Act 1863 (26 & 27 Vict. c. 125) and for Ireland by Statute Law (Ireland) Revision Act 1872 (35 & 36 Vict. c. 98)
- Importation Act 1337 c. 3 No Clothes made beyond the Seas shall be brought into the King's Dominions. — repealed by Repeal of Acts Concerning Importation Act 1822 (3 Geo. 4. c. 41)
- Fur Act 1337 c. 4 Who only may wear Furs. — repealed for England and Wales by Continuance, etc. of Laws Act 1603 (1 Jas. 1. c. 25) and for Ireland by Statute Law (Ireland) Revision Act 1872 (35 & 36 Vict. c. 98)
- Cloth (No. 2) Act 1337 c. 5 Cloth-workers may come into the King's Dominions, and have sufficient Liberties. — repealed for England and Wales by Statute Law Revision Act 1863 (26 & 27 Vict. c. 125) and for Ireland by Statute Law (Ireland) Revision Act 1872 (35 & 36 Vict. c. 98)

=== Sources ===
- "Anno undecimo Edwardi III". The Statutes at Large. Vol. 1 – Magna Charta to 14 Edward III – 1225 to 1340. 16 April 1762. pp. 468–470 – via Internet Archive.
- "Anno undecimo Edwardi III". The Statutes at Large. Vol. 1 – Magna Charta to 14 Edward III – 1225 to 1340. 16 April 1762. pp. 468–470 – via Google Books.
- "Anno undecimo Edwardi III". The Statutes at Large. Vol. 1 – Magna Charta to 14 Edward III – 1225 to 1340. Cambridge, Printed by J. Bentham. 16 April 1762. pp. 486–470 – via Internet Archive.
- "Anno undecimo Edwardi III". The Statutes at Large. Vol. 1 – Magna Charta to 14 Edward III – 1225 to 1340. Cambridge, Printed by J. Bentham. 16 April 1762. pp. 468–470 – via Google Books.
- Chronological Table of and Index to the Statutes. Vol. 1: To the End of the Session 59 Vict. Sess. 2 (1895) (13th ed.). London: Her Majesty's Stationery Office. 1896. p. 24 – via Google Books.
- Chronological Table of the Statutes: Covering the Period from 1235 to the End of 1971. London: Her Majesty's Stationery Office. 1972. p. 20. ISBN 978-0-11-840096-1 – via Google Books.
- "Acts of the English Parliament from 1337". legislation.gov.uk. The National Archives.

== 1340 (14 Edw. 3) ==
The 22nd Parliament of King Edward III, which met from 12 July 1340 until 26 July 1340.

This session was also traditionally cited as 14 Ed. 3 or 14 E. 3.

- 14 Edw. 3. Stat. 1
  - (Confirmation of liberties) c. 1 A Confirmation of liberties. — repealed by Statute Law (Repeals) Act 1969 (c. 52)
  - (Pardon of chattels of felons, etc.) c. 2 The King in respect of his Wars in Scotland, France, and Gascoign, &c. doth pardon several Offences. — repealed for England and Wales by Statute Law Revision Act 1863 (26 & 27 Vict. c. 125) and for Ireland by Statute Law (Ireland) Revision Act 1872 (35 & 36 Vict. c. 98)
  - (Pardon of Crown debts) c. 3 The King's Pardon to his People of divers Debts, Accompts, Arrearages, &c. until the Tenth Tear of his Reign. — repealed for England and Wales by Statute Law Revision Act 1863 (26 & 27 Vict. c. 125) and for Ireland by Statute Law (Ireland) Revision Act 1872 (35 & 36 Vict. c. 98)
  - Engleschrie Act 1340 c. 4 Presentment of Engleschrie shall be clearly extirpate. — repealed for England and Wales by Statute Law Revision Act 1863 (26 & 27 Vict. c. 125) and for Ireland by Statute Law (Ireland) Revision Act 1872 (35 & 36 Vict. c. 98)
  - (Delays in courts) c. 5 Commissioners appointed to redress Delays etc. of Courts of Justice. — repealed for England and Wales by Statute Law Revision Act 1863 (26 & 27 Vict. c. 125) and for Ireland by Statute Law (Ireland) Revision Act 1872 (35 & 36 Vict. c. 98)
  - (Amendment of records) c. 6 A Record which is defective by Misprision of a Clerk, shall be amended. — repealed for England and Wales by Statute Law Revision and Civil Procedure Act 1883 (46 & 47 Vict. c. 49) and for England and Wales and Northern Ireland by Statute Law Revision Act 1950 (14 Geo. 6. c. 6)
  - (Appointment of sheriffs) c. 7 How long a Sheriff shall tarry in his Office. — repealed by Sheriffs Act 1887 (50 & 51 Vict. c. 55)
  - (Escheators and coroners) c. 8 How many Escheators may be in the Realm, and how long they shall continue in Office. — repealed by Coroners Act 1887 (50 & 51 Vict. c. 71)
  - (Annexing hundreds to counties) c. 9 Sheriffs shall keep Hundreds in their own Hands, or let them upon the old Rent. There shall be but one Bailiff errant in one County. — repealed by Sheriffs Act 1887 (50 & 51 Vict. c. 55)
  - (Custody of gaols, etc.) c. 10 Sheriffs shall have the keeping of Gaols. A Prisoner by Duress becometh an Approver. — repealed for England and Wales by Statute Law Revision Act 1863 (26 & 27 Vict. c. 125) and for Ireland by Statute Law (Ireland) Revision Act 1872 (35 & 36 Vict. c. 98)
  - (Clerks of statutes merchant) c. 11 A Clerk of the Statutes shall have sufficient, and be resident upon his Office. — repealed for England and Wales by Statute Law Revision Act 1863 (26 & 27 Vict. c. 125) and for Ireland by Statute Law (Ireland) Revision Act 1872 (35 & 36 Vict. c. 98)
  - (Measures and weights) c. 12 Bushels and Weights shall he made and sent into every County. — repealed for England and Wales by Statute Law Revision Act 1863 (26 & 27 Vict. c. 125) and for Ireland by Statute Law (Ireland) Revision Act 1872 (35 & 36 Vict. c. 98)
  - (Tenure in capite) c. 13 Escheators shall make no Waste in the Lands of the King's Wards. A Ward shall have an Action of Waste against his Guardian. — repealed for England and Wales by Statute Law Revision Act 1863 (26 & 27 Vict. c. 125) and for Ireland by Statute Law (Ireland) Revision Act 1872 (35 & 36 Vict. c. 98)
  - (Petition for lands in King's hand) c. 14 There shall be but four Writs of Search for the King. Nothing shall hinder the Execution of Justice. — repealed by Civil Procedure Acts Repeal Act 1879 (42 & 43 Vict. c. 59)
  - (Pardon for felony) c. 15 No pardon for Felony, but where the King may do it saving his Oath. — repealed for England and Wales by Statute Law Revision Act 1863 (26 & 27 Vict. c. 125) and for Ireland by Statute Law (Ireland) Revision Act 1872 (35 & 36 Vict. c. 98)
  - (Nisi prius) c. 16 Before what Persons Nisi prius may be granted. — repealed for England and Wales by Statute Law Revision and Civil Procedure Act 1881 (44 & 45 Vict. c. 59) and for England and Wales and Northern Ireland by Statute Law Revision Act 1950 (14 Geo. 6. c. 6)
  - (Real actions) c. 17 A Juris utrum maintainable for a Parson or Vicar. — repealed for England and Wales by Statute Law Revision Act 1863 (26 & 27 Vict. c. 125) and for Ireland by Statute Law (Ireland) Revision Act 1872 (35 & 36 Vict. c. 98)
  - (Real actions) c. 18 If the Tenant will vouch to warranty a dead Man, the Demandant may aver that he is dead. — repealed for England and Wales by Statute Law Revision Act 1863 (26 & 27 Vict. c. 125) and for Ireland by Statute Law (Ireland) Revision Act 1872 (35 & 36 Vict. c. 98)
  - Purveyance Act 1340 c. 19 How Purveyors for the King's House and Wars shall make their Purveyance. — repealed for England and Wales by Statute Law Revision Act 1863 (26 & 27 Vict. c. 125) and for Ireland by Statute Law (Ireland) Revision Act 1872 (35 & 36 Vict. c. 98)
  - (Taxation) c. 20 A Subsidy granted to the King of the Ninth Lamb, the Ninth Fleece, &c. in Regard of Grants, &c. made in the Lords and Commons, and for the King's Wars. — repealed for England and Wales by Statute Law Revision Act 1863 (26 & 27 Vict. c. 125) and for Ireland by Statute Law (Ireland) Revision Act 1872 (35 & 36 Vict. c. 98)
  - (Taxation, etc.) c. 21 A Subsidy granted to the King of Wool, Wool-fells, and other Merchandise exported from Easter next until the Feast of Pentecost Twelvemonth following. — repealed for England and Wales by Statute Law Revision Act 1863 (26 & 27 Vict. c. 125) and for Ireland by Statute Law (Ireland) Revision Act 1872 (35 & 36 Vict. c. 98)
- Taxation, etc. Act 1340 14 Edw. 3. Stat. 2 — cited as 14 Edw. 3. Stats. 2 and 3 in The Statutes at Large
  - c. 1 The King's Grants that the foresaid Subsidy of the ninth Lamb, &c. shall be no Example, nor prejudicial to his Subjects : All shall be spent in his Wars. — repealed for England and Wales by Statute Law Revision Act 1863 (26 & 27 Vict. c. 125) and for Ireland by Statute Law (Ireland) Revision Act 1872 (35 & 36 Vict. c. 98)
  - c. 2 All Merchants, being no Enemies, shall come into the Realm, and depart quietly. — repealed for England and Wales by Statute Law Revision Act 1863 (26 & 27 Vict. c. 125) and for Ireland by Statute Law (Ireland) Revision Act 1872 (35 & 36 Vict. c. 98)
- (Denial of subjection of England to Kings of France) 14 Edw. 3. Stat. 3 The Realm and People of England shall not be subject to the King or Kingdom of France. — cited as 14 Edw. 3. Stat. 5 in The Statutes at Large; repealed by Statute Law Revision Act 1948 (11 & 12 Geo. 6. c. 62)
- A Statute for the Clergy (Purveyance, presentation to church and bishop's temporalities) 14 Edw. 3. Stat. 4
  - c. 1 Spiritual Persons Goods shall not be taken by Purveyances without the Owners Consent. — repealed for England and Wales by Statute Law Revision Act 1863 (26 & 27 Vict. c. 125) and for Ireland by Statute Law (Ireland) Revision Act 1872 (35 & 36 Vict. c. 98)
  - c. 2 Presentment to Churches made by the King in another's Right. — repealed for England and Wales by Statute Law Revision Act 1863 (26 & 27 Vict. c. 125) and for Ireland by Statute Law (Ireland) Revision Act 1872 (35 & 36 Vict. c. 98)
  - c. 3 No Bishops Temporalties shall be seized without good Cause. — repealed for England and Wales by Statute Law Revision Act 1863 (26 & 27 Vict. c. 125) and for Ireland by Statute Law (Ireland) Revision Act 1872 (35 & 36 Vict. c. 98)
  - c. 4 How the temporalties of Bishops shall be used in Time of Vacation. — repealed for England and Wales by Statute Law Revision Act 1863 (26 & 27 Vict. c. 125) and for Ireland by Statute Law (Ireland) Revision Act 1872 (35 & 36 Vict. c. 98)
  - c. 5 Who shall demise Bishops Temporalties during the Time of Vacation. — repealed for England and Wales by Statute Law Revision Act 1863 (26 & 27 Vict. c. 125) and for Ireland by Statute Law (Ireland) Revision Act 1872 (35 & 36 Vict. c. 98)

=== Sources ===
- "Anno decimo quarto Edwardi III". The Statutes at Large. Vol. 1 – Magna Charta to 14 Edward III – 1225 to 1340. 16 April 1762. pp. 470–500 – via Internet Archive.
- "Anno decimo quarto Edwardi III". The Statutes at Large. Vol. 1 – Magna Charta to 14 Edward III – 1225 to 1340. 16 April 1762. pp. 470–500 – via Google Books.
- "Anno decimo quarto Edwardi III". The Statutes at Large. Vol. 1 – Magna Charta to 14 Edward III – 1225 to 1340. Cambridge, Printed by J. Bentham. 16 April 1762. pp. 470–500 – via Internet Archive.
- "Anno decimo quarto Edwardi III". The Statutes at Large. Vol. 1 – Magna Charta to 14 Edward III – 1225 to 1340. Cambridge, Printed by J. Bentham. 16 April 1762. pp. 470–500 – via Google Books.
- Chronological Table of and Index to the Statutes. Vol. 1: To the End of the Session 59 Vict. Sess. 2 (1895) (13th ed.). London: Her Majesty's Stationery Office. 1896. p. 24 – via Google Books.
- Chronological Table of the Statutes: Covering the Period from 1235 to the End of 1971. London: Her Majesty's Stationery Office. 1972. p. 20. ISBN 978-0-11-840096-1 – via Google Books.
- "Acts of the English Parliament from 1337". legislation.gov.uk. The National Archives.

== 1341 (15 Edw. 3) ==
The 23rd Parliament of King Edward III, which met from 23 April 1341.

This session was also traditionally cited as 15 Ed. 3 or 15 E. 3.

- 15 Edw. 3. Stat. 1
  - c. 1 A confirmation of the great charter and former statutes. — repealed by 15 Edw. 3. Stat. 2
  - Trial of Peers Act 1341 c. 2 The peers of the realm and great officers for great offences shall be tried in parliament. — repealed by 15 Edw. 3. Stat. 2
  - c. 3 The chancellor and other great officers to swear to keep the laws. — repealed by 15 Edw. 3. Stat. 2
  - c. 4 At every parliament the King may take several great offices into his hands, and retain them four or five days. Those that attempt suits against the laws and statutes of the realm shall answer it in parliament. — repealed by 15 Edw. 3. Stat. 2
  - c. 5 Punishments of usury by the King or the ordinaries. — repealed by 15 Edw. 3. Stat. 2
  - c. 6 Ministers of the church shall not answer before the King's justices for things done touching the jurisdiction of the church. — repealed by 15 Edw. 3. Stat. 2
- 15 Edw. 3. Stat. 2
  - (Repeal of 15 Edw. 3. Stat. 1) A repeal of the said former statute. — repealed for England and Wales by Statute Law Revision Act 1863 (26 & 27 Vict. c. 125) and for Ireland by Statute Law (Ireland) Revision Act 1872 (35 & 36 Vict. c. 98)
- 15 Edw. 3. Stat. 3 An Act concerning a subsidy, &c. of wools, containing seven chapters.
  - (Subsidy) c. 1 — repealed for England and Wales by Statute Law Revision Act 1863 (26 & 27 Vict. c. 125) and for Ireland by Statute Law (Ireland) Revision Act 1872 (35 & 36 Vict. c. 98)
  - (Subsidy) c. 2 — repealed for England and Wales by Statute Law Revision Act 1863 (26 & 27 Vict. c. 125) and for Ireland by Statute Law (Ireland) Revision Act 1872 (35 & 36 Vict. c. 98)
  - (Subsidy) c. 3 — repealed for England and Wales by Statute Law Revision Act 1863 (26 & 27 Vict. c. 125) and for Ireland by Statute Law (Ireland) Revision Act 1872 (35 & 36 Vict. c. 98)
  - (Subsidy) c. 4 — repealed for England and Wales by Statute Law Revision Act 1863 (26 & 27 Vict. c. 125) and for Ireland by Statute Law (Ireland) Revision Act 1872 (35 & 36 Vict. c. 98)
  - (Subsidy) c. 5 — repealed for England and Wales by Statute Law Revision Act 1863 (26 & 27 Vict. c. 125) and for Ireland by Statute Law (Ireland) Revision Act 1872 (35 & 36 Vict. c. 98)
  - (Subsidy) c. 6 — repealed for England and Wales by Statute Law Revision Act 1863 (26 & 27 Vict. c. 125) and for Ireland by Statute Law (Ireland) Revision Act 1872 (35 & 36 Vict. c. 98)
  - (Subsidy) c. 7 — repealed for England and Wales by Statute Law Revision Act 1863 (26 & 27 Vict. c. 125) and for Ireland by Statute Law (Ireland) Revision Act 1872 (35 & 36 Vict. c. 98)

=== Sources ===
- Chronological Table of and Index to the Statutes. Vol. 1: To the End of the Session 59 Vict. Sess. 2 (1895) (13th ed.). London: Her Majesty's Stationery Office. 1896. p. 24 – via Google Books.
- Chronological Table of the Statutes: Covering the Period from 1235 to the End of 1971. London: Her Majesty's Stationery Office. 1972. p. 20. ISBN 978-0-11-840096-1 – via Google Books.

== 1343 (17 Edw. 3) ==
The 24th Parliament of King Edward III, which met from 28 April 1343 until 20 May 1343.

This session was also traditionally cited as 17 Ed. 3 or 17 E. 3.

- De Moneoi (Of Money) / An Act for the searching of money. — repealed by Coinage Offences Act 1832 (2 & 3 Will. 4. c. 34)

=== Sources ===
- Chronological Table of and Index to the Statutes. Vol. 1: To the End of the Session 59 Vict. Sess. 2 (1895) (13th ed.). London: Her Majesty's Stationery Office. 1896. p. 24 – via Google Books.
- Chronological Table of the Statutes: Covering the Period from 1235 to the End of 1971. London: Her Majesty's Stationery Office. 1972. p. 20. ISBN 978-0-11-840096-1 – via Google Books.

== 1344 (18 Edw. 3) ==
This session was also traditionally cited as 18 Ed. 3 or 18 E. 3.

=== 18 Edw. 3. Stat. 1 ===
The 25th Parliament of King Edward III, which met from 7 June 1344 until 28 June 1344.

This session was also traditionally cited as 18 Edw. stat. 1, 18 Edw. St. 1, 18 Edw. st. 1, 18 Ed. 3. Stat. 1, 18 Ed. 3. stat. 1, 18 Ed. 3. St. 1, 18 Ed. 3. st. 1, 18 E. 3. Stat. 1, 18 E. 3. stat. 1, 18 E. 3. St. 1 or 18 E. 3. st. 1.

- Declaracio facta in Parliamento tento apud Westm. anno xvij de Exigend. (Declaration made in the Parliament holden at Westminster, in the Seventeenth Year; concerning Exigends.) / A statute for the declaration of exigents. — repealed by Administration of Justice (Miscellaneous Provisions) Act 1938 (1 & 2 Geo. 6. c. 63)

=== 18 Edw. 3. Stat. 2 ===
Continuing the 25th Parliament of King Edward III, which met from 7 June 1344 until 28 June 1344.

This session was also traditionally cited as 18 Edw. stat. 2, 18 Edw. St. 2, 18 Edw. st. 2, 18 Ed. 3. Stat. 2, 18 Ed. 3. stat. 2, 18 Ed. 3. St. 2, 18 Ed. 3. st. 2, 18 E. 3. Stat. 2, 18 E. 3. stat. 2, 18 E. 3. St. 2 or 18 E. 3. st. 2.

- Taxation Act 1344 part preceding c. 1 Two quinzimes (Note: A quinzieme was a tax of one fifteenth. The dictionary definition of quinzieme at Wiktionary) granted to the King by the commonality, and two dismes by cities and boroughs, to be paid in two years, towards his wars in France and Scotland. — repealed by Statute Law Revision Act 1887 (50 & 51 Vict. c. 59)
- (Commissions of new enquiries) c. 1 Commissions of new enquiries shall cease, saving indictments of felonies, and trespasses of wools carried out without subsidies, customs, &c. — repealed for England and Wales by Statute Law Revision Act 1863 (26 & 27 Vict. c. 125) and for Ireland by Statute Law (Ireland) Revision Act 1872 (35 & 36 Vict. c. 98)
- (Justice of the Peace) c. 2 Justices of the peace shall be appointed, and their authority. — repealed by Statute Law Revision Act 1948 (11 & 12 Geo. 6. c. 62)
- (Freedom of trade) c. 3 All persons may buy wools. The sea shall be open. — repealed for England and Wales by Statute Law Revision Act 1863 (26 & 27 Vict. c. 125) and for Ireland by Statute Law (Ireland) Revision Act 1872 (35 & 36 Vict. c. 98)
- (Weights and measures) c. 4 Commissions to assay weights and measures shall be repealed, and none such granted. — repealed for England and Wales by Statute Law Revision Act 1863 (26 & 27 Vict. c. 125) and for Ireland by Statute Law (Ireland) Revision Act 1872 (35 & 36 Vict. c. 98)
- (No exigents in trespass) c. 5 No exigent (Note: An exigent was a writ in legal proceedings. The dictionary definition of exigent at Wiktionary) shall be granted in trespass, but where it is against the peace. — repealed by Administration of Justice (Miscellaneous Provisions) Act 1938 (1 & 2 Geo. 6. c. 63)
- (Currency) c. 6 Money shall be made and exchanges ordained where the King shall please. — repealed for England and Wales by Statute Law Revision Act 1863 (26 & 27 Vict. c. 125) and for Ireland by Statute Law (Ireland) Revision Act 1872 (35 & 36 Vict. c. 98)
- (Confirmation of statutes, etc.) c. 7 When the King's wages to soldiers shall begin and end. — repealed for England and Wales by Statute Law Revision Act 1863 (26 & 27 Vict. c. 125) and for Ireland by Statute Law (Ireland) Revision Act 1872 (35 & 36 Vict. c. 98)

=== 18 Edw. 3. Stat. 3 ===
Continuing the 25th Parliament of King Edward III, which met from 7 June 1344 until 28 June 1344.

This session was also traditionally cited as 18 Edw. stat. 3, 18 Edw. St. 3, 18 Edw. st. 3, 18 Ed. 3. Stat. 3, 18 Ed. 3. stat. 3, 18 Ed. 3. St. 3, 18 Ed. 3. st. 3, 18 E. 3. Stat. 3, 18 E. 3. stat. 3, 18 E. 3. St. 3 or 18 E. 3. st. 3.

- Exemption of Prelates from Secular Jurisdiction Act 1344 c. 1 A Trinennial disme granted to the King by the clergy towards the maintenance of his war in France. — repealed by Criminal Law Act 1967 (c. 58)
- (Bigamy) c. 2 Bigamy shall be tried by the ordinary, and not by inquest. — repealed for England and Wales by Offences Against the Person Act 1828 (9 Geo. 4. c. 31), for Ireland by Offences Against the Person (Ireland) Act 1829 (10 Geo. 4. c. 34) and for India by Criminal Law (India) Act 1828 (9 Geo. 4. c. 74)
- (Mortmain) c. 3 Prelates impeached for purchasing lands in Mortmain. — repealed by Mortmain and Charitable Uses Act 1888 (51 & 52 Vict. c. 42)
- (Purveyance) c. 4 In commissions to be made for purveyance, the fees of the church shall be excepted. — repealed for England and Wales by Statute Law Revision Act 1863 (26 & 27 Vict. c. 125) and for Ireland by Statute Law (Ireland) Revision Act 1872 (35 & 36 Vict. c. 98)
- (Prohibitions) c. 5 No prohibition shall be awarded but where the King hath cognisance. — repealed for England and Wales by Statute Law Revision and Civil Procedure Act 1881 (44 & 45 Vict. c. 59) and for Northern Ireland by Statute Law Revision Act 1963 (c. 30)
- (Spiritual jurisdiction) c. 6 Temporal justices shall not enquire of process awarded by spiritual judges. — repealed for England and Wales by Statute Law Revision Act 1863 (26 & 27 Vict. c. 125) and for Ireland by Statute Law (Ireland) Revision Act 1872 (35 & 36 Vict. c. 98)
- (Scire facias for tithes) c. 7 No Scire facias shall be awarded against a clerk for tithes. — repealed for England and Wales by Statute Law Revision Act 1863 (26 & 27 Vict. c. 125) and for Ireland by Statute Law (Ireland) Revision Act 1872 (35 & 36 Vict. c. 98)5

=== Sources ===
- Chronological Table of and Index to the Statutes. Vol. 1: To the End of the Session 59 Vict. Sess. 2 (1895) (13th ed.). London: Her Majesty's Stationery Office. 1896. pp. 24–25 – via Google Books.
- Chronological Table of the Statutes: Covering the Period from 1235 to the End of 1971. London: Her Majesty's Stationery Office. 1972. pp. 20–21. ISBN 978-0-11-840096-1 – via Google Books.

== 1346 (20 Edw. 3) ==
Confirmation of privileges of clergyThe 26th Parliament of King Edward III, which met from 11 September 1346 until 20 September 1346.

This session was also traditionally cited as 20 Ed. 3 or 20 E. 3.

- Ordinance for the Justices
  - Civil Procedure Act 1346 or Justices of Assize Act 1346 c. 1 The justices of both benches, assize, &c. shall do right to all men, take no fee but of the King, nor give counsel where the King is party. — repealed by Statute Law Revision and Civil Procedure Act 1881 (44 & 45 Vict. c. 59) and for Northern Ireland by Statute Law Revision Act 1950 (14 Geo. 6. c. 6)
  - (Exchequer Court) c. 2 Barons of the exchequer shall do right to all men without delay. — repealed by Statute Law Revision and Civil Procedure Act 1881 (44 & 45 Vict. c. 59) and for Northern Ireland by Statute Law Revision Act 1950 (14 Geo. 6. c. 6)
  - (Justices of Assize) c. 3 Justices of gaol-delivery, &c. and their associates, shall take an oath. — repealed by Promissory Oaths Act 1871 (34 & 35 Vict. c. 48)
  - (Maintenance and Champerty) c. 4 None shall maintain and quarrels but their own. — repealed by Statute Law Revision and Civil Procedure Act 1881 (44 & 45 Vict. c. 59) and for Northern Ireland by Statute Law Revision Act 1950 (14 Geo. 6. c. 6)
  - (Maintenance) c. 5 Lords and great men shall put those out of their services, which be maintainers of quarrels. — repealed for England and Wales by Statute Law Revision Act 1863 (26 & 27 Vict. c. 125) and for Ireland by Statute Law (Ireland) Revision Act 1872 (35 & 36 Vict. c. 98)
  - (Justices of Assize) c. 6 Justices of assize shall enquire of and punish the misdemeanour of officers and other offenders. — repealed by Statute Law Revision and Civil Procedure Act 1881 (44 & 45 Vict. c. 59) and for Northern Ireland by Statute Law Revision Act 1950 (14 Geo. 6. c. 6)
- (Oath of the justices) 18 Edw. 3 Stat. 4 — cited as 18 Edw. 3. Stat. 4 in The Statutes at Large — repealed by Promissory Oaths Act 1871 (34 & 35 Vict. c. 48)
- Chancery Oath Act 1346 or Oath of the Clerks of Chancery Act 134618 Edw. 3 Stat. 5 — cited as 18 Edw. 3. Stat. 5 in The Statutes at Large — repealed by Promissory Oaths Act 1871 (34 & 35 Vict. c. 48)

=== Sources ===
- Chronological Table of and Index to the Statutes. Vol. 1: To the End of the Session 59 Vict. Sess. 2 (1895) (13th ed.). London: Her Majesty's Stationery Office. 1896. p. 25 – via Google Books.
- Chronological Table of the Statutes: Covering the Period from 1235 to the End of 1971. London: Her Majesty's Stationery Office. 1972. p. 21. ISBN 978-0-11-840096-1 – via Google Books.

== 1349 (23 Edw. 3) ==
This session was also traditionally cited as 23 Ed. 3 or 23 E. 3.

Ordinance of Labourers 1349

- c. 1 Every person able in body under the age of sixty years, not having to live on, being required, shall be bound to serve him that doth require him, or else be committed to the gaol, until he find surety to serve. — repealed for England and Wales by Statute Law Revision Act 1863 (26 & 27 Vict. c. 125) and for Ireland by Statute Law (Ireland) Revision Act 1872 (35 & 36 Vict. c. 98)
- c. 2 If a workman or servant depart from service before the time agreed upon, he shall be imprisoned. — repealed for England and Wales by Statute Law Revision Act 1863 (26 & 27 Vict. c. 125) and for Ireland by Statute Law (Ireland) Revision Act 1872 (35 & 36 Vict. c. 98)
- c. 3 The old wages, and no more, shall be given to servants. — repealed for England and Wales by Statute Law Revision Act 1863 (26 & 27 Vict. c. 125) and for Ireland by Statute Law (Ireland) Revision Act 1872 (35 & 36 Vict. c. 98)
- c. 4 If the lord of a town or manor do offend against the statute in any point, he shall forfeit the treble value. — repealed for England and Wales by Statute Law Revision Act 1863 (26 & 27 Vict. c. 125) and for Ireland by Statute Law (Ireland) Revision Act 1872 (35 & 36 Vict. c. 98)
- c. 5 If any artificer or workman take more wages than were wont to be paid, he shall be committed to the gaol. — repealed for England and Wales by Statute Law Revision Act 1863 (26 & 27 Vict. c. 125) and for Ireland by Statute Law (Ireland) Revision Act 1872 (35 & 36 Vict. c. 98)
- c. 6 Victuals shall be sold at reasonable prices. — repealed for England and Wales by Statute Law Revision Act 1863 (26 & 27 Vict. c. 125) and for Ireland by Statute Law (Ireland) Revision Act 1872 (35 & 36 Vict. c. 98)
- c. 7 No person shall give any thing to a beggar that is able to labour. — repealed for England and Wales by Continuance, etc. of Laws Act 1623 (21 Jas. 1. c. 28) and for Ireland by Statute Law (Ireland) Revision Act 1872 (35 & 36 Vict. c. 98)
- Labourers Artificers, etc. Act 1349 c. 8 He that taketh more wages than is accustomably given, shall pay the surplusage to the town where he dwelleth, towards a payment to the King of a tenth and fifteenth granted to him. — repealed for England and Wales by Statute Law Revision Act 1863 (26 & 27 Vict. c. 125) and for Ireland by Statute Law (Ireland) Revision Act 1872 (35 & 36 Vict. c. 98)

=== Sources ===
- Chronological Table of and Index to the Statutes. Vol. 1: To the End of the Session 59 Vict. Sess. 2 (1895) (13th ed.). London: Her Majesty's Stationery Office. 1896. p. 25 – via Google Books.
- Chronological Table of the Statutes: Covering the Period from 1235 to the End of 1971. London: Her Majesty's Stationery Office. 1972. p. 21. ISBN 978-0-11-840096-1 – via Google Books.

== 1350 (25 Edw. 3) ==
The 29th Parliament of King Edward III, which met from 9 February 1351 until 1 March 1351.

This session was also traditionally cited as 25 Ed. 3 or 25 E. 3.

- Status of Children Born Abroad Act 1350 or De natis ultra mare 25 Edw. 3. Stat. 1 In what place bastardy pleaded against him that is born out of the realm shall be tried. — cited as 25 Edw. 3. Stat. 2 in The Statutes at Large;
  still in force
- Statute of Labourers 1351 (Labourers, artificers, etc.) 25 Edw. 3. Stat. 2 — cited as 25 Edw. 3. Stat. 1 in The Statutes at Large
  - c. 1 The year and day's wages of servants and labourers in husbandry. — repealed for England and Wales by Statute Law Revision Act 1863 (26 & 27 Vict. c. 125) and for Ireland by Statute Law (Ireland) Revision Act 1872 (35 & 36 Vict. c. 98)
  - c. 2 How much shall be given for threshing all sorts of corn by the quarter. None shall depart from the town in summer where he dwelt in winter. — repealed for England and Wales by Statute Law Revision Act 1863 (26 & 27 Vict. c. 125) and for Ireland by Statute Law (Ireland) Revision Act 1872 (35 & 36 Vict. c. 98)
  - c. 3 The wages of several sorts of artificers and labourers. — repealed for England and Wales by Statute Law Revision Act 1863 (26 & 27 Vict. c. 125) and for Ireland by Statute Law (Ireland) Revision Act 1872 (35 & 36 Vict. c. 98)
  - c. 4 Shoes, &c. shall he sold as in the 20th year of King Edward the 3d. Artificers sworn to use their crafts as they did in the 20th year of the same King. — repealed for England and Wales by Statute Law Revision Act 1863 (26 & 27 Vict. c. 125) and for Ireland by Statute Law (Ireland) Revision Act 1872 (35 & 36 Vict. c. 98)
  - c. 5 The several punishments of persons offending against this statute. — repealed for England and Wales by Statute Law Revision Act 1863 (26 & 27 Vict. c. 125) and for Ireland by Statute Law (Ireland) Revision Act 1872 (35 & 36 Vict. c. 98)
  - c. 6 Sheriffs, constables, bailiffs, gaolers, nor other officers, shall exact any thing of the same servants. The forfeitures of servants shall be employed to the aid of dismes and quinzimes granted to the King by the commons. — repealed for England and Wales by Statute Law Revision Act 1863 (26 & 27 Vict. c. 125) and for Ireland by Statute Law (Ireland) Revision Act 1872 (35 & 36 Vict. c. 98)
  - c. 7 The justices shall hold their sessions four times a year, and at all times needful. Servants which flee from one country to another shall be committed to prison. — repealed for England and Wales by Statute Law Revision Act 1863 (26 & 27 Vict. c. 125) and for Ireland by Statute Law (Ireland) Revision Act 1872 (35 & 36 Vict. c. 98)
- (Aulneger, foreign and other merchants, forestalling, weirs) 25 Edw. 3. Stat. 3 — cited as 25 Edw. 3. Stat. 4 in The Statutes at Large
  - c. 1 The aulneger (Note: Alnagers were inspectors of woollen cloth. The dictionary definition of alnager at Wiktionary) shall be sworn to do his duty. The penalty if he offend. — repealed for England and Wales by Statute Law Revision Act 1863 (26 & 27 Vict. c. 125) and for Ireland by Statute Law (Ireland) Revision Act 1872 (35 & 36 Vict. c. 98)
  - c. 2 Merchants strangers may buy and sell without disturbance. — repealed for England and Wales by Statute Law Revision Act 1863 (26 & 27 Vict. c. 125) and for Ireland by Statute Law (Ireland) Revision Act 1872 (35 & 36 Vict. c. 98)
  - c. 3 The penalty of him that doth forestal (Note: Forestall in the meaning of trying to monopolise supply of an item to be able to sell for an increased price. The dictionary definition of forestall at Wiktionary) wares, merchandise, or victual. — repealed by Forestalling, Regrating, etc. Act 1844 (7 & 8 Vict. c. 24)
  - c. 4 New wears (Note: 'Wear' meaning weir.) shall be pulled down, and not repaired. — repealed for England and Wales by Salmon Fishery Act 1861 (24 & 25 Vict. c. 109) and for Ireland by Statute Law (Ireland) Revision Act 1872 (35 & 36 Vict. c. 98)
- De provisoribus (Statute of Provisors of Benefices) 25 Edw. 3. Stat. 4 The King and other lords shall present unto benefices of their own, or their ancestors foundation, and not the bishop of Rome. 25 Edw. 3. Stat. 6 — cited as 25 Edw. 3. Stat. 6 in The Statutes at Large; repealed by Statute Law Revision Act 1948 (11 & 12 Geo. 6. c. 62)

=== Sources ===
- Chronological Table of and Index to the Statutes. Vol. 1: To the End of the Session 59 Vict. Sess. 2 (1895) (13th ed.). London: Her Majesty's Stationery Office. 1896. p. 25 – via Google Books.
- Chronological Table of the Statutes: Covering the Period from 1235 to the End of 1971. London: Her Majesty's Stationery Office. 1972. p. 21. ISBN 978-0-11-840096-1 – via Google Books.
- "Acts of the English Parliament from 1350". legislation.gov.uk. The National Archives.

== 1351 (25 Edw. 3) ==
The 30th Parliament of King Edward III, which met from 13 January 1352 until 11 February 1352.

This session was also traditionally cited as 25 Ed. 3 or 25 E. 3.

25 Edw. 3. Stat. 5 — cited as a Statute of Purveyors, 25 Edw. 3. Stat. 3 in The Statutes at Large

- (Purveyance) c. 1 By what measures the King's purveyors shall take corn. Things purveyed shall be praised, and tallies made thereof. — repealed for England and Wales by Statute Law Revision Act 1863 (26 & 27 Vict. c. 125) and for Ireland by Statute Law (Ireland) Revision Act 1872 (35 & 36 Vict. c. 98)
- Treason Act 1351 c. 2 A declaration which offences shall be adjudged treason. —
  still in force
- (Challenge of jurors) c. 3 No indicator shall be put upon the inquest of the party indicted. — repealed by Statute Law Revision Act 1948 (11 & 12 Geo. 6. c. 62)
- Criminal and Civil Justice Act 1351 c. 4 None shall be condemned upon suggestion without lawful presentment. —
  still in force
- (Executors of executors) c. 5 Executors of executors shall have the benefit and charge of the first testator. — repealed for England and Wales by Administration of Estates Act 1925 (15 & 16 Geo. 5. c. 23) and for Northern Ireland by Administration of Estates (Northern Ireland) Order 1979 (SI 1979/1575)
- (Purveyance) c. 6 A purveyor shall not take timber in or about any persons house. — repealed for England and Wales by Statute Law Revision Act 1863 (26 & 27 Vict. c. 125) and for Ireland by Statute Law (Ireland) Revision Act 1872 (35 & 36 Vict. c. 98)
- (Exactions by keepers of forests, etc.) c. 7 Keepers of a forest or chase shall gather nothing without the owner's good will. — repealed by Wild Creatures and Forest Laws Act 1971 (c. 47)
- (Finding of men at arms) c. 8 None shall be bound to find men of arms, but by tenure, or grant by parliament. — repealed for England and Wales by Statute Law Revision Act 1863 (26 & 27 Vict. c. 125) and for Ireland by Statute Law (Ireland) Revision Act 1872 (35 & 36 Vict. c. 98)
- (Weights) c. 9 Auncel weight shall be put out, and weighing shall be by equal balance. — repealed for England and Wales by Statute Law Revision Act 1863 (26 & 27 Vict. c. 125) and for Ireland by Statute Law (Ireland) Revision Act 1872 (35 & 36 Vict. c. 98)
- (Measures) c. 10 Every measure shall be according to the King's standard; and shall be striked without heap; saving the rents of lords. — repealed for England and Wales by Statute Law Revision Act 1863 (26 & 27 Vict. c. 125) and for Ireland by Statute Law (Ireland) Revision Act 1872 (35 & 36 Vict. c. 98)
- (Aids) c. 11 Aid to make the King's son knight, or to marry his daughter. — repealed for England and Wales by Statute Law Revision Act 1863 (26 & 27 Vict. c. 125) and for Ireland by Statute Law (Ireland) Revision Act 1872 (35 & 36 Vict. c. 98)
- (Exchange of gold and silver) c. 12 No person shall take profit by exchange of gold or silver. — repealed for England and Wales by Statute Law Revision Act 1863 (26 & 27 Vict. c. 125) and for Ireland by Statute Law (Ireland) Revision Act 1872 (35 & 36 Vict. c. 98)
- (Gold and silver coin) c. 13 The money of gold or silver now current shall not be impaired. — repealed for England and Wales by Statute Law Revision Act 1863 (26 & 27 Vict. c. 125) and for Ireland by Statute Law (Ireland) Revision Act 1872 (35 & 36 Vict. c. 98)
- (Process against persons indicted of felony) c. 14 What process shall be awarded against him that is indicted of felony. — repealed by Administration of Justice (Miscellaneous Provisions) Act 1938 (1 & 2 Geo. 6. c. 63)
- (Purveyance) c. 15 The penalty of a purveyor taking more sheep than be needful. — repealed for England and Wales by Statute Law Revision Act 1863 (26 & 27 Vict. c. 125) and for Ireland by Statute Law (Ireland) Revision Act 1872 (35 & 36 Vict. c. 98)
- (Real actions) c. 16 The exception of nontenure of parcel shall not abate the whole writ. — repealed for England and Wales by Statute Law Revision Act 1863 (26 & 27 Vict. c. 125) and for Ireland by Statute Law (Ireland) Revision Act 1872 (35 & 36 Vict. c. 98)
- Process of Exigent Act 1351 c. 17 Process of exigent shall be awarded in debt, detinue, and replevin. — repealed by Bankruptcy Repeal and Insolvent Court Act 1869 (32 & 33 Vict. c. 83)
- (Villainage) c. 18 Villenage may be pleaded, and a villein seised, though a Libertate probanda be depending. — repealed for England and Wales by Statute Law Revision Act 1863 (26 & 27 Vict. c. 125) and for Ireland by Statute Law (Ireland) Revision Act 1872 (35 & 36 Vict. c. 98)
- (Crown debtors) c. 19 By the King's protection the parties suit shall not be hindred, but his execution. — repealed for England and Wales by Statute Law Revision Act 1863 (26 & 27 Vict. c. 125) and for Ireland by Statute Law (Ireland) Revision Act 1872 (35 & 36 Vict. c. 98)
- (Coinage) c. 20 Plate of gold and silver shall be received into the King's mint by weight, and not by number; and so shall the money be returned. — repealed for England and Wales by Statute Law Revision Act 1863 (26 & 27 Vict. c. 125) and for Ireland by Statute Law (Ireland) Revision Act 1872 (35 & 36 Vict. c. 98)
- (Purveyance) c. 21 The king's butlers shall purvey no more wine than shall be appointed. — repealed for England and Wales by Statute Law Revision Act 1863 (26 & 27 Vict. c. 125) and for Ireland by Statute Law (Ireland) Revision Act 1872 (35 & 36 Vict. c. 98)
- (Provisors) c. 22 He that purchaseth a provision in Rome for an abbey, shall be out of the King's protection, and any man may do with him as with the King's enemy. — repealed by Repeal of Obsolete Statutes Act 1856 (19 & 20 Vict. c. 64)
- (Lombards) c. 23 The debt of a Lombard unpaid shall be satisfied by his company. — repealed for England and Wales by Statute Law Revision Act 1863 (26 & 27 Vict. c. 125) and for Ireland by Statute Law (Ireland) Revision Act 1872 (35 & 36 Vict. c. 98)

An Ordinance for the Clergy 25 Edw. 3. Stat. 6

- (Confirmation of privileges of clergy) c. 1 All privileges granted to the clergy confirmed. The King nor his heirs shall present to a benefice of another's right of any time of his progenitors. — repealed for Northern Ireland by Statute Law Revision Act 1950 (14 Geo. 6. c. 6) and for England and Wales by Statute Law (Repeals) Act 1969 (c. 52)
- (Repeal of 14 Edw. 3. Stat. 4. c. 2) c. 2 A repeal of the statute of Anno 14 Ed. 3. stat. 4. cap. 2, (Note: A Statute for the Clergy (14 Edw. 3. Stat. 4. c. 2)) touching the King's presentment to a church of another's right. — repealed for England and Wales by Statute Law Revision Act 1863 (26 & 27 Vict. c. 125) and for Ireland by Statute Law (Ireland) Revision Act 1872 (35 & 36 Vict. c. 98)
- (Presentation to benefices by the King) c. 3 When the King presenteth to a benefice in another's right, his title shall be examined. — repealed for Northern Ireland by Statute Law Revision Act 1950 (14 Geo. 6. c. 6) and for England and Wales by Statute Law (Repeals) Act 1969 (c. 52)
- (Benefit of clergy) c. 4 All clerks convicted of felony or treason shall be delivered to their ordinaries. — repealed for England and Wales by Criminal Statutes Repeal Act 1827 (7 & 8 Geo. 4. c. 27), for Ireland by Criminal Statutes (Ireland) Repeal Act 1828 (9 Geo. 4. c. 53) and for India by Criminal Law (India) Act 1828 (9 Geo. 4. c. 74)
- (Benefit of clergy) c. 5 A clerk shall be arrainged of all his offences at once. — repealed for England and Wales by Criminal Statutes Repeal Act 1827 (7 & 8 Geo. 4. c. 27), for Ireland by Criminal Statutes (Ireland) Repeal Act 1828 (9 Geo. 4. c. 53) and for India by Criminal Law (India) Act 1828 (9 Geo. 4. c. 74)
- (Temporalities of prelates) c. 6 A bishop's temporalities shall not be seised for a contempt. — repealed for England and Wales by Statute Law Revision Act 1863 (26 & 27 Vict. c. 125) and for Ireland by Statute Law (Ireland) Revision Act 1872 (35 & 36 Vict. c. 98)
- King's Title to Benefice Act 1351 c. 7 The ordinary may counterplead the King's title for a benefice fallen by lapse. — repealed for Northern Ireland by Statute Law Revision Act 1950 (14 Geo. 6. c. 6) and for England and Wales by Statute Law (Repeals) Act 1969 (c. 52)
- (Cognizance of avoidance of benefices) c. 8 Cognisance of avoidance of benefices appertained to the ecclesiastical judge. — repealed for Northern Ireland by Statute Law Revision Act 1950 (14 Geo. 6. c. 6) and for England and Wales by Ecclesiastical Jurisdiction Measure 1963 (No. 1)
- (Indictments of ordinaries for extortion) c. 9 Indictments of ordinaries for extortion shall be put in certainty. — repealed by Statute Law Revision Act 1887 (50 & 51 Vict. c. 59)

Statutum de Forma levationis Decime-quinte (Statute of the Form of levying of the Fifteenth) 25 Edw. 3. Stat. 7 The King granteth to the commons in aid of a disme and fifteen by them before granted to him, all the issues, fines, forfeitures, and amerciaments levied of labourers, artificers, regrators, victuallers, and servants. — repealed for England and Wales by Statute Law Revision Act 1863 (26 & 27 Vict. c. 125) and for Ireland by Statute Law (Ireland) Revision Act 1872 (35 & 36 Vict. c. 98)

Artic. p. Clero. resp. (This Article for the Clergy is respited until the next Parliament) — cited as 25 Edw. 3. Stat. 3 in The Statutes at Large; repealed for England and Wales by Statute Law Revision Act 1863 (26 & 27 Vict. c. 125) and for Ireland by Statute Law (Ireland) Revision Act 1872 (35 & 36 Vict. c. 98)

=== Sources ===
- Chronological Table of and Index to the Statutes. Vol. 1: To the End of the Session 59 Vict. Sess. 2 (1895) (13th ed.). London: Her Majesty's Stationery Office. 1896. pp. 25–26 – via Google Books.
- Chronological Table of the Statutes: Covering the Period from 1235 to the End of 1971. London: Her Majesty's Stationery Office. 1972. p. 21. ISBN 978-0-11-840096-1 – via Google Books.
- "Acts of the English Parliament from 1351". legislation.gov.uk. The National Archives.

== 1353 (27 Edw. 3) ==
This session was also traditionally cited as 27 Ed. 3 or 27 E. 3.

- A Statute against Anullers of Judgments of the King's Court 27 Edw. 3. Stat. 1
  - (Suing in foreign court) c. 1 Praemunire for suing in a foreign realm, or impeaching of judgement given. — repealed by Civil Procedure Acts Repeal Act 1879 (42 & 43 Vict. c. 59)
  - (Pardon) c. 2 In a pardon of felony the suggestions and suggestor's name shall be comprised. — repealed by Statute Law Revision Act 1948 (11 & 12 Geo. 6. c. 62)
  - (Regrators) c. 3 Commissions shall be granted to enquire of offenders contrary to the statute of 23 Edward III. c. 6. (Note: 23 Edw. 3. c. 6) — repealed by Forestalling, Regrating, etc. Act 1844 (7 & 8 Vict. c. 24)
  - (Cloths) c. 4 The aulnegers fees for every cloth fold. Cloths shall be sealed before they be put to sale. A subsidy granted to the King of every cloth sold. — repealed for England and Wales by Statute Law Revision Act 1863 (26 & 27 Vict. c. 125) and for Ireland by Statute Law (Ireland) Revision Act 1872 (35 & 36 Vict. c. 98)
  - (Forestallers) c. 5 It shall be felony to forestal or ingross Gascoin wine. — repealed by Repeal of Acts Concerning Importation Act 1822 (3 Geo. 4. c. 41)
  - (Importation of wine) c. 6 Merchants may bring their wines to what ports they will. — repealed for England and Wales by Statute Law Revision Act 1863 (26 & 27 Vict. c. 125) and for Ireland by Statute Law (Ireland) Revision Act 1872 (35 & 36 Vict. c. 98)
  - (Buying of wines) c. 7 When and where Gascoin wines may be bought. — repealed by Repeal of Acts Concerning Importation Act 1822 (3 Geo. 4. c. 41)
  - (Gauging of wines) c. 8 Red and white wine shall be gauged; and the punishment of him that hindreth it. — repealed by Repeal of Acts Concerning Importation Act 1822 (3 Geo. 4. c. 41)
- Ordinance of the Staples 1353 27 Edw. 3. Stat. 2
  - c. 1 Where the staple for England, Wales and Ireland shall be kept. Whither merchandises of the staple shall be carried, and what custom shall be paid for them. — repealed for England and Wales by Statute Law Revision Act 1863 (26 & 27 Vict. c. 125) and for Ireland by Statute Law (Ireland) Revision Act 1872 (35 & 36 Vict. c. 98)
  - c. 2 Merchants strangers may come into, and depart forth of the realm with their goods, and none of them shall be taken by the King's purveyors. — repealed for England and Wales by Statute Law Revision Act 1863 (26 & 27 Vict. c. 125) and for Ireland by Statute Law (Ireland) Revision Act 1872 (35 & 36 Vict. c. 98)
  - c. 3 All persons may buy wools, fells, &c. so that they bring them to the staple. It shall be felony for an English, Welsh, or Irish merchant to transport wool, &c. — repealed for England and Wales by Statute Law Revision Act 1863 (26 & 27 Vict. c. 125) and for Ireland by Statute Law (Ireland) Revision Act 1872 (35 & 36 Vict. c. 98)
  - c. 4 None going unto, or returning from the staple, shall be disturbed by purveyors. — repealed for England and Wales by Statute Law Revision Act 1863 (26 & 27 Vict. c. 125) and for Ireland by Statute Law (Ireland) Revision Act 1872 (35 & 36 Vict. c. 98)
  - c. 5 None of the King's justices shall take cognisance of things belonging to the staple. — repealed for England and Wales by Statute Law Revision Act 1863 (26 & 27 Vict. c. 125) and for Ireland by Statute Law (Ireland) Revision Act 1872 (35 & 36 Vict. c. 98)
  - c. 6 None of the King's officers shall meddle where the staples be. — repealed for England and Wales by Statute Law Revision Act 1863 (26 & 27 Vict. c. 125) and for Ireland by Statute Law (Ireland) Revision Act 1872 (35 & 36 Vict. c. 98)
  - c. 7 Licences granted to carry merchandises forth of the realm shall be void. — repealed for England and Wales by Statute Law Revision Act 1863 (26 & 27 Vict. c. 125) and for Ireland by Statute Law (Ireland) Revision Act 1872 (35 & 36 Vict. c. 98)
  - c. 8 The jurisdiction of the mayor and constables of the staple. All people of the staple shall be ruled by the law-merchant, and not by the common law. — repealed for England and Wales by Statute Law Revision Act 1863 (26 & 27 Vict. c. 125) and for Ireland by Statute Law (Ireland) Revision Act 1872 (35 & 36 Vict. c. 98)
  - c. 9 The effect of a recognisance knowledged in the staple for recovery of a debt. — repealed for England and Wales by Statute Law Revision Act 1863 (26 & 27 Vict. c. 125) and for Ireland by Statute Law (Ireland) Revision Act 1872 (35 & 36 Vict. c. 98)
  - c. 10 There shall be but one weight, measure and yard through the realm. — repealed for England and Wales by Statute Law Revision Act 1863 (26 & 27 Vict. c. 125) and for Ireland by Statute Law (Ireland) Revision Act 1872 (35 & 36 Vict. c. 98)
  - c. 11 The penalty for forestalling of merchandises before they come to the staple. — repealed for England and Wales by Statute Law Revision Act 1863 (26 & 27 Vict. c. 125) and for Ireland by Statute Law (Ireland) Revision Act 1872 (35 & 36 Vict. c. 98)
  - c. 12 The penalty of selling wool, &c. to a Scottishman to be carried into Scotland. — repealed for England and Wales by Statute Law Revision Act 1863 (26 & 27 Vict. c. 125) and for Ireland by Statute Law (Ireland) Revision Act 1872 (35 & 36 Vict. c. 98)
  - c. 13 A remedy where a merchant's goods be robbed or perished on the sea. — repealed for England and Wales by Statute Law Revision Act 1863 (26 & 27 Vict. c. 125) and for Ireland by Statute Law (Ireland) Revision Act 1872 (35 & 36 Vict. c. 98)
  - c. 14 Merchants may bring in gold or silver to the King's exchanges, and carry out as much. — repealed for England and Wales by Statute Law Revision Act 1863 (26 & 27 Vict. c. 125) and for Ireland by Statute Law (Ireland) Revision Act 1872 (35 & 36 Vict. c. 98)
  - c. 15 Indentures shall be made between carriers of wool by the water, and the bailiffs of towns where they load them; which carriers shall be sworn and bound to carry them to the staple. — repealed for England and Wales by Statute Law Revision Act 1863 (26 & 27 Vict. c. 125) and for Ireland by Statute Law (Ireland) Revision Act 1872 (35 & 36 Vict. c. 98)
  - c. 16 Houses shall be set for reasonable rents in staple-towns, imposed by the mayor, &c. — repealed for England and Wales by Statute Law Revision Act 1863 (26 & 27 Vict. c. 125) and for Ireland by Statute Law (Ireland) Revision Act 1872 (35 & 36 Vict. c. 98)
  - c. 17 A merchant stranger not be impeached for another's debt but upon good cause. Merchants of enemies countries shall sell their goods in convenient time, and depart. — repealed for England and Wales by Statute Law Revision Act 1863 (26 & 27 Vict. c. 125) and for Ireland by Statute Law (Ireland) Revision Act 1872 (35 & 36 Vict. c. 98)
  - c. 18 Merchants of Ireland or Wales may bring their merchandises to the staples of England. — repealed for England and Wales by Statute Law Revision Act 1863 (26 & 27 Vict. c. 125) and for Ireland by Statute Law (Ireland) Revision Act 1872 (35 & 36 Vict. c. 98)
  - c. 19 None shall lose his goods by his servants offence. Speedy justice shall be done from day to day, and from hour to hour. — repealed for England and Wales by Statute Law Revision Act 1863 (26 & 27 Vict. c. 125) and for Ireland by Statute Law (Ireland) Revision Act 1872 (35 & 36 Vict. c. 98)
  - c. 20 Merchants strangers taken in the King's protection; and for their wrongs shall recover double damages. — repealed for England and Wales by Statute Law Revision Act 1863 (26 & 27 Vict. c. 125) and for Ireland by Statute Law (Ireland) Revision Act 1872 (35 & 36 Vict. c. 98)
  - c. 21 A mayor and two constables shall be chosen yearly in every staple-town: and their authority. — repealed for England and Wales by Statute Law Revision Act 1863 (26 & 27 Vict. c. 125) and for Ireland by Statute Law (Ireland) Revision Act 1872 (35 & 36 Vict. c. 98)
  - c. 22 Correctors shall be appointed in the staple-towns to make and record bargains. — repealed for England and Wales by Statute Law Revision Act 1863 (26 & 27 Vict. c. 125) and for Ireland by Statute Law (Ireland) Revision Act 1872 (35 & 36 Vict. c. 98)
  - c. 23 The officers of the staple, and merchants repairing to, shall be sworn to maintain the staple, and the laws and customs of it. — repealed for England and Wales by Statute Law Revision Act 1863 (26 & 27 Vict. c. 125) and for Ireland by Statute Law (Ireland) Revision Act 1872 (35 & 36 Vict. c. 98)
  - c. 24 Two merchants aliens shall be chosen to be associate in judgment to the mayor and constables. And six mediators of questions between buyers and sellers shall be chosen. — repealed for England and Wales by Statute Law Revision Act 1863 (26 & 27 Vict. c. 125) and for Ireland by Statute Law (Ireland) Revision Act 1872 (35 & 36 Vict. c. 98)
  - c. 25 It shall be felony to make any conspiracy which may return to the disturbance of the staple. — repealed for England and Wales by Statute Law Revision Act 1863 (26 & 27 Vict. c. 125) and for Ireland by Statute Law (Ireland) Revision Act 1872 (35 & 36 Vict. c. 98)
  - c. 26 Credit shall be given to letters, or the merchants oaths, of the value of their goods. — repealed for England and Wales by Statute Law Revision Act 1863 (26 & 27 Vict. c. 125) and for Ireland by Statute Law (Ireland) Revision Act 1872 (35 & 36 Vict. c. 98)
  - c. 27 The forfeiture of those which before this statute have transported their wools, &c. — repealed for England and Wales by Statute Law Revision Act 1863 (26 & 27 Vict. c. 125) and for Ireland by Statute Law (Ireland) Revision Act 1872 (35 & 36 Vict. c. 98)
  - c. 28 The liberties of the staple confirmed, notwithstanding the franchises of others; but in fairs, markets, hundreds, leets, &c. — repealed for England and Wales by Statute Law Revision Act 1863 (26 & 27 Vict. c. 125) and for Ireland by Statute Law (Ireland) Revision Act 1872 (35 & 36 Vict. c. 98)
- Ordin. de feodis Majorum (Fees of mayors, etc. of staples) The ordinance of the several fees of the mayors and constables of the staple, in every city and town where the staple is ordained to be kept, and by what means the same shall be levied. — repealed by Repeal of Acts Concerning Importation Act 1822 (3 Geo. 4. c. 41)

=== Sources ===
- Chronological Table of and Index to the Statutes. Vol. 1: To the End of the Session 59 Vict. Sess. 2 (1895) (13th ed.). London: Her Majesty's Stationery Office. 1896. p. 26 – via Google Books.
- Chronological Table of the Statutes: Covering the Period from 1235 to the End of 1971. London: Her Majesty's Stationery Office. 1972. p. 22. ISBN 978-0-11-840096-1 – via Google Books.

== 1354 (28 Edw. 3) ==
This session was also traditionally cited as 28 Ed. 3 or 28 E. 3.

- (Confirmation of charters, etc.) c. 1 A confirmation of all statutes before made and used. — repealed for England and Wales by Statute Law Revision Act 1863 (26 & 27 Vict. c. 125) and for Ireland by Statute Law (Ireland) Revision Act 1872 (35 & 36 Vict. c. 98)
- (Lords of Marches of Wales) c. 2 Lords of the marches of Wales shall be attendant to the crown of England, and not to the principality of Wales. — repealed by Statute Law Revision Act 1887 (50 & 51 Vict. c. 59)
- Liberty of Subject Act 1354 or Due Process of Law Act 1354 c. 3 No person shall be condemned without his answer. —
  still in force
- (Tenure in capite) c. 4 Now the King shall be answered the mense rates of lands coming to him by his tenant's death. — repealed for England and Wales by Statute Law Revision Act 1863 (26 & 27 Vict. c. 125) and for Ireland by Statute Law (Ireland) Revision Act 1872 (35 & 36 Vict. c. 98)
- (Exportation of iron) c. 5 No iron shall he carried forth of the realm. — repealed for England and Wales by Statute Law Revision Act 1863 (26 & 27 Vict. c. 125) and for Ireland by Statute Law (Ireland) Revision Act 1872 (35 & 36 Vict. c. 98)
- Election of Coroners Act 1354 c. 6 Who shall he coroners, and by whom and where they shall be chosen. — repealed by Coroners Act 1887 (50 & 51 Vict. c. 71)
- (Sheriffs) c. 7 No sheriff shall continue in his office above one year. — repealed by Sheriffs Act 1887 (50 & 51 Vict. c. 55)
- (Attaint) c. 8 An attaint shall be granted as well upon a bill as upon a writ of trespass. — repealed for England and Wales by Statute Law Revision Act 1863 (26 & 27 Vict. c. 125) and for Ireland by Statute Law (Ireland) Revision Act 1872 (35 & 36 Vict. c. 98)
- (Sheriffs) c. 9 No writ shall be directed to a sheriff to charge an inquest to indict any. — repealed by Sheriffs Act 1887 (50 & 51 Vict. c. 55)
- (Misprisions in cities and boroughs) c. 10 The penalty of the mayor, sheriffs, &c. of London, if they do not redress errors and misprisions there; and in what counties the trial thereof shall be. — repealed by Repeal of Obsolete Statutes Act 1856 (19 & 20 Vict. c. 64)
- (Confirmation, etc. of 13 Edw. 1 Stat. Wynton. cc. 1, 2) c. 11 Fresh suit and hue and cry shall be made after robbers from country to country. — repealed for India by Criminal Law (India) Act 1828 (9 Geo. 4. c. 74), for England and Wales by Statute Law Revision Act 1863 (26 & 27 Vict. c. 125) and for Ireland by Statute Law (Ireland) Revision Act 1872 (35 & 36 Vict. c. 98)
- (Purveyance) c. 12 Within what time purveyances made for the King's house shall be paid for. — repealed for England and Wales by Statute Law Revision Act 1863 (26 & 27 Vict. c. 125) and for Ireland by Statute Law (Ireland) Revision Act 1872 (35 & 36 Vict. c. 98)
- Confirmation, etc., of 27 Ed. 3. St. 2 Act 1354 c. 13 The warranty of packing of wool shall he put out. An inquest shall be de Medietate Linguae, where an alien is party. — repealed for England and Wales by Statute Law Revision Act 1863 (26 & 27 Vict. c. 125) and for Ireland by Statute Law (Ireland) Revision Act 1872 (35 & 36 Vict. c. 98)
- (The staple) c. 14 Upon which days wool may be shewed in the staple, and in which not. — repealed for England and Wales by Statute Law Revision Act 1863 (26 & 27 Vict. c. 125) and for Ireland by Statute Law (Ireland) Revision Act 1872 (35 & 36 Vict. c. 98)
- (The staple) c. 15 The bounds of every staple, and how far they shall extend. — repealed by Repeal of Acts Concerning Importation Act 1822 (3 Geo. 4. c. 41)

=== Sources ===
- Chronological Table of and Index to the Statutes. Vol. 1: To the End of the Session 59 Vict. Sess. 2 (1895) (13th ed.). London: Her Majesty's Stationery Office. 1896. pp. 26–27 – via Google Books.
- Chronological Table of the Statutes: Covering the Period from 1235 to the End of 1971. London: Her Majesty's Stationery Office. 1972. p. 22. ISBN 978-0-11-840096-1 – via Google Books.
- "Acts of the English Parliament from 1354". legislation.gov.uk. The National Archives.

== 1357 (31 Edw. 3) ==
This session was also traditionally cited as 31 Ed. 3 or 31 E. 3.

- 31 Edw. 3. Stat. 1
  - (Confirmation of charters) c. 1 A confirmation of the Great Charter and the Charter of the Forest. — repealed for England and Wales by Statute Law Revision Act 1863 (26 & 27 Vict. c. 125) and for Ireland by Statute Law (Ireland) Revision Act 1872 (35 & 36 Vict. c. 98)
  - Wool Act 1357 c. 2 No wool shall be bought by fraud to abate the price thereof. Weights shall be sent to all shires. — repealed by Weights and Measures Act 1878 (41 & 42 Vict. c. 49)
  - (Discharge of extreats of felon's goods) c. 3 A man charged with detaining a felon's goods, layeth the fault on another. — repealed by Statute Law Revision Act 1948 (11 & 12 Geo. 6. c. 62)
  - (Probate of testaments) c. 4 Redressing of extortion in bishops offices in proving of wills. — repealed for England and Wales by Statute Law Revision Act 1863 (26 & 27 Vict. c. 125) and for Ireland by Statute Law (Ireland) Revision Act 1872 (35 & 36 Vict. c. 98)
  - (Wine) c. 5 The contents of a tun of wine, and the gauging thereof. — repealed by Repeal of Acts Concerning Importation Act 1822 (3 Geo. 4. c. 41) and Weights and Measures Act 1824 (5 Geo. 4. c. 74)
  - (Franchises) c. 6 The laws of franchises shall have the fines of labourers and servants, &c. forfeited. — repealed for England and Wales by Statute Law Revision Act 1863 (26 & 27 Vict. c. 125) and for Ireland by Statute Law (Ireland) Revision Act 1872 (35 & 36 Vict. c. 98)
  - (The Statute of Labourers, the staple) c. 7 Justices shall enquire of the offenders of the laws of the staple. — repealed for England and Wales by Statute Law Revision Act 1863 (26 & 27 Vict. c. 125) and for Ireland by Statute Law (Ireland) Revision Act 1872 (35 & 36 Vict. c. 98)
  - (Wool) c. 8 That refuse shall be made of wool. All wools, &c. shall be brought to the staple. — repealed for England and Wales by Statute Law Revision Act 1863 (26 & 27 Vict. c. 125) and for Ireland by Statute Law (Ireland) Revision Act 1872 (35 & 36 Vict. c. 98)
  - (Wool) c. 9 The King's council upon cause may defer the transporting of wool. — repealed by Repeal of Acts Concerning Importation Act 1822 (3 Geo. 4. c. 41)
  - (Default of victuallers in London) c. 10 Who may govern or reform the defaults of victuallers in London. — repealed for England and Wales by Statute Law Revision Act 1863 (26 & 27 Vict. c. 125) and for Ireland by Statute Law (Ireland) Revision Act 1872 (35 & 36 Vict. c. 98)
  - Administration of Estates Act 1357 c. 11 To whom the ordinary may commit the administration of the goods of him that dieth intestate. The benefit and charge of an administrator. — repealed by Administration of Estates Act 1925 (15 & 16 Geo. 5. c. 23) and Supreme Court of Judicature (Consolidation) Act 1925 (15 & 16 Geo. 5. c. 49)
  - (Exchequer Chamber) c. 12 The lord chancellor and lord treasurer shall shall examine judgements given in the exchequer. — repealed for England and Wales by Statute Law Revision Act 1863 (26 & 27 Vict. c. 125) and for Ireland by Statute Law (Ireland) Revision Act 1872 (35 & 36 Vict. c. 98)
  - (Pardon, taxation) c. 13 The King's pardon to the commons of the escape of felons and their goods not estreated; and a fifteen granted to him in regard of the same. — repealed for England and Wales by Statute Law Revision Act 1863 (26 & 27 Vict. c. 125) and for Ireland by Statute Law (Ireland) Revision Act 1872 (35 & 36 Vict. c. 98)
  - (Levy of escapes of thieves, etc.) c. 14 How escapes of felons, chattels of felons and fugitives, shall be levied. — repealed by Statute Law Revision Act 1948 (11 & 12 Geo. 6. c. 62)
  - (Sheriff's tourn) c. 15 At what time a sheriff shall hold his turn. — repealed by Sheriffs Act 1887 (50 & 51 Vict. c. 55)
- Statute of Herrings (Herrings: salt fish of Blakeney) 31 Edw. 3. Stat. 2
  - c. 1 Herrings shall not be bought or sold on the sea: at what time they shall be sold. — repealed by Forestalling, Regrating, etc. Act 1844 (7 & 8 Vict. c. 24)
  - c. 2 The order and time of bringing and selling of herring at Yarmouth fair. How many herrings shall be account an hundred, and how many a last. Who shall govern the fair. — repealed by Forestalling, Regrating, etc. Act 1844 (7 & 8 Vict. c. 24)
  - c. 3 What great officers shall take order for selling and buying of fish. — repealed by Forestalling, Regrating, etc. Act 1844 (7 & 8 Vict. c. 24)
- Statute for Salt-Fish (Herrings: salt fish of Blakeney) 31 Edw. 3. Stat. 3
  - c. 1 Doggers and load-ships of Blackney haven shall discharge their fish there. — repealed by Forestalling, Regrating, etc. Act 1844 (7 & 8 Vict. c. 24)
  - c. 2 The price of dogger-fish shall be assessed at the beginning of the fair. Who may buy nets and hooks in Norfolk. — repealed by Forestalling, Regrating, etc. Act 1844 (7 & 8 Vict. c. 24)
- An Ordinance made for the Estate of the Land of Ireland (Ordinatio facta pro terrae Hibernie) 31 Edw. 3. Stat. 4 — repealed for England and Wales by Statute Law Revision Act 1863 (26 & 27 Vict. c. 125) and for Ireland by Statute Law (Ireland) Revision Act 1872 (35 & 36 Vict. c. 98)

=== Sources ===
- Chronological Table of and Index to the Statutes. Vol. 1: To the End of the Session 59 Vict. Sess. 2 (1895) (13th ed.). London: Her Majesty's Stationery Office. 1896. p. 27 – via Google Books.
- Chronological Table of the Statutes: Covering the Period from 1235 to the End of 1971. London: Her Majesty's Stationery Office. 1972. pp. 22–23. ISBN 978-0-11-840096-1 – via Google Books.

== 1361 ==
=== 34 Edw. 3 ===
A parliament at Westminster.

This session was also traditionally cited as 34 Ed. 3 or 34 E. 3.

- Justices of the Peace Act 1361 c. 1 What sort of persons shall be justices of peace; and what authority they shall have. —
  still in force
- (Purveyance) c. 2 No purveyance shall be made but for the King, the Queen, and the King's eldest son. — repealed for England and Wales by Statute Law Revision Act 1863 (26 & 27 Vict. c. 125) and for Ireland by Statute Law (Ireland) Revision Act 1872 (35 & 36 Vict. c. 98)
- (Purveyance) c. 3 When things purveyed for the Queen and Prince shall be paid for. — repealed for England and Wales by Statute Law Revision Act 1863 (26 & 27 Vict. c. 125) and for Ireland by Statute Law (Ireland) Revision Act 1872 (35 & 36 Vict. c. 98)
- (Juries) c. 4 What sort of people shall be returned upon every jury. — repealed for England and Wales by Juries Act 1825 (6 Geo. 4. c. 50) and for Ireland by Juries (Ireland) Act 1833 (3 & 4 Will. 4. c. 91)
- Weights and Measures Act 1361 c. 5 Auncel weight shall be put out. Buying and selling shall be by equal balance. — repealed for England and Wales by Statute Law Revision Act 1863 (26 & 27 Vict. c. 125) and for Ireland by Statute Law (Ireland) Revision Act 1872 (35 & 36 Vict. c. 98)
- (Measures) c. 6 All measures shall be according to the King's standard, &c. — repealed for England and Wales by Continuance, etc. of Laws Act 1623 (21 Jas. 1. c. 28) and for Ireland by Statute Law (Ireland) Revision Act 1872 (35 & 36 Vict. c. 98)
- (Attaint) c. 7 An attaint will lie as well in plea real as personal. — repealed for England and Wales by Statute Law Revision Act 1863 (26 & 27 Vict. c. 125) and for Ireland by Statute Law (Ireland) Revision Act 1872 (35 & 36 Vict. c. 98)
- (Juries) c. 8 The penalty of a juror taking reward to give his verdict. — repealed for England and Wales by Juries Act 1825 (6 Geo. 4. c. 50) and for Ireland by Juries (Ireland) Act 1833 (3 & 4 Will. 4. c. 91)
- Labourers Act 1361 c. 9 The statutes of 23 Edw. 3. cap. 1 and 25 Edw. 3. stat. 1. cap. 1 and 2. touching labourers, carpenters, Masons, &c. confirmed. — repealed for England and Wales by Statute Law Revision Act 1863 (26 & 27 Vict. c. 125) and for Ireland by Statute Law (Ireland) Revision Act 1872 (35 & 36 Vict. c. 98)
- Labourers (No. 2) Act 1361 c. 10 The punishment of labourers, &c. departing from their service into another county. — repealed for England and Wales by Statute Law Revision Act 1863 (26 & 27 Vict. c. 125) and for Ireland by Statute Law (Ireland) Revision Act 1872 (35 & 36 Vict. c. 98)
- (Labourers) c. 11 If a labourer or servant do flee to a city or borough, the chief officer upon request shall deliver him up. — repealed for England and Wales by Statute Law Revision Act 1863 (26 & 27 Vict. c. 125) and for Ireland by Statute Law (Ireland) Revision Act 1872 (35 & 36 Vict. c. 98)
- Forfeitures Act 1361 c. 12 There shall be no forfeiture of lands for treason of dead persons not attainted. — repealed by Statute Law Revision Act 1948 (11 & 12 Geo. 6. c. 62)
- (Escheators) c. 13 By what sort of people, and in what place and manner, an escheator shall take his inquest. — repealed by Civil Procedure Acts Repeal Act 1879 (42 & 43 Vict. c. 59)
- (Escheators) c. 14 In what court traverses of offices found before escheators shall be tried. — repealed by Civil Procedure Acts Repeal Act 1879
- (Confirmation of grants) c. 15 A confirmation of those alienations which the tenants of King Henry he third, &c. did make. — repealed by Statute Law Revision Act 1948 (11 & 12 Geo. 6. c. 62)
- (Fines) c. 16 Non-claim of fines shall hereafter be no bar. — repealed for England and Wales by Statute Law Revision Act 1863 (26 & 27 Vict. c. 125) and for Ireland by Statute Law (Ireland) Revision Act 1872 (35 & 36 Vict. c. 98)
- (Trade, etc. with Ireland) c. 17 Merchandises may be carried into and brought out of Ireland. — repealed for England and Wales by Statute Law Revision Act 1863 (26 & 27 Vict. c. 125) and for Ireland by Statute Law (Ireland) Revision Act 1872 (35 & 36 Vict. c. 98)
- (Trade, etc. with Ireland) c. 18 They which have lands in Ireland, may carry their goods thither, and bring them again. — repealed for England and Wales by Statute Law Revision Act 1863 (26 & 27 Vict. c. 125) and for Ireland by Statute Law (Ireland) Revision Act 1872 (35 & 36 Vict. c. 98)
- (Customs) c. 19 No customers or subsidy shall be paid for canvas to pack wool in. — repealed for England and Wales by Statute Law Revision Act 1863 (26 & 27 Vict. c. 125) and for Ireland by Statute Law (Ireland) Revision Act 1872 (35 & 36 Vict. c. 98)
- Exportation of Corn Act 1361 c. 20 No corn shall be transported but to Calais and Gascoign. — repealed for England and Wales by Continuance, etc. of Laws Act 1623 (21 Jas. 1. c. 28) and for Northern Ireland by Statute Law Revision Act 1950 (14 Geo. 6. c. 6)
- (Exportation of wool, etc.) c. 21 A confirmation of a former grant to denizens to transport wool beyond sea. — repealed for England and Wales by Statute Law Revision Act 1863 (26 & 27 Vict. c. 125) and for Ireland by Statute Law (Ireland) Revision Act 1872 (35 & 36 Vict. c. 98)
- (Finding of hawks) c. 22 How he shall use another man's hawk that taketh it up. — repealed for England and Wales by Criminal Statutes Repeal Act 1827 (7 & 8 Geo. 4. c. 27), for Ireland by Criminal Statutes (Ireland) Repeal Act 1828 (9 Geo. 4. c. 53) and for India by Criminal Law (India) Act 1828 (9 Geo. 4. c. 74)

==== Sources ====
- Chronological Table of and Index to the Statutes. Vol. 1: To the End of the Session 59 Vict. Sess. 2 (1895) (13th ed.). London: Her Majesty's Stationery Office. 1896. pp. 27–28 – via Google Books.
- Chronological Table of the Statutes: Covering the Period from 1235 to the End of 1971. London: Her Majesty's Stationery Office. 1972. p. 23. ISBN 978-0-11-840096-1 – via Google Books.
- "Acts of the English Parliament from 1361". legislation.gov.uk. The National Archives.

=== 35 Edw. 3 ===
This session was also traditionally cited as 35 Ed. 3 or 35 E. 3.

- An Ordinance of Herring (Herrings) All persons may buy herring in the fair at Yarmouth openly, and not privily. No man shall enter into a bargain of herring until the first chapman have done with it. — repealed by Forestalling, Regrating, etc. Act 1844 (7 & 8 Vict. c. 24)

==== Sources ====
- Chronological Table of and Index to the Statutes. Vol. 1: To the End of the Session 59 Vict. Sess. 2 (1895) (13th ed.). London: Her Majesty's Stationery Office. 1896. p. 28 – via Google Books.
- Chronological Table of the Statutes: Covering the Period from 1235 to the End of 1971. London: Her Majesty's Stationery Office. 1972. p. 23. ISBN 978-0-11-840096-1 – via Google Books.

== 1362 (36 Edw. 3) ==
A parliament at Westminster.

This session was also traditionally cited as 36 Ed. 3 or 36 E. 3.

- 36 Edw. 3. Stat. 1
  - (Confirmation of charters, etc.) c. 1 A confirmation of all former statutes. — repealed for England and Wales by Statute Law Revision Act 1863 (26 & 27 Vict. c. 125) and for Ireland by Statute Law (Ireland) Revision Act 1872 (35 & 36 Vict. c. 98)
  - (Purveyance) c. 2 No purveyance but for the King and Queen. The name of purveyor changed into buyer. Ready payment shall be made of things purveyed, and they shall be appraised. — repealed for England and Wales by Statute Law Revision Act 1863 (26 & 27 Vict. c. 125) and for Ireland by Statute Law (Ireland) Revision Act 1872 (35 & 36 Vict. c. 98)
  - (Purveyance) c. 3 The penally of a purveyor who shall receive a reward to spare or charge one. — repealed for England and Wales by Statute Law Revision Act 1863 (26 & 27 Vict. c. 125) and for Ireland by Statute Law (Ireland) Revision Act 1872 (35 & 36 Vict. c. 98)
  - (Purveyance) c. 4 Commissions shall he awarded to enquire of purveyors behaviour. — repealed for England and Wales by Statute Law Revision Act 1863 (26 & 27 Vict. c. 125) and for Ireland by Statute Law (Ireland) Revision Act 1872 (35 & 36 Vict. c. 98)
  - (Purveyance) c. 5 None shall keep any more horses for the King than be assigned unto him. — repealed for England and Wales by Statute Law Revision Act 1863 (26 & 27 Vict. c. 125) and for Ireland by Statute Law (Ireland) Revision Act 1872 (35 & 36 Vict. c. 98)
  - (Purveyance) c. 6 No subjects chator shall buy any thing against the owners consent. — repealed for England and Wales by Statute Law Revision Act 1863 (26 & 27 Vict. c. 125) and for Ireland by Statute Law (Ireland) Revision Act 1872 (35 & 36 Vict. c. 98)
  - (The staple) c. 7 Of what things the mayor and constable of the staple shall take cognisance. — repealed for England and Wales by Statute Law Revision Act 1863 (26 & 27 Vict. c. 125) and for Ireland by Statute Law (Ireland) Revision Act 1872 (35 & 36 Vict. c. 98)
  - (Wages of priests) c. 8 A penalty imposed by the bishop upon priests taking more wages than is assigned. What wages a parish priest may take.— repealed for England and Wales by Continuance, etc. of Laws Act 1623 (21 Jas. 1. c. 28) and for Northern Ireland by Statute Law Revision Act 1950 (14 Geo. 6. c. 6)
  - (Breaches of statutes) c. 9 Whosoever is grieved against these statutes, &c. shall have relief in chancery . — repealed for England and Wales by Statute Law Revision Act 1863 (26 & 27 Vict. c. 125) and for Ireland by Statute Law (Ireland) Revision Act 1872 (35 & 36 Vict. c. 98)
  - (Parliament) c. 10 A parliament shall be holden once in the year. — repealed for England and Wales by Statute Law Revision Act 1863 (26 & 27 Vict. c. 125) and for Ireland by Statute Law (Ireland) Revision Act 1872 (35 & 36 Vict. c. 98)
  - (Customs, exportation) c. 11 The three years subsidy formerly granted shall be no example for the future. All merchants may transport wools. — repealed by Repeal of Acts Concerning Importation Act 1822 (3 Geo. 4. c. 41)
  - (Quarter sessions) c. 12 At what times the four sessions of justices of peace shall be holden. — repealed by Statute Law Revision Act 1948 (11 & 12 Geo. 6. c. 62)
  - (Escheaters) c. 13 An escheator shall have no fee, nor commit waste in wards lands. Lands seised upon an inquest taken before an escheator, shall be letten to farm. — repealed by Escheat (Procedure) Act 1887 (50 & 51 Vict. c. 53)
  - (Appropriation of certain fines, etc.) c. 14 — repealed for England and Wales by Statute Law Revision Act 1863 (26 & 27 Vict. c. 125) and for Ireland by Statute Law (Ireland) Revision Act 1872 (35 & 36 Vict. c. 98)
  - Pleading in English Act 1362 or Statute of Pleading c. 15 Pleas shall be pleaded in the English tongue, and inrolled in Latin. — repealed for England and Wales by Statute Law Revision Act 1863 (26 & 27 Vict. c. 125) and for Ireland by Statute Law (Ireland) Revision Act 1872 (35 & 36 Vict. c. 98)
- Of the Pardon made to the Commonalty of the Realm of England 36 Edw. 3. Stat. 2 The pardon made in the same parliament. — repealed for England and Wales by Statute Law Revision Act 1863 (26 & 27 Vict. c. 125) and for Ireland by Statute Law (Ireland) Revision Act 1872 (35 & 36 Vict. c. 98)

=== Sources ===
- Chronological Table of and Index to the Statutes. Vol. 1: To the End of the Session 59 Vict. Sess. 2 (1895) (13th ed.). London: Her Majesty's Stationery Office. 1896. p. 28 – via Google Books.
- Chronological Table of the Statutes: Covering the Period from 1235 to the End of 1971. London: Her Majesty's Stationery Office. 1972. p. 23. ISBN 978-0-11-840096-1 – via Google Books.

== 1363 ==
=== 37 Edw. 3 ===
A parliament at Westminster.

This session was also traditionally cited as 37 Ed. 3 or 37 E. 3.

- Statut' de Victu et Vestitu (A Statute concerning Diet and Apparel)
  - c. 1 A confirmation of former statutes. — repealed for England and Wales by Statute Law Revision Act 1863 (26 & 27 Vict. c. 125) and for Ireland by Statute Law (Ireland) Revision Act 1872 (35 & 36 Vict. c. 98)
  - Idemptiate Nominis c. 2 An Idemptiate Nominis (Note: 'Idemptiate Nominis' is Latin for 'Redemption of the Name'.) shall be granted upon the wrongful seisure of another's person, lands, or goods. — repealed by Civil Procedure Acts Repeal Act 1879 (42 & 43 Vict. c. 59)
  - c. 3 The several prices of a hen, capon, pullet, and goose. — repealed for England and Wales by Statute Law Revision Act 1863 (26 & 27 Vict. c. 125) and for Ireland by Statute Law (Ireland) Revision Act 1872 (35 & 36 Vict. c. 98)
  - c. 4 A clerk of the remembrance of the exchequer shall he assigned. — repealed for England and Wales by Statute Law Revision Act 1863 (26 & 27 Vict. c. 125) and for Ireland by Statute Law (Ireland) Revision Act 1872 (35 & 36 Vict. c. 98)
  - c. 5 Merchants shall not ingross merchandises to inhance the price of them, nor use but one sort of merchandise. — repealed for England and Wales by Statute Law Revision Act 1863 (26 & 27 Vict. c. 125) and for Ireland by Statute Law (Ireland) Revision Act 1872 (35 & 36 Vict. c. 98)
  - c. 6 Handicraftsmen shall use but one mystery, (Note: 'Mystery' meaning 'craft'. The dictionary definition of mystery at Wiktionary) but workmen may work as they did. — repealed for England and Wales by Statute Law Revision Act 1863 (26 & 27 Vict. c. 125) and for Ireland by Statute Law (Ireland) Revision Act 1872 (35 & 36 Vict. c. 98)
  - c. 7 Goldsmiths work shall be of good sterling, and marked with his own mark. None shall make white vessel and also gild. — repealed for England and Wales by Statute Law Revision Act 1863 (26 & 27 Vict. c. 125) and for Ireland by Statute Law (Ireland) Revision Act 1872 (35 & 36 Vict. c. 98)
  - c. 8 The diet and apparel of servants. — repealed for England and Wales by Statute Law Revision Act 1863 (26 & 27 Vict. c. 125) and for Ireland by Statute Law (Ireland) Revision Act 1872 (35 & 36 Vict. c. 98)
  - c. 9 The apparel of handicraftsmen and yeomen, and of their wives and children. — repealed for England and Wales by Statute Law Revision Act 1863 (26 & 27 Vict. c. 125) and for Ireland by Statute Law (Ireland) Revision Act 1872 (35 & 36 Vict. c. 98)
  - c. 10 What apparel gentlemen under the estate of knights, and, and what esquires of two hundred mark-land, &c. may wear, and what their wives and children. — repealed for England and Wales by Statute Law Revision Act 1863 (26 & 27 Vict. c. 125) and for Ireland by Statute Law (Ireland) Revision Act 1872 (35 & 36 Vict. c. 98)
  - c. 11 The apparel of merchants, citizens, burgesses, and handicraftsmen. — repealed for England and Wales by Statute Law Revision Act 1863 (26 & 27 Vict. c. 125) and for Ireland by Statute Law (Ireland) Revision Act 1872 (35 & 36 Vict. c. 98)
  - c. 12 The apparel of knights which have lands whithin the yearly value of two hundred marks, and of knights and ladies which have four hundred mark land. — repealed for England and Wales by Statute Law Revision Act 1863 (26 & 27 Vict. c. 125) and for Ireland by Statute Law (Ireland) Revision Act 1872 (35 & 36 Vict. c. 98)
  - c. 13 The apparel of several sorts of clerks. — repealed for England and Wales by Statute Law Revision Act 1863 (26 & 27 Vict. c. 125) and for Ireland by Statute Law (Ireland) Revision Act 1872 (35 & 36 Vict. c. 98)
  - c. 14 The apparel of ploughmen, and other of mean estate; and the forfeitures of offenders against this ordinance. — repealed for England and Wales by Statute Law Revision Act 1863 (26 & 27 Vict. c. 125) and for Ireland by Statute Law (Ireland) Revision Act 1872 (35 & 36 Vict. c. 98)
  - c. 15 Clothiers shall make cloths sufficient of the foresaid prices, so that this statute for default of such cloths be in no wise infringed. — repealed for England and Wales by Statute Law Revision Act 1863 (26 & 27 Vict. c. 125) and for Ireland by Statute Law (Ireland) Revision Act 1872 (35 & 36 Vict. c. 98)
  - c. 16 A repeal of the punishment of lands, and of life and member, inflicted by the stat. 27 Ed. 3. stat. 1 cap. 5. (Note: 27 Edw. 3 Stat. 1. cc. 5 & 7) & 7. enquiry shall be made yearly in Gascoine (Note: The Duchy of Gascony was at this time a possession of the English king, this statute being passed during the first peace of the Hundred Years' War.) in the King's dominions, of couchers (Note: A 'coucher' was someone who resided in an area for trade.) of England, which lie there to buy wines. — repealed by Repeal of Acts Concerning Importation Act 1822 (3 Geo. 4. c. 41)
  - c. 17 In what case a writ shall not be abated by exception of cognisance of villenage. (Note: Villenage was a type of serfdom.) — repealed for England and Wales by Statute Law Revision Act 1863 (26 & 27 Vict. c. 125) and for Ireland by Statute Law (Ireland) Revision Act 1872 (35 & 36 Vict. c. 98)
  - c. 18 The order of pursuing a suggestion made to the King. — repealed for England and Wales by Statute Law Revision Act 1863 (26 & 27 Vict. c. 125) and for Ireland by Statute Law (Ireland) Revision Act 1872 (35 & 36 Vict. c. 98)
  - c. 19 How each person shall use a hawk of another's that he taketh up. — repealed by Criminal Statutes Repeal Act 1827 (7 & 8 Geo. 4. c. 27)

==== Sources ====
- Chronological Table of and Index to the Statutes. Vol. 1: To the End of the Session 59 Vict. Sess. 2 (1895) (13th ed.). London: Her Majesty's Stationery Office. 1896. p. 28 – via Google Books.
- Chronological Table of the Statutes: Covering the Period from 1235 to the End of 1971. London: Her Majesty's Stationery Office. 1972. p. 23. ISBN 978-0-11-840096-1 – via Google Books.

=== 38 Edw. 3 ===
This session was also traditionally cited as 38 Ed. 3 or 38 E. 3.

- (Gold and silver, fines, merchants, jurors, etc.) 38 Edw. 3. Stat. 1
  - c. 1 Former statutes shall be observed and executed. — repealed for England and Wales by Statute Law Revision Act 1863 (26 & 27 Vict. c. 125) and for Ireland by Statute Law (Ireland) Revision Act 1872 (35 & 36 Vict. c. 98)
  - c. 2 Any merchant may use more merchandises than one, notwithstanding the statute of 37 Edw. 3. c. 5. (Note: 37 Edw. 3. c. 5) Who only may transport gold or silver. — repealed for England and Wales by Statute Law Revision Act 1863 (26 & 27 Vict. c. 125) and for Ireland by Statute Law (Ireland) Revision Act 1872 (35 & 36 Vict. c. 98)
  - c. 3 Fines shall be taken in the presence of the pledges. — repealed for England and Wales by Statute Law Revision Act 1863 (26 & 27 Vict. c. 125) and for Ireland by Statute Law (Ireland) Revision Act 1872 (35 & 36 Vict. c. 98)
  - c. 4 Penal bonds, in the third person shall be void. — repealed for England and Wales by Statute Law Revision Act 1863 (26 & 27 Vict. c. 125) and for Ireland by Statute Law (Ireland) Revision Act 1872 (35 & 36 Vict. c. 98)
  - c. 5 Any man may wage his law against a Londoner's papers. — repealed for England and Wales by Statute Law Revision Act 1863 (26 & 27 Vict. c. 125) and for Ireland by Statute Law (Ireland) Revision Act 1872 (35 & 36 Vict. c. 98)
  - c. 6 A repeal of the felony imposed by stat. 27 Ed. 3. stat. 2. c. 3. (Note: 27 Edw. 3 Stat. 2. c. 3) for transporting of wool, &c. by Englishmen; but the forfeiture of lands and goods shall stand. — repealed for England and Wales by Statute Law Revision Act 1863 (26 & 27 Vict. c. 125) and for Ireland by Statute Law (Ireland) Revision Act 1872 (35 & 36 Vict. c. 98)
  - c. 7 A confirmation of the statute of the staple, made by 27 Ed. 3. stat. 2. (Note: Ordinance of the Staples 1353 (27 Edw. 3 Stat. 2)) — repealed by Repeal of Acts Concerning Importation Act 1822 (3 Geo. 4. c. 41)
  - c. 8 A ship shall not be lost for a small thing therein not customed. — repealed by Repeal of Acts Concerning Importation Act 1822 (3 Geo. 4. c. 41)
  - c. 9 The punishment of him which proveth not his suggestion made to the King. — repealed for England and Wales by Statute Law Revision Act 1863 (26 & 27 Vict. c. 125) and for Ireland by Statute Law (Ireland) Revision Act 1872 (35 & 36 Vict. c. 98)
  - c. 10 A confirmation of the statutes made for wines. — repealed by Repeal of Acts Concerning Importation Act 1822 (3 Geo. 4. c. 41)
  - c. 11 Merchants denizens may fetch wines, and aliens may bring them. — repealed by Repeal of Acts Concerning Importation Act 1822 (3 Geo. 4. c. 41)
  - c. 12 The punishment of a juror taking reward to give verdict, and of embraceors. — repealed for England and Wales by Statute Law Revision Act 1863 (26 & 27 Vict. c. 125) and for Ireland by Statute Law (Ireland) Revision Act 1872 (35 & 36 Vict. c. 98)
- (Obtaining benefices from Rome) 38 Edw. 3. Stat. 2
  - c. 1 Persons receiving citations from Rome in causes pertaining to the King, &c. to incur the penalties of 25 Edw. 3. stat. 6. (Note: De provisoribus (25 Edw. 3 Stat. 4)) — repealed by Statute Law Revision Act 1948 (11 & 12 Geo. 6. c. 62)
  - c. 2 Suspected persons not appearing before the King's justices, after warning, to incur the penalty of 27 Edw. III. stat. 1. cap. 1. (Note: 27 Edw. 3 Stat. 1. c. 1) — repealed by Statute Law Revision Act 1948 (11 & 12 Geo. 6. c. 62)
  - c. 3 Such offenders to be out of the King's protection, and punished according to the statute of 27 Edw. III. stat. 1. cap. 1. — repealed by Statute Law Revision Act 1948 (11 & 12 Geo. 6. c. 62)
  - c. 4 The punishment of those who sue falsely and maliciously upon this statute. The consent of the King and parliament to impeach offenders against the same. — repealed by Statute Law Revision Act 1948 (11 & 12 Geo. 6. c. 62)

==== Sources ====
- Chronological Table of and Index to the Statutes. Vol. 1: To the End of the Session 59 Vict. Sess. 2 (1895) (13th ed.). London: Her Majesty's Stationery Office. 1896. p. 28 – via Google Books.
- Chronological Table of the Statutes: Covering the Period from 1235 to the End of 1971. London: Her Majesty's Stationery Office. 1972. p. 23. ISBN 978-0-11-840096-1 – via Google Books.

== 1368 (42 Edw. 3) ==
This statute says that it was made at Westminster on 1 May 1368: see Halsbury's Statutes.

This session was also traditionally cited as 42 Ed. 3 or 42 E. 3.

- (Confirmation of charters) c. 1 A confirmation of the Great Charter and the Charter of the Forest, and a repeal of those statutes that be made to the contrary. — repealed for England and Wales by Statute Law Revision Act 1863 (26 & 27 Vict. c. 125) and for Ireland by Statute Law (Ireland) Revision Act 1872 (35 & 36 Vict. c. 98)
- (Confirmation of pardon) c. 2 A writ of allowance of a pardon granted Anno 36 Edw. III. — repealed for England and Wales by Statute Law Revision Act 1863 (26 & 27 Vict. c. 125) and for Ireland by Statute Law (Ireland) Revision Act 1872 (35 & 36 Vict. c. 98)
- Due Process of Law Act 1368 c. 3 None shall be put to answer an accusation made to the King without presentment. —
  still in force
- (Commission of inquiry) c. 4 To what sort of people commissions of inquiry shall be granted. — repealed by the Statute Law Revision Act 1948 (11 & 12 Geo. 6. c. 62)
- (Escheators) c. 5 Of what sufficiency in land every escheator must be; he shall execute his office in his own proper person. — repealed for England and Wales by Statute Law Revision Act 1863 (26 & 27 Vict. c. 125) and for Ireland by Statute Law (Ireland) Revision Act 1872 (35 & 36 Vict. c. 98)
- Labourers Act 1368 c. 6 The statute 25 Ed. III. stat. 1. c. 1. (Note: Statute of Labourers 1351 (25 Edw. 3 Stat. 2. c. 1)) concerning labourers, &c. shall be executed. — repealed for England and Wales by Statute Law Revision Act 1863 (26 & 27 Vict. c. 125) and for Ireland by Statute Law (Ireland) Revision Act 1872 (35 & 36 Vict. c. 98)
- (Londoners) c. 7 Londoners and none other, shall sell victuals by retail. — repealed for England and Wales by Statute Law Revision Act 1863 (26 & 27 Vict. c. 125) and for Ireland by Statute Law (Ireland) Revision Act 1872 (35 & 36 Vict. c. 98)
- (Importation of wine) c. 8 English merchants shall not pass into Gascoigne to fetch wines, nor shall buy any wines until they be landed. — repealed for England and Wales by Statute Law Revision Act 1863 (26 & 27 Vict. c. 125) and for Ireland by Statute Law (Ireland) Revision Act 1872 (35 & 36 Vict. c. 98)
- (Crown debts, etc.) c. 9 Estreats shall be shewed to the party indebted, and that which is paid shall be totted. No sheriff, &c. shall continue in office above a year. — repealed for England and Wales by Statute Law Revision Act 1863 (26 & 27 Vict. c. 125) and for Ireland by Statute Law (Ireland) Revision Act 1872 (35 & 36 Vict. c. 98)
- Naturalization Act 1368 c. 10 Children born beyond sea in the King's dominions shall be inheritable in England. — repealed by the British Nationality and Status of Aliens Act 1914 (4 & 5 Geo. 5. c. 17)
- Return of Jurors' Names at Nisi Prius Act 1368 c. 11 Copies of panels shall he delivered to the parties six days before the sessions. — repealed for England and Wales by Juries Act 1825 (6 Geo. 4. c. 50) and for England and Wales and Northern Ireland by the Statute Law Revision Act 1948 (11 & 12 Geo. 6. c. 62)

=== Sources ===
- Chronological Table of and Index to the Statutes. Vol. 1: To the End of the Session 59 Vict. Sess. 2 (1895) (13th ed.). London: Her Majesty's Stationery Office. 1896. p. 28 – via Google Books.
- Chronological Table of the Statutes: Covering the Period from 1235 to the End of 1971. London: Her Majesty's Stationery Office. 1972. pp. 23–24. ISBN 978-0-11-840096-1 – via Google Books.
- "Acts of the English Parliament from 1368". legislation.gov.uk. The National Archives.

== 1369 (43 Edw. 3) ==
This session was also traditionally cited as 43 Ed. 3 or 43 E. 3.

- (The staple) c. 1 The wool staple at Calais removed, what towns in England it shall be holden at, and the former appointment of the Irish and Welsh staples confirmed. — repealed by Repeal of Acts Concerning Importation Act 1822 (3 Geo. 4. c. 41)
- (Trade with Gascony) c. 2 The conditions on which English, Irish, and Welshment, not being artificers, may import wine from Gascoigne, notwithstanding the statute of 42 Ed. III. c. 8. (Note: 42 Edw. 3. c. 8) — repealed by Repeal of Acts Concerning Importation Act 1822 (3 Geo. 4. c. 41)
- c. 3 The King's butler, or his lieutenants, shall take no more wines than is commanded. — repealed for England and Wales by Statute Law Revision Act 1863 (26 & 27 Vict. c. 125) and for Ireland by Statute Law (Ireland) Revision Act 1872 (35 & 36 Vict. c. 98)
- (Pardon) c. 4 The King's general pardon to all men of vert and venison saving to the officers of his forest, &c. — repealed for England and Wales by Statute Law Revision Act 1863 (26 & 27 Vict. c. 125) and for Ireland by Statute Law (Ireland) Revision Act 1872 (35 & 36 Vict. c. 98)

=== Sources ===
- Chronological Table of and Index to the Statutes. Vol. 1: To the End of the Session 59 Vict. Sess. 2 (1895) (13th ed.). London: Her Majesty's Stationery Office. 1896. p. 28 – via Google Books.
- Chronological Table of the Statutes: Covering the Period from 1235 to the End of 1971. London: Her Majesty's Stationery Office. 1972. p. 24. ISBN 978-0-11-840096-1 – via Google Books.

== 1371 (45 Edw. 3) ==
A parliament at Westminster.

This session was also traditionally cited as 45 Ed. 3 or 45. E. 3.

- (Confirmation of charters) c. 1 A confirmation of the Great Charter, and the Charter of the Forest in all points. — repealed for England and Wales by Statute Law Revision Act 1863 (26 & 27 Vict. c. 125) and for Ireland by Statute Law (Ireland) Revision Act 1872 (35 & 36 Vict. c. 98)
- (Weirs) c. 2 The penalty of him that setteth up or enhanceth wares. — repealed for England and Wales by Salmon Fishery Act 1861 (24 & 25 Vict. c. 109) and for Ireland by Statute Law (Ireland) Revision Act 1872 (35 & 36 Vict. c. 98)
- (Prohibition to spiritual courts) Prohibition to spiritual courts in plea for tithe of wood of twenty years growth c. 3 A prohibition shall be granted where a suit shall be commenced in a spiritual court for Sylva caedua. — repealed by Statute Law Revision Act 1948 (11 & 12 Geo. 6. c. 62)
- (Taxation) c. 4 No imposition shall be set upon merchandises of the staple, without the assent of parliament. — repealed for England and Wales by Statute Law Revision Act 1863 (26 & 27 Vict. c. 125) and for Ireland by Statute Law (Ireland) Revision Act 1872 (35 & 36 Vict. c. 98)

=== Sources ===
- Chronological Table of and Index to the Statutes. Vol. 1: To the End of the Session 59 Vict. Sess. 2 (1895) (13th ed.). London: Her Majesty's Stationery Office. 1896. p. 28 – via Google Books.
- Chronological Table of the Statutes: Covering the Period from 1235 to the End of 1971. London: Her Majesty's Stationery Office. 1972. p. 24. ISBN 978-0-11-840096-1 – via Google Books.

== 1372 (46 Edw. 3) ==
The 44th Parliament of King Edward III, which met from 3 November 1372 until 24 November 1372.

This session was also traditionally cited as 46 Ed. 3 or 46 E. 3.

- Knights of the Shire Act 1372 — repealed by Statute Law Revision Act 1871 (34 & 35 Vict. c. 116)

=== Sources ===
- Chronological Table of and Index to the Statutes. Vol. 1: To the End of the Session 59 Vict. Sess. 2 (1895) (13th ed.). London: Her Majesty's Stationery Office. 1896. p. 28 – via Google Books.
- Chronological Table of the Statutes: Covering the Period from 1235 to the End of 1971. London: Her Majesty's Stationery Office. 1972. p. 24. ISBN 978-0-11-840096-1 – via Google Books.

== 1373 (47 Edw. 3) ==
The 45th Parliament of King Edward III, which met at Westminster from 21 November 1373 until 10 December 1373.

This session was also traditionally cited as 47 Ed. 3 or 47 E. 3.

- (Cloth) c. 1 The length and breadth of cloth of ray, and cloth of colour. — repealed for England and Wales by Statute Law Revision Act 1863 (26 & 27 Vict. c. 125) and for Ireland by Statute Law (Ireland) Revision Act 1872 (35 & 36 Vict. c. 98)
- (Currency) c. 2 The value of a Scottish groat shall be three pence. — repealed for England and Wales by Statute Law Revision Act 1863 (26 & 27 Vict. c. 125) and for Ireland by Statute Law (Ireland) Revision Act 1872 (35 & 36 Vict. c. 98)

=== Sources ===
- Chronological Table of and Index to the Statutes. Vol. 1: To the End of the Session 59 Vict. Sess. 2 (1895) (13th ed.). London: Her Majesty's Stationery Office. 1896. p. 28 – via Google Books.
- Chronological Table of the Statutes: Covering the Period from 1235 to the End of 1971. London: Her Majesty's Stationery Office. 1972. p. 24. ISBN 978-0-11-840096-1 – via Google Books.

== 1376 (50 Edw. 3) ==
The 46th Parliament of King Edward III, which met at Westminster from 28 April 1376 until 10 July 1376.

This session was also traditionally cited as 50 Ed. 3, 50 E. 3, 50 & 51 Edw. 3, 50 & 51 Ed. 3 or 50 & 51 E. 3.

Of the Pardons and Graces granted by the King to the Commonalty of His Realm of England; in the Fiftieth year of King Edward III.

- (Confirmation of liberties and charters) c. 1 A confirmation of the liberties of the church. — repealed for England and Wales by Statute Law Revision Act 1863 (26 & 27 Vict. c. 125) and for Ireland by Statute Law (Ireland) Revision Act 1872 (35 & 36 Vict. c. 98)
- (Confirmation of liberties and charters) c. 2 A confirmation of the Great Charter and the Charter of the Forest. — repealed for England and Wales by Statute Law Revision Act 1863 (26 & 27 Vict. c. 125) and for Ireland by Statute Law (Ireland) Revision Act 1872 (35 & 36 Vict. c. 98)
- (Pardon) c. 3 The King's pardon to the people in the year of his jubilee. — repealed for England and Wales by Statute Law Revision Act 1863 (26 & 27 Vict. c. 125) and for Ireland by Statute Law (Ireland) Revision Act 1872 (35 & 36 Vict. c. 98)
- c. 4 No prohibition shall be allowed after consultation duly granted. — repealed for England and Wales by Ecclesiastical Jurisdiction Measure 1963 (No. 1) and for Northern Ireland by Statute Law Revision Act 1963 (c. 30) and
- (Arrest of clergy) c. 5 None shall arrest priests or clerks doing divine service. — repealed for England and Wales by Statute Law Revision Act 1863 (26 & 27 Vict. c. 125) and for Ireland by Statute Law (Ireland) Revision Act 1872 (35 & 36 Vict. c. 98)
- (Fraudulent conveyances) c. 6 Fraudulent assurances of lands or goods, to deceive creditors, shall be void. — repealed for England and Wales by Statute Law Revision Act 1863 (26 & 27 Vict. c. 125) and for Ireland by Statute Law (Ireland) Revision Act 1872 (35 & 36 Vict. c. 98)
- (Cloth) c. 7 Woolen cloths shall not be transported before they be fulled. — repealed by Repeal of Acts Concerning Importation Act 1822 (3 Geo. 4. c. 41)
- (Cloth) c. 8 Certain cloths whereof no subsidy or aulnage shall be paid. — repealed for England and Wales by Statute Law Revision Act 1863 (26 & 27 Vict. c. 125) and for Ireland by Statute Law (Ireland) Revision Act 1872 (35 & 36 Vict. c. 98)

=== Sources ===
- Chronological Table of and Index to the Statutes. Vol. 1: To the End of the Session 59 Vict. Sess. 2 (1895) (13th ed.). London: Her Majesty's Stationery Office. 1896. p. 29 – via Google Books.
- Chronological Table of the Statutes: Covering the Period from 1235 to the End of 1971. London: Her Majesty's Stationery Office. 1972. p. 24. ISBN 978-0-11-840096-1 – via Google Books.

== See also ==
- List of acts of the Parliament of England
