= Poynings' Law (confirmation of English statutes) =

1494 law subordinating the Irish parliament to England

Poynings' Law (Note: Poynings' Act 1495' in the Republic of Ireland)
- Act of Parliament
- Parliament of Ireland
- Long title: An Act confirming all the Statutes made in England.
- Citation: 10 Hen. 7. c. 22 (I) (The Irish Statutes numbering); 10 Hen.7 c.39 (Analecta Hibernica numbering)
- Introduced by: Probably Sir Edward Poynings, Lord Deputy of Ireland (Lords)
- Territorial extent: Ireland

Dates
- Royal assent: 1494
- Commencement: 1 December 1494
- Repealed: 8 May 2007 (Republic of Ireland)

Other legislation
- Amended by: Short Titles Act (Northern Ireland) 1951
- Repealed by: Statute Law Revision Act 2007 (Republic of Ireland)
- Relates to: Statute Law Revision Act 1863; Statute Law (Ireland) Revision Act 1872

Status
- Republic of Ireland: Repealed
- Northern Ireland: Current legislation

Text of statute as originally enacted

Revised text of statute as amended

Text of the Poynings' Law 1495 as in force today (including any amendments) within the United Kingdom, from legislation.gov.uk.

An Act confirming all the Statutes made in England (10 Hen. 7. c. 22 (I); short title Poynings' Law in Northern Ireland and Poynings' Act 1495 in the Republic of Ireland) is an act of the Parliament of Ireland which gave all statutes "late made" by the Parliament of England the force of law in the Lordship of Ireland. It was passed by Poynings' Parliament, along with other acts strengthening English law in Ireland.

The English acts specified to be adopted in Ireland were "all estatutes, late made within the said realm of England, concerning or belonging to the common and publique weal of the same". The precise scope of this vague description was unclear, and eventually it was taken to include all acts passed by all previous English parliaments. The 1495 act also annulled any Irish statutes which contradicted the adopted English ones. While most of the important English statutes had previously been explicitly adopted by Irish parliaments, vague language and gaps in the parliamentary records made for uncertainty as regards many.

The act was passed in tandem with another act commonly called "Poynings' Law" which provided that future Irish parliaments could only make laws that had been pre-approved by the Irish Privy Council and English Privy Council. The net effect of the two Poynings' Laws was to bring the Irish statute book in line with the English one and prevent the Dublin Castle administration acting contrary to the wishes of the English administration. This other Poynings' Law was largely repealed by the Constitution of 1782, which included an act adopting some British statutes to Ireland, framed as "extending certain of the provisions" of the 1495 confirmation of English statutes.

Many of the English acts adopted by Poynings' Law were repealed with respect to Ireland by the Statute Law Revision (Ireland) Act 1872 (35 & 36 Vict. c. 98), having already been repealed with respect to England by the Statute Law Revision Act 1863 (26 & 27 Vict. c. 125) and others. Poynings' Law itself remains in force in Northern Ireland. In the republic, it was repealed by the Statute Law Revision Act 2007, without thereby repealing the English statutes it referred to, a few of which remain in force.

== Bibliography ==
- "10 Hen.7 c.22 (c.39)". The Statutes at Large, passed in the Parliaments held in Ireland. Vol. 1: From the third year of Edward the Second, A.D. 1310, to the eleventh, twelfth and thirteenth years of James the First, A.D. 1612, inclusive. Boulter Grierson. 1765. pp. 56–57.
