= History of competition law =

Legal history

The history of competition law refers to attempts by governments to regulate competitive markets for goods and services, leading up to the modern competition or antitrust laws around the world today. The earliest records traces back to the efforts of Roman legislators to control price fluctuations and unfair trade practices. Throughout the Middle Ages in Europe, kings and queens repeatedly cracked down on monopolies, including those created through state legislation. The English common law doctrine of restraint of trade became the precursor to modern competition law. This grew out of the codifications of United States antitrust statutes, which in turn had considerable influence on the development of European Community competition laws after the Second World War. Increasingly, the focus has moved to international competition enforcement in a globalised economy.

== Early history ==
Laws governing competition law are found in over two millennia of history. Roman Emperors and Mediaeval monarchs alike used tariffs to stabilise prices or support local production. The formal study of "competition", began in earnest during the 18th century with such works as Adam Smith's The Wealth of Nations. Different terms were used to describe this area of the law, including "restrictive practices", "the law of monopolies", "combination acts" and the "restraint of trade".

=== Roman legislation ===
The earliest surviving example of modern competition law's ancestors appears in the Lex Julia de Annona, enacted during the Roman Republic around 50 BC. To protect the corn trade, heavy fines were imposed on anyone directly, deliberately and insidiously stopping supply ships. Under Diocletian, in 301 AD an Edict on maximum prices established a death penalty for anyone violating a tariff system, for example by buying up, concealing or contriving the scarcity of everyday goods. The most legislation came under the Constitution of Zeno of 483 AD which can be traced into Florentine Municipal laws of 1322 and 1325. It provided for property confiscation and banishment for any trade combinations or joint action of monopolies private or granted by the Emperor. Zeno rescinded all previously granted exclusive rights. Justinian I also introduced legislation not long after to pay officials to manage state monopolies. As Europe slipped into the Dark Ages, so did the records of law making until the Middle Ages brought greater expansion of trade in the time of lex mercatoria.

=== Middle ages ===
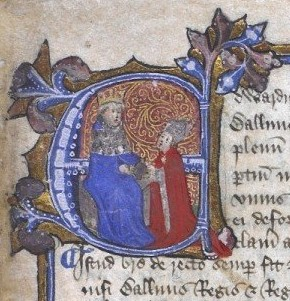
Edward III during the Black Death enacted the Statute of Labourers to cap wages, and provide double damages against infringers

Legislation in England to control monopolies and restrictive practices were in force well before the Norman Conquest. The Domesday Book recorded that "foresteel" (i.e. forestalling, the practice of buying up goods before they reached market and then inflating the prices) was one of three forfeitures that King Edward the Confessor could carry out through England. Concern for fair prices also led to attempts to directly regulate the market. Under Henry III, an Act was passed in 1266 to fix bread and ale prices in correspondence with corn prices laid down by the assizes. Penalties for breach included amercements, pillory and tumbrel. A fourteenth century statute labelled forestallers as "oppressors of the poor and the community at large and enemies of the whole country." Under King Edward III, the Statute of Labourers of 1349 fixed wages of artificers and workmen and decreed that foodstuffs should be sold at reasonable prices. On top of existing penalties, the statute stated that overcharging merchants must pay the injured party double the sum they received, an idea that has been replicated in punitive treble damages under US antitrust law. Also under Edward III, the following statutory provision in the poetic language of the time outlawed trade combinations.

"...we have ordained and established, that no merchant or other shall make Confederacy, Conspiracy, Coin, Imagination, or Murmur, or Evil Device in any point that may turn to the Impeachment, Disturbance, Defeating or Decay of the said Staples, or of anything that to them pertaineth, or may pertain."

Examples of legislation in Europe include the constitutiones juris metallici by Wenceslas II of Bohemia between 1283 and 1305, condemning combinations of ore traders increasing prices; the Municipal Statutes of Florence in 1322 and 1325 followed Zeno's legislation against state monopolies; and under Emperor Charles V in the Holy Roman Empire a law was passed "to prevent losses resulting from monopolies and improper contracts which many merchants and artisans made in the Netherlands." In 1553 King Henry VIII reintroduced tariffs for foodstuffs, designed to stabilise prices in the face of fluctuations in supply from overseas. The legislation read here that whereas,

"it is very hard and difficult to put certain prices to any such things... [it is necessary because] prices of such victuals be many times enhanced and raised by the Greedy Covetousness and Appetites of the Owners of such Victuals, by occasion of ingrossing and regrating the same, more than upon any reasonable or just ground or cause, to the great damage and impoverishing of the King's subjects."

Around this time, organisations representing various tradesmen and handicraftspeople, known as guilds had been established and enjoyed many concessions and exemptions from the laws against monopolies. The privileges conferred were not abolished until the Municipal Corporations Act 1835.

=== Renaissance developments ===
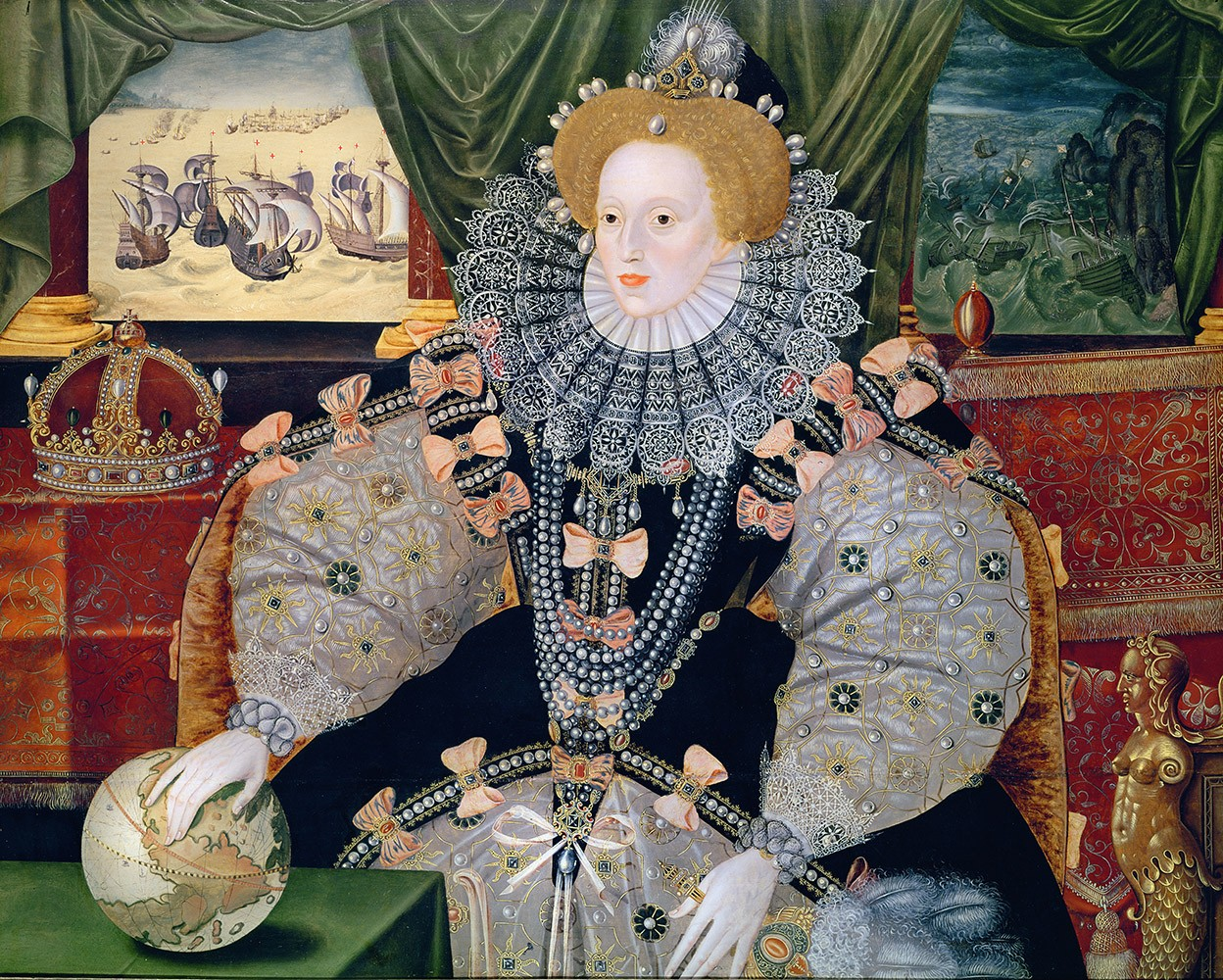
Elizabeth I assured monopolies would not be abused in the early era of globalisation

Europe around the 15th century was changing quickly. The new world had just been opened up, overseas trade and plunder was pouring wealth through the international economy and attitudes among businessmen were shifting. In 1561, a system of Industrial Monopoly Licences, similar to modern patents had been introduced into England. But by the reign of Queen Elizabeth I, the system was reputedly much abused and used merely to preserve privileges, encouraging nothing new in the way of innovation or manufacture. When a protest was made in the House of Commons and a Bill was introduced, the Queen convinced the protesters to challenge the case in the courts. This was the catalyst for the Case of Monopolies or Darcy v Allin. The plaintiff, an officer of the Queen's household, had been granted the sole right of making playing cards and claimed damages for the defendant's infringement of this right. The court found the grant void and that three characteristics of monopoly were (1) price increases (2) quality decrease (3) the tendency to reduce artificers to idleness and beggary. This put a temporary end to complaints about monopoly, until King James I began to grant them again. In 1623 Parliament passed the Statute of Monopolies, which for the most part excluded patent rights from its prohibitions, as well as the guilds. From King Charles I, through the civil war and to King Charles II, monopolies continued, and were considered especially useful for raising revenue. Then in 1684, in East India Company v Sandys it was decided that exclusive rights to trade only outside the realm were legitimate on the grounds that only large and powerful concerns could trade in the conditions prevailing overseas. In 1710, to deal with high coal prices caused by a Newcastle Coal Monopoly, the New Law was passed. Its provisions stated that "all and every contract or contracts, Covenants and Agreements, whether the same be in writing or not in writing...[between] persons whatsoever concerned the said Coal trade, for Ingrossing Coals, or for restraining or hindering any Person or Persons whomsoever from freely... disposing of Coals.... are hereby declared to be illegal." When Adam Smith wrote the Wealth of Nations in 1776 he was somewhat cynical of the possibility for change.

"To expect indeed that freedom of trade should ever be entirely restored in Great Britain is as absurd as to expect that Oceana or Utopia should ever be established in it. Not only the prejudices of the public, but what is more unconquerable, the private interests of many individuals irresistibly oppose it. The Member of Parliament who supports any proposal for strengthening this Monopoly is seen to acquire not only the reputation for understanding trade, but great popularity and influence with an order of men whose members and wealth render them of great importance."

=== Restraint of trade ===
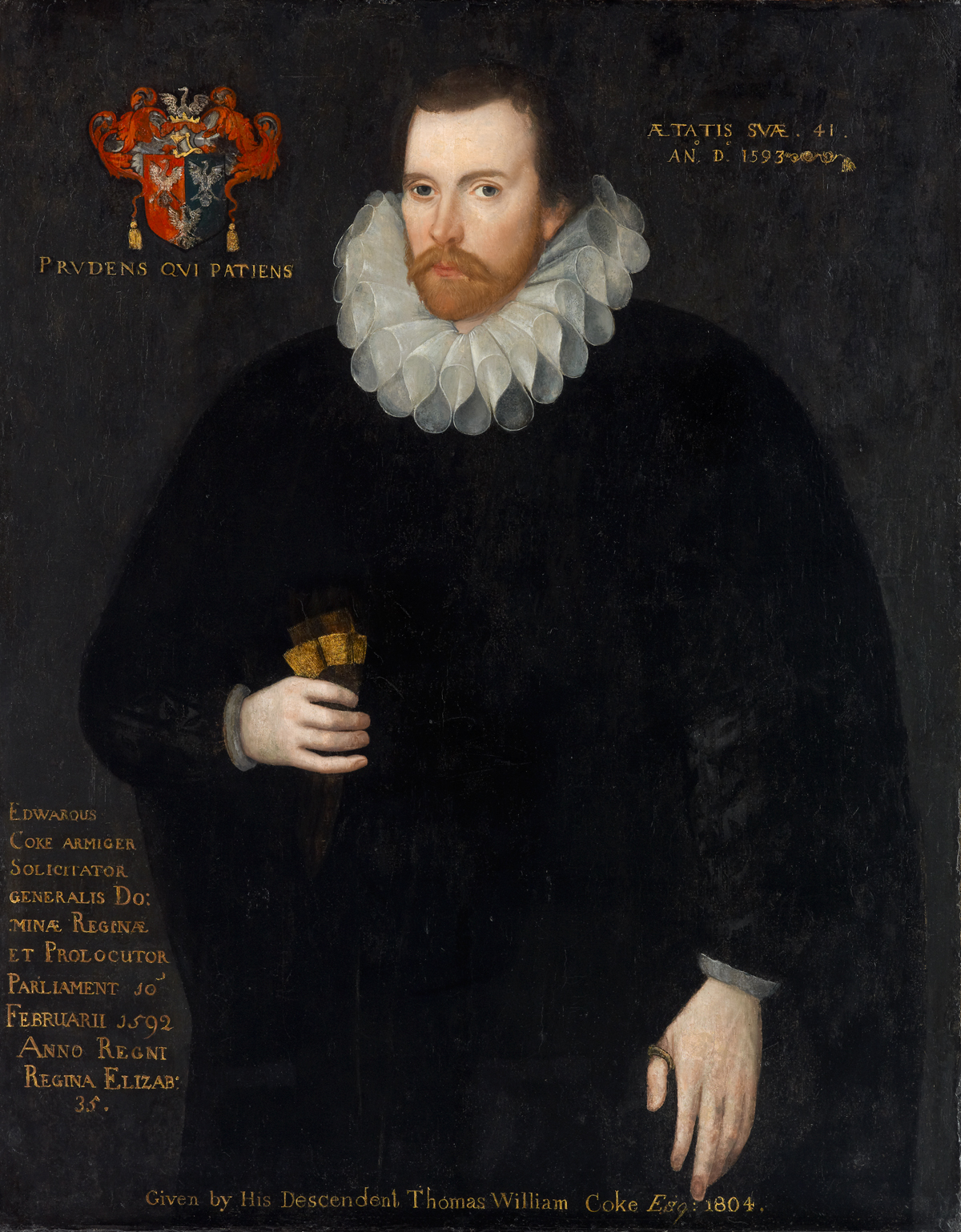
Judge Coke in the 17th century thought that general restraints on trade were unreasonable.

The English law of restraint of trade is the direct predecessor to modern competition law. Its current use is small, given modern and economically oriented statutes in most common law countries. Its approach was based on the two concepts of prohibiting agreements that ran counter to public policy, unless the reasonableness of an agreement could be shown. A restraint of trade is simply some kind of agreed provision that is designed to restrain another's trade. For example, in Nordenfelt v Maxim, Nordenfelt Gun Co a Swedish arms inventor promised on sale of his business to an American gun maker that he "would not make guns or ammunition anywhere in the world, and would not compete with Maxim in any way."

To consider whether or not there is a restraint of trade in the first place, both parties must have provided valuable consideration for their agreement. In Dyer's case a dyer had given a bond not to exercise his trade in the same town as the plaintiff for six months but the plaintiff had promised nothing in return. On hearing the plaintiff's attempt to enforce this restraint, Hull J exclaimed:

"per Dieu, if the plaintiff were here, he should go to prison until he had paid a fine to the King."

The common law has evolved to reflect changing business conditions. So in the 1613 case of Rogers v Parry a court held that a joiner who promised not to trade from his house for 21 years could have this bond enforced against him since the time and place was certain. It was also held that a man cannot bind himself to not use his trade generally by Chief Justice Coke. This was followed in Broad v Jolyffe and Mitchel v Reynolds where Lord Macclesfield asked, "What does it signify to a tradesman in London what another does in Newcastle?" In times of such slow communications, commerce around the country it seemed axiomatic that a general restraint served no legitimate purpose for one's business and ought to be void. But already in 1880 in Roussillon v Roussillon Lord Justice Fry stated that a restraint unlimited in space need not be void, since the real question was whether it went further than necessary for the promisee's protection. So in the Nordenfelt case Lord McNaughton rule that while one could validly promise to "not make guns or ammunition anywhere in the world" it was and unreasonable restraint to "not compete with Maxim in any way." This approach in England was confirmed by the House of Lords in Mason v The Provident Supply and Clothing Co

== Modern age ==
Modern competition law begins with the United States legislation of the Sherman Act of 1890 and the Clayton Act of 1914. While other, particularly European, countries also had some form of regulation on monopolies and cartels, the U.S. codification of the common law position on restraint of trade had a widespread effect on subsequent competition law development. Both after World War II and after the fall of the Berlin Wall, competition law has gone through phases of renewed attention and legislative updates around the world.

=== United States antitrust ===
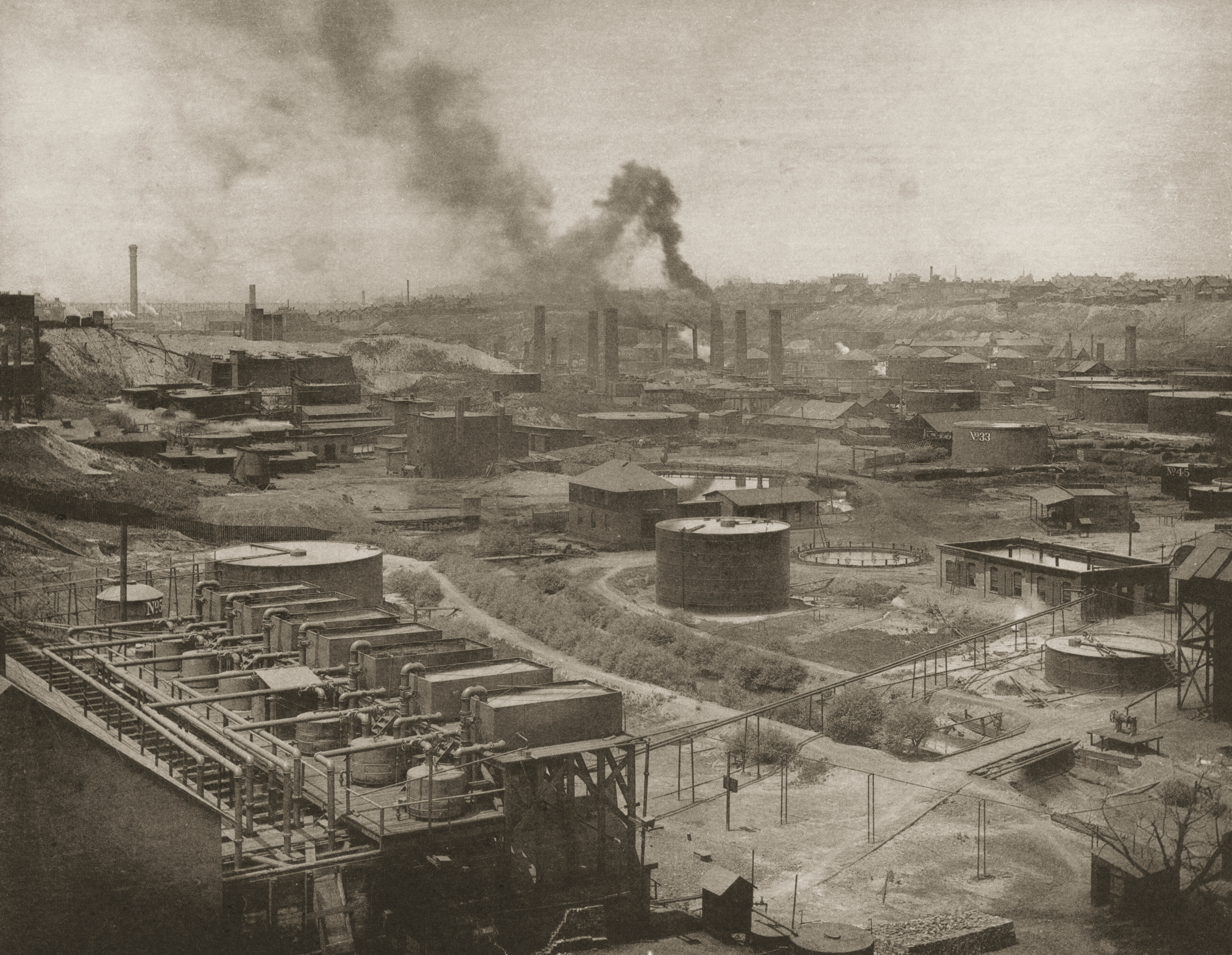
Standard Oil was one of the greatest companies to be broken up under United States antitrust laws

The American term anti-trust arose not because the U.S. statutes had anything to do with ordinary trust law, but because the large American corporations used trusts to conceal the nature of their business arrangements. Big trusts became synonymous with big monopolies, the perceived threat to democracy and the free market these trusts represented led passage of the Sherman and Clayton Acts. These laws, in part, codified past American and English common law of restraints of trade. Senator Hoar, an author of the Sherman Act said in a debate, "We have affirmed the old doctrine of the common law in regard to all inter-state and international commercial transactions and have clothed the United States courts with authority to enforce that doctrine by injunction." Evidence of the common law basis of the Sherman and Clayton Acts is found in Standard Oil of New Jersey v. United States, where Chief Justice White explicitly linked the Sherman Act with the common law and sixteenth-century English statutes on engrossing. The Act's wording also reflects common law. The first two sections read as follows,

"Section 1. Every contract, combination in the form of trust or otherwise, or conspiracy, in restraint of trade or commerce among the several States, or with foreign nations, is declared to be illegal. Every person who shall make any contract or engage in any combination or conspiracy hereby declared to be illegal shall be deemed guilty of a felony, and, on conviction thereof, shall be punished by fine....

Section 2. Every person who shall monopolize, or attempt to monopolize, or combine or conspire with any other person or persons, to monopolize any part of the trade or commerce among the several States, or with foreign nations, shall be deemed guilty of a felony, and, on conviction thereof, shall be punished by fine...."

The Sherman Act did not have the immediate effects its authors intended, although Republican President Theodore Roosevelt's federal government sued 45 companies, and William Taft used it against 75 companies. The Clayton Act of 1914 was passed to supplement the Sherman Act. Specific categories of abusive conduct were listed, including price discrimination(section 2), exclusive dealings (section 3) and mergers which substantially lessened competition (section 7). Section 6 exempted trade unions from the law's operation. Both the Sherman and Clayton Acts are now codified under Title 15 of the United States Code.

- United States v. Workingmen's Amalgamated Council, 54 Fed 994 (CCA 5th 1893)
- United States v. E. C. Knight Company, 156 U.S. 1 (1895)
- United States v. Trans-Missouri Freight Association, 166 U.S. 290 (1897)
- Northern Securities Co. v. United States, 193 U.S. 197 (1904)
- Loewe v. Lawlor, 208 U.S. 274 (1908)
- Duplex Printing Press Co. v. Deering, 254 U.S. 443 (1921)

=== Post war consensus ===
It was after the First World War that countries began to follow the United States' lead in competition policy. In 1923, Canada introduced the Combines Investigation Act and in 1926 France reinforced its basic competition provisions from the 1810 Code Napoleon. After World War II, the Allies, led by the United States, introduced tight regulation of cartels and monopolies in occupied Germany and Japan. In Germany, despite the existence of laws against unfair business practices and unfair competition passed in 1909 (Gesetz gegen den unlauteren Wettbewerb or UWG) it was widely believed that the predominance of large cartels of German industry had made it easier for the Nazis to assume total economic control simply by bribing or blackmailing the heads of a small number of industrial magnates. Similarly in Japan, where business was organised along family and nepotistic ties, the zaibatsu were easy for the government to manipulate into the war effort. Following World War II and the unconditional surrender of Japan and Germany, tighter controls, replicating the existing American policies and regulations were introduced.

However, further developments were considerably overshadowed by the move towards nationalisation and industry-wide planning in many countries. Making the economy and industry democratically accountable through direct government action became a priority. Coal industry, railroads, steel, electricity, water, health care and many other sectors were targeted for their special qualities of being natural monopolies. Commonwealth countries were slow in enacting statutory competition law provisions. The United Kingdom introduced the (considerably less stringent) Restrictive Practices Act in 1956. Australia introduced its current Trade Practices Act in 1974. Recently however there has been a wave of updates, especially in Europe to harmonise legislation with contemporary competition law thinking.

=== European Union law ===
In 1957 six Western European countries signed the Treaty of the European Community (EC Treaty or Treaty of Rome), which over the last fifty years has grown into a European Union of nearly half a billion citizens. The European Community is the name for the economic and social pillar of EU law, under which competition law falls. Healthy competition is seen as an essential element in the creation of a common market free from restraints on trade. The first provision is Article 81 EC, which deals with cartels and restrictive vertical agreements. Prohibited are...

"(1) ...all agreements between undertakings, decisions by associations of undertakings and concerted practices which may affect trade between Member States and which have as their object or effect the prevention, restriction or distortion of competition within the common market..."

Article 81(1) EC then gives examples of "hard core" restrictive practices such as price fixing or market sharing and 81(2) EC confirms that any agreements are automatically void. However, just like the Statute of Monopolies 1623, Article 81(3) EC creates exemptions, if the collusion is for distributional or technological innovation, gives consumers a "fair share" of the benefit and does not include unreasonable restraints (or disproportionate, in ECJ terminology) that risk eliminating competition anywhere. Article 82 EC deals with monopolies, or more precisely firms who have a dominant market share and abuse that position. Unlike U.S. Antitrust, EC law has never been used to punish the existence of dominant firms, but merely imposes a special responsibility to conduct oneself appropriately. Specific categories of abuse listed in Article 82 EC include price discrimination and exclusive dealing, much the same as sections 2 and 3 of the U.S. Clayton Act. Also under Article 82 EC, the Council of the European Union was empowered to enact a regulation to control mergers between firms, currently the latest known by the abbreviation of ECMR "Reg. 139/2004". The general test is whether a concentration (i.e. merger or acquisition) with a community dimension (i.e. affects a number of EU member states) might significantly impede effective competition. Again, the similarity to the Clayton Act's substantial lessening of competition. Finally, Articles 86 and 87 EC regulate the state's role in the market. Article 86(2) EC states clearly that nothing in the rules can be used to obstruct a member state's right to deliver public services, but that otherwise public enterprises must play by the same rules on collusion and abuse of dominance as everyone else. Article 87 EC, similar to Article 81 EC, lays down a general rule that the state may not aid or subsidise private parties in distortion of free competition, but then grants exceptions for things like charities, natural disasters or regional development.

=== International enforcement ===
Competition law has already been substantially internationalised along the lines of the US model by nation states themselves, however the involvement of international organisations has been growing. Increasingly active at all international conferences are the United Nations Conference on Trade and Development (UNCTAD) and the Organisation for Economic Co-operation and Development (OECD), which is prone to making neo-liberal recommendations about the total application of competition law for public and private industries. Chapter 5 of the post war Havana Charter contained an Antitrust code but this was never incorporated into the WTO's forerunner, the General Agreement on Tariffs and Trade 1947. Office of Fair Trading Director and Professor Richard Whish wrote sceptically that it "seems unlikely at the current stage of its development that the WTO will metamorphose into a global competition authority." Despite that, at the ongoing Doha round of trade talks for the World Trade Organization, discussion includes the prospect of competition law enforcement moving up to a global level. While it is incapable of enforcement itself, the newly established International Competition Network (ICN) is a way for national authorities to coordinate their own enforcement activities.

== See also ==
- Competition policy
- Collusive Actions Act 1488
- History of economic thought
- Unfair business practices
- Unfair competition
