= United Kingdom competition law =

United Kingdom competition law is affected by both British and European elements. The Competition Act 1998 and the Enterprise Act 2002 are the most important statutes for cases with a purely national dimension. However, prior to Brexit, if the effect of a business' conduct would reach across borders, the European Commission has competence to deal with the problems, and exclusively EU law would apply. Even so, the pre-Brexit section 60 of the Competition Act 1998 provides that UK rules are to be applied in line with European jurisprudence. Like all competition law, that in the UK has three main tasks.

- prohibiting agreements or practices that restrict free trading and competition between business entities. This includes in particular the repression of cartels.
- banning abusive behaviour by a firm dominating a market, or anti-competitive practices that tend to lead to such a dominant position. Practices controlled in this way may include predatory pricing, tying, price gouging, refusal to deal and many others.
- supervising the mergers and acquisitions of large corporations, including some joint ventures. Transactions that are considered to threaten the competitive process can be prohibited altogether, or approved subject to "remedies" such as an obligation to divest part of the merged business or to offer licences or access to facilities to enable other businesses to continue competing.

The Competition and Markets Authority enforces competition law on behalf of the public. It merged the Office of Fair Trading with the Competition Commission after the Enterprise and Regulatory Reform Act 2013 Part 3. Consumer welfare and the public interest are the main objective of competition law, including industrial policy, regional development, protection of the environment and the running of public services. Competition law is closely connected with law on deregulation of access to markets, state aids and subsidies, the privatisation of state owned assets and the establishment of independent sector regulators. Specific "watchdog" agencies such as Ofgem, Ofcom and Ofwat are charged with seeing how the operation of those specific markets work. The OFT and the Competition Commission's work is generally confined to the rest.

== History ==
Legislation in England to control monopolies and restrictive practices were in force well before the Norman Conquest. The Domesday Book recorded that "foresteel" (i.e. forestalling, the practice of buying up goods before they reach market and then inflating the prices) was one of three forfeitures that King Edward the Confessor could carry out through England. But concern for fair prices also led to attempts to directly regulate the market. Under Henry III an act was passed in 1266 to fix bread and ale prices in correspondence with corn prices laid down by the assizes. Penalties for breach included amercements, pillory and tumbrel. A fourteenth century statute labelled forestallers as "oppressors of the poor and the community at large and enemies of the whole country." Under King Edward III the Statute of Labourers of 1349 fixed wages of artificers and workmen and decreed that foodstuffs should be sold at reasonable prices. On top of existing penalties, the statute stated that overcharging merchants must pay the injured party double the sum he received, an idea that has been replicated in punitive treble damages under US antitrust law. Also under Edward III, the following statutory provision in the poetic language of the time outlawed trade combinations.

"...we have ordained and established, that no merchant or other shall make Confederacy, Conspiracy, Coin, Imagination, or Murmur, or Evil Device in any point that may turn to the Impeachment, Disturbance, Defeating or Decay of the said Staples, or of anything that to them pertaineth, or may pertain."

In 1553, King Henry VIII reintroduced tariffs for foodstuffs, designed to stabilise prices, in the face of fluctuations in supply from overseas. So the legislation read here that whereas,

"it is very hard and difficult to put certain prices to any such things... [it is necessary because] prices of such victuals be many times enhanced and raised by the Greedy Covetousness and Appetites of the Owners of such Victuals, by occasion of ingrossing and regrating the same, more than upon any reasonable or just ground or cause, to the great damage and impoverishing of the King's subjects."

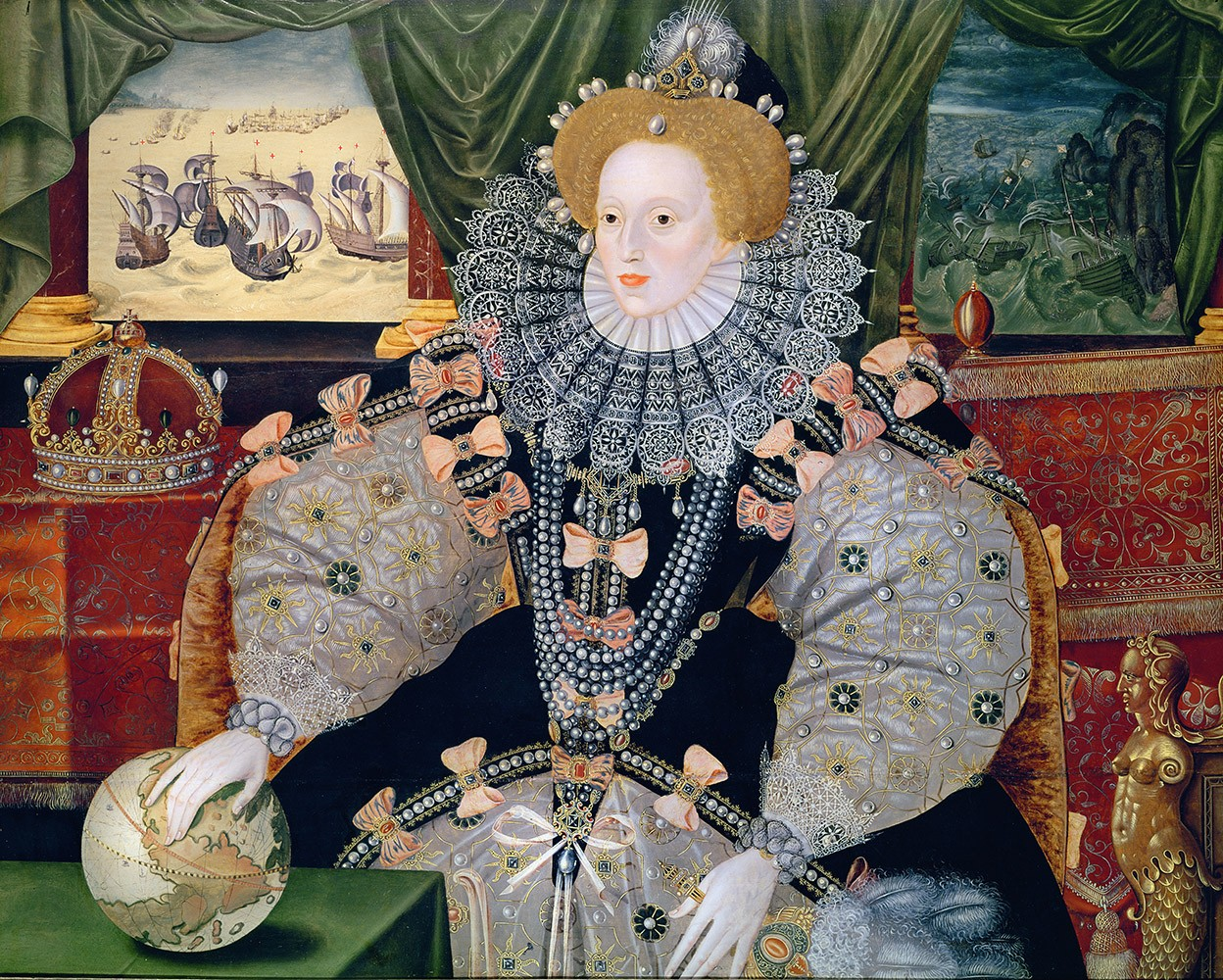
Elizabeth I assured monopolies would not be abused in the early era of globalisation.

Around this time organisations representing various tradesmen and handicraftspeople, known as guilds had been developing, and enjoyed many concessions and exemptions from the laws against monopolies. The privileges conferred were not abolished until the Municipal Corporations Act 1835. In 1561 a system of Industrial Monopoly Licences, similar to modern patents had been introduced into England. But by the reign of Queen Elizabeth I, the system was reputedly much abused and used merely to preserve privileges, encouraging nothing new in the way of innovation or manufacture. When a protest was made in the House of Commons and a Bill was introduced, the Queen convinced the protesters to challenge the case in the courts. This was the catalyst for the Case of Monopolies or Darcy v Allein. The plaintiff, an officer of the Queen's household, had been granted the sole right of making playing cards and claimed damages for the defendant's infringement of this right. The court found the grant void and that three characteristics of monopoly were (1) price increases; (2) quality decrease; and (3) the tendency to reduce artificers to idleness and beggary.

This put a temporary end to complaints about monopoly, until King James I began to grant them again. In 1623 Parliament passed the Statute of Monopolies, which for the most part excluded patent rights from its prohibitions, as well as guilds. From King Charles I, through the civil war and to King Charles II, monopolies continued, especially useful for raising revenue. Then in 1684, in East India Company v Sandys it was decided that exclusive rights to trade only outside the realm were legitimate, on the grounds that only large and powerful concerns could trade in the conditions prevailing overseas. In 1710 to deal with high coal prices caused by a Newcastle Coal Monopoly the New Law was passed. Its provisions stated that "all and every contract or contracts, Covenants and Agreements, whether the same be in writing or not in writing... are hereby declared to be illegal." When Adam Smith wrote the Wealth of Nations in 1776 he was somewhat cynical of the possibility for change.

"To expect indeed that freedom of trade should ever be entirely restored in Great Britain is as absurd as to expect that Oceana or Utopia should ever be established in it. Not only the prejudices of the public, but what is more unconquerable, the private interests of many individuals irresistibly oppose it. The Member of Parliament who supports any proposal for strengthening this Monopoly is seen to acquire not only the reputation for understanding trade, but great popularity and influence with an order of men whose members and wealth render them of great importance."

=== Classical trade theory ===
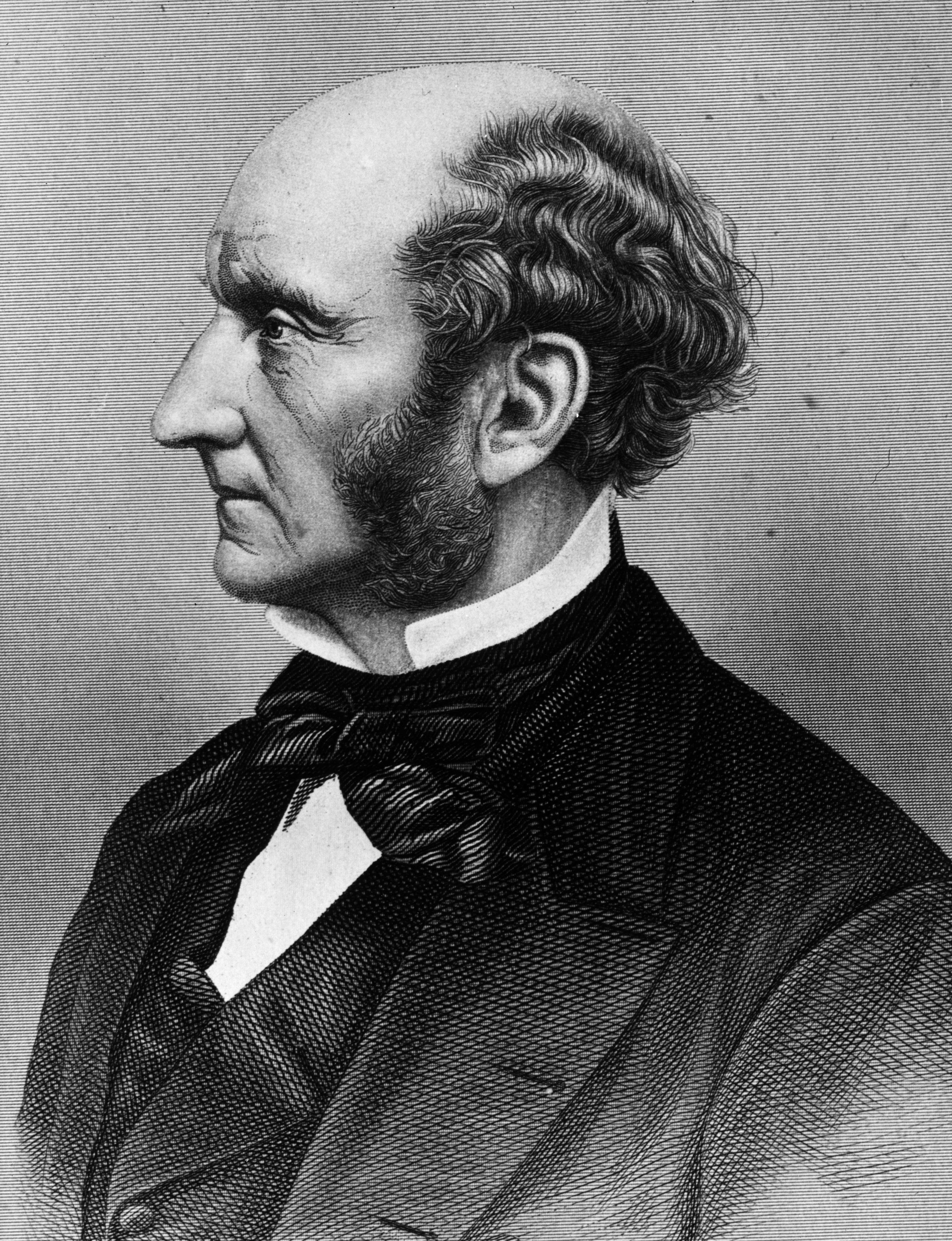
John Stuart Mill believed the restraint of trade doctrine was justified to preserve liberty and competition.

The classical British perspective on competition was that certain agreements and business practice could be an unreasonable restraint on the individual liberty of tradespeople to carry on their livelihoods. Restraints were judged as permissible or not by courts as new cases appeared and in the light of changing business circumstances. Hence the courts found specific categories of agreement, specific clauses, to fall foul of their doctrine on economic fairness, and they did not contrive an overarching conception of market power. Adam Smith rejected any monopoly power on this basis.

"A monopoly granted either to an individual or to a trading company has the same effect as a secret in trade or manufactures. The monopolists, by keeping the market constantly under-stocked, by never fully supplying the effectual demand, sell their commodities much above the natural price, and raise their emoluments, whether they consist in wages or profit, greatly above their natural rate."

In The Wealth of Nations (1776), Adam Smith also pointed out the cartel problem, but did not advocate legal measures to combat them.

"People of the same trade seldom meet together, even for merriment and diversion, but the conversation ends in a conspiracy against the public, or in some contrivance to raise prices. It is impossible indeed to prevent such meetings, by any law which either could be executed, or would be consistent with liberty and justice. But though the law cannot hinder people of the same trade from sometimes assembling together, it ought to do nothing to facilitate such assemblies; much less to render them necessary."

Smith also rejected the very existence of, not just dominant and abusive corporations, but corporations at all.

By the latter half of the nineteenth century, it had become clear that large firms had become a fact of the market economy. John Stuart Mill's approach was laid down in his treatise On Liberty (1859).

"Again, trade is a social act. Whoever undertakes to sell any description of goods to the public, does what affects the interest of other persons, and of society in general; and thus his conduct, in principle, comes within the jurisdiction of society... both the cheapness and the good quality of commodities are most effectually provided for by leaving the producers and sellers perfectly free, under the sole check of equal freedom to the buyers for supplying themselves elsewhere. This is the so-called doctrine of Free Trade, which rests on grounds different from, though equally solid with, the principle of individual liberty asserted in this Essay. Restrictions on trade, or on production for purposes of trade, are indeed restraints; and all restraint, qua restraint, is an evil..."

=== Restraint of trade ===
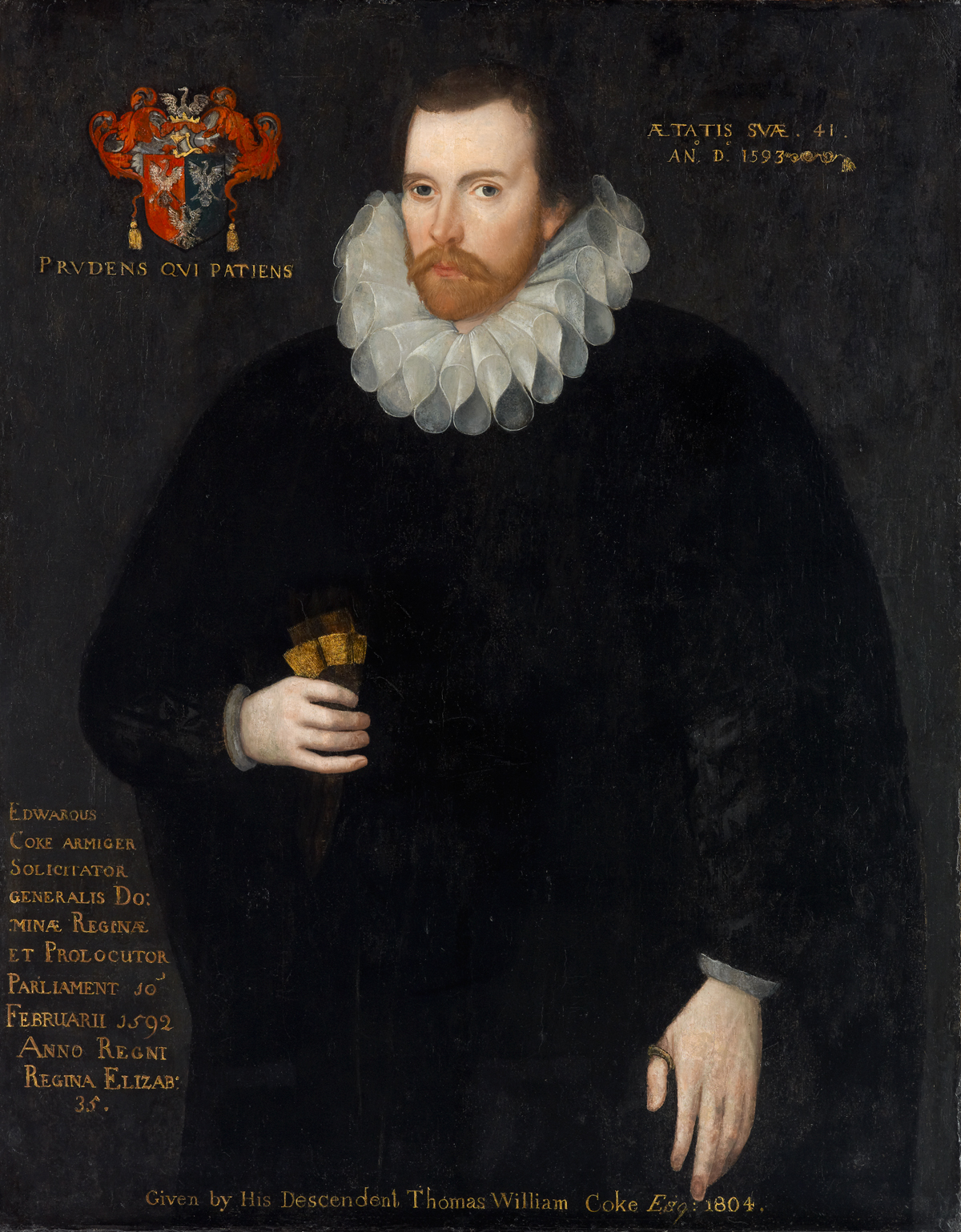
The 17th-century judge Edward Coke thought that general restraints on trade were unreasonable.

The English law of restraint of trade is the direct predecessor to modern competition law. Its current use is small, given modern and economically oriented statutes in most common law countries. Its approach was based on the two concepts of prohibiting agreements that ran counter to public policy, unless the reasonableness of an agreement could be shown. A restraint of trade is simply some kind of agreed provision that is designed to restrain another's trade. For example, in Nordenfelt v Maxim, Nordenfelt Gun Co a Swedish arm inventor promised on sale of his business to an American gun maker that he "would not make guns or ammunition anywhere in the world, and would not compete with Maxim in any way."

To be considered whether or not there is a restraint of trade in the first place, both parties must have provided valuable consideration for their agreement. In Dyer's case a dyer had given a bond not to exercise his trade in the same town as the plaintiff for six months but the plaintiff had promised nothing in return. On hearing the plaintiff's attempt to enforce this restraint, Hull J exclaimed,

"per Dieu, if the plaintiff were here, he should go to prison until he had paid a fine to the King."

The common law has evolved to reflect changing business conditions. So in the 1613 case of Rogers v Parry a court held that a joiner who promised not to trade from his house for 21 years could have this bond enforced against him since the time and place was certain. It was also held that a man cannot bind himself to not use his trade generally by Chief Justice Coke. This was followed in Broad v Jolyffe and Mitchell v Reynolds where Lord Macclesfield asked, "What does it signify to a tradesman in London what another does in Newcastle?" In times of such slow communications, commerce around the country it seemed axiomatic that a general restraint served no legitimate purpose for one's business and ought to be void. But already in 1880 in Roussillon v Roussillon Lord Justice Fry stated that a restraint unlimited in space need not be void, since the real question was whether it went further than necessary for the promisee's protection. So in the Nordenfelt case Lord McNaughton ruled that while one could validly promise to "not make guns or ammunition anywhere in the world" it was an unreasonable restraint to "not compete with Maxim in any way." This approach in England was confirmed by the House of Lords in Mason v The Provident Supply and Clothing Co

=== Twentieth-century change ===
In 1948, Chancellor of the Exchequer Sir Stafford Cripps was responsible for Britain's first Act resembling modern competition law.

Modern competition law is heavily influenced by the American experience. The so-called Sherman Act of 1890 and the Clayton Act of 1914 (in the US they often name legislation after the people who propose it) were passed by Presidents concerned about the threat of big business to the power of the government. It was originally used to break up the "trust" arrangements, big company groups with intricate power sharing schemes. This is where their word "antitrust" comes from. The legislation was modelled on the restraint of trade doctrine they had inherited from English law. After the Second World War the American version of competition policy was imposed on Germany and Japan. It was thought that one of the ways Hitler and the Emperor had been able to assume such absolute power was simply by bribing or coercing the relatively small numbers of big cartel and zaibatsu chiefs into submission. Economic control meant political supremacy, and competition policy was necessary to destroy it. Under the Treaty of Rome, which founded the European Economic Community, competition laws were inserted. The American jurisprudence was naturally influential, as the European Court of Justice interpreted the relevant provisions (now Article 81 and Article 82) through its own developing body of case law.

In the meantime, Britain's own approach moved slowly, and saw no urgency for a similar competition law regime. The common law continued to serve its purpose, and debate about economic policy had become radically different after the First World War. A number of key industries had been nationalised, and the new Labour Party was committed to a socialist economic agenda: progressive democratic ownership of the means of production. In other words, the debate about economic policy was being had on a totally different level. Controlling private industry from arms length regulatory mechanisms was neither here nor there. After the second world war, this case was strengthened, yet Clement Attlee's Labour government did introduce the Monopolies and Restrictive Practices (Inquiry and Control) Act 1948. Far more limited than the Americanesque versions, this was updated in 1953. The Restrictive Trade Practices Act 1956 made it illegal for manufacturers to act in collusion to jointly maintain resale prices for their products to consumers. Later came the Monopolies and Mergers Act 1965 and the Monopolies And Restrictive Trade Practices Act 1969.

== European Union law ==
The United Kingdom joined the European Community (EC) with the European Community Act 1972, and through that became subject to EC competition law. Since the Maastricht Treaty of 1992, the EC was renamed the European Union (EU). Competition law falls under the social and economic pillar of the treaties. After the introduction of the Treaty of Lisbon the pillar structure was abandoned and competition law was subsumed in the Treaty on the Functioning of the European Union (TFEU). So where a British company is carrying out unfair business practices, is involved in a cartel or is attempting to merge in a way which would disrupt competition across UK borders, the Commission of the European Union will have enforcement powers and exclusively EU law will apply. The first provision is Article 101 TFEU, which deals with cartels and restrictive vertical agreements. Prohibited are...

"(1) ...all agreements between undertakings, decisions by associations of undertakings and concerted practices which may affect trade between Member States and which have as their object or effect the prevention, restriction or distortion of competition within the common market..."

Article 101(1) TFEU then gives examples of "hard core" restrictive practices such as price fixing or market sharing and 101(2) TFEU confirms that any agreements are automatically void. However, just like the Statute of Monopolies 1623, Article 101(3) TFEU creates exemptions, if the collusion is for distributional or technological innovation, gives consumers a "fair share" of the benefit and does not include unreasonable restraints (or disproportionate, in ECJ terminology) that risk eliminating competition anywhere. Article 102 TFEU deals with monopolies, or more precisely firms who have a dominant market share and abuse that position. Unlike US Antitrust, EU law has never been used to punish the existence of dominant firms, but merely imposes a special responsibility to conduct oneself appropriately. Specific categories of abuse listed in Article 102 EC include price discrimination and exclusive dealing, much the same as sections 2 and 3 of the US Clayton Act. Also under Article 102 EC, the European Council was empowered to enact a regulation to control mergers between firms, currently the latest known by the abbreviation of ECMR "Reg. 139/2004". The general test is whether a concentration (i.e. merger or acquisition) with a community dimension (i.e. affects a number of EU member states) might significantly impede effective competition. Again, the similarity to the Clayton Act's substantial lessening of competition. Finally, Articles 106 and 107 TFEU regulate the state's role in the market. Article 106(2) EC states clearly that nothing in the rules cannot be used to obstruct a member state's right to deliver public services, but that otherwise public enterprises must play by the same rules on collusion and abuse of dominance as everyone else. Article 107 TFEU, similar to Article 101 TFEU, lays down a general rule that the state may not aid or subsidise private parties in distortion of free competition, but then grants exceptions for things like charities, natural disasters or regional development.

== Network regulation ==
- Postal Services Act 2000 and Postal Services Commission. See also Postal Services in the United Kingdom.
- Communications Act 2003 and Ofcom. See also, Telecommunications in the United Kingdom and Public service broadcasting in the United Kingdom
- Gas Act 1986, Electricity Act 1989, Utilities Act 2000, Energy Act 2004 and Ofgem. See also, Energy policy of the United Kingdom
- Water Act 2003 and Ofwat
- Railways and Transport Safety Act 2003 and Office of Rail & Road

== See also ==
- Competition policy
- Consumer protection
- SSNIP
- Relevant market
- European Community competition law
- Irish Competition law
- Resale price maintenance
- Attorney General v. Edison Telephone Co of London Ltd (1880–81) LR 6 QBD 244
- Public service law in the United Kingdom
- British Sky Broadcasting Group plc v The Competition Commission [2010] EWCA Civ 2
