= Statute of Artificers 1562 =

Act of the Parliament of England

Statute of Artificers 1563
- Act of Parliament
- Parliament of England
- Long title: An Act containing divers Orders for Artificers, Labourers, Servants of Husbandry, and Apprentices.
- Citation: 5 Eliz. 1. c. 4
- Territorial extent: England and Wales

Dates
- Royal assent: 10 April 1563
- Commencement: 1 October 1563 (Note: Section 1.)
- Repealed: 1 September 1875
Other legislation
Amended by	Woollen Manufacture Act 1809; Offences Against the Person Act 1828; Criminal Law (India) Act 1828
Repealed by	Conspiracy and Protection of Property Act 1875
Relates to	Ordinance of Labourers; Statute of Labourers 1351

Status: Repealed

Text of statute as originally enacted

The Statute of Artificers 1563 or the Artificers and Apprentices Act 1563 (5 Eliz. 1. c. 4), also known as the Statute of Labourers 1562, was an act of the Parliament of England, under Queen Elizabeth I, which sought to fix prices, impose maximum wages, restrict workers' freedom of movement and regulate training. The causes of the measures were short-term labour shortages due to mortality from epidemic disease, as well as, inflation, poverty, and general social disorder. Local magistrates had responsibility for regulating wages in agriculture. Guilds in England regulated wages of the urban trades. Effectively, it transferred to the newly forming English state the functions previously held by the feudal craft guilds. The measure sought to make agriculture a trade and a national priority of employment.

== Content and case law ==
The act controlled entry into the class of skilled workmen by providing a compulsory seven years' apprenticeship, reserved the superior trades for the sons of the better off, empowered justices to require unemployed artificers to work in husbandry, required permission for a workman to transfer from one employer to another and empowered justices to fix wage rates for virtually all classes of workmen.

Section 15 of the act required justices at general sessions to set a yearly wage assessment ‘respecting the plenty or scarcity of the time’, covering ‘so many of the said artificers, handicraftsmen, husbandmen or any other labourer, servant or workman, whose wages in time past hath been by any law or statute rated and appointed, as also the wages of all other labourers, artificers, workmen or apprentices of husbandry, which have not been rated as they [the justices] … shall think meet by their directions to be rated...’ Sections 18-19 provided that if employers and workers agreed wages above the set rates, they could be imprisoned.

- Hobbs v Young (1689) 1 Show KB 266, Holt CJ, on apprentices under the 1562 Statute

Trades that were not yet in existence when the statute was enacted were considered outside its scope.

== Legacy ==
The Select Committee on Temporary Laws and Courtenay Ilbert described the act as one of the first Consolidation Acts, as the preamble of the act gave reasons for the expediency of consolidation.

The act was abolished by the Wages, etc., of Artificers, etc. Act 1813 (53 Geo. 3. c. 40), as enlightened thought challenged existing notions of 'privilege'. This development was one of a series of initiatives that the British Parliament undertook to support the vastly changed economic climate of the nineteenth century.

The whole act was repealed by section 17 of the Combinations of Workmen Act 1825 (6 Geo. 4. c. 129).

== See also ==
- UK labour law
- Labour law
- History of competition law
- Ordinance of Labourers 1349 and Statute of Labourers 1351, which after the Black Death fixed maximum wages of peasantry.

== Bibliography ==
- Deakin, S. F.; Wilkinson, Frank (2005). The law of the labour market: industrialization, employment, and legal evolution. Oxford monographs on labour law. Oxford; New York: Oxford University Press. ISBN 978-0-19-815281-1.
- Woodward, Donald (1980). "The Background to the Statute of Artificers: The Genesis of Labour Policy, 1558-63". The Economic History Review. 33 (1): 32–44. doi:10.2307/2595542. ISSN 0013-0117. JSTOR 2595542.
