= Non-compete clause =

Term in contract law where a person agrees not to compete

In contract law, a non-compete clause (often NCC), restrictive covenant, or covenant not to compete (CNC), is a clause under which one party (usually an employee) agrees not to enter into or start a similar profession or trade in competition against another party (usually the employer). In the labor market, these agreements prevent workers from freely moving across employers, and weaken the bargaining leverage of workers.

Non-compete agreements are rooted in the medieval system of apprenticeship whereby an older master craftsman took on a younger apprentice, trained the apprentice, and in some cases entered into an agreement whereby the apprentice could not compete with the master after the apprenticeship. Modern uses of non-compete agreements are generally premised on preventing high-skilled workers from transferring trade secrets or a customer list from one firm to a competing firm, thus giving the competing firm a competitive advantage. However, many non-compete clauses apply to low-wage workers or individuals who do not possess transferable trade secrets.

The extent to which non-compete clauses are legally allowed and enforced varies under different jurisdictions. Some localities and states ban non-compete clauses or highly restrict their applicability. In jurisdictions where non-compete agreements are legal, courts tend to evaluate whether a non-compete agreement covers a worker's move to a relevant industry and reasonable geographic area, as well as whether the former is still bound by the agreement over a reasonable time period. An employer bringing a lawsuit may also be asked to identify a protectable business interest that was harmed by the employee's move to a different firm.

Research shows that non-compete agreements make labor markets less competitive, reduce wages and reduce labor mobility. While non-compete agreements may incentivize company investment into their workers and research, they may also reduce innovation and productivity by employees who may be forced to leave a sector when they leave a firm. The labor movement tends to advocate for restrictions on non-compete agreements while support for non-compete agreements is common among some employers and business associations.

== History ==
As far back as Dyer's Case in 1414, English common law chose not to enforce non-compete agreements because of their nature as restraints on trade. That ban remained unchanged until 1621, when a restriction that was limited to a specific geographic location was found to be an enforceable exception to the previously absolute rule. Almost a hundred years later, the exception became the rule with the 1711 watershed case of Mitchel v Reynolds which established the modern framework for the analysis of the enforceability of non-compete agreements.

Traditionally, non-competes were used to prevent high-skilled workers from transferring trade secrets or a customer list from one firm to a competing firm. However, such clauses can frequently be found in the contracts of low-wage workers and other workers who are unlikely to be in a position to share trade secrets.

When courts consider the enforceability of non-compete agreements, they usually ask the employer to identify a protectable business interest that was harmed by the employee's move to a different firm. Courts consider whether the non-compete covers a relevant industry (does the worker do work for a firm in the same industry?), reasonable geographic area, and reasonable time period.

University of Chicago Law School Professor Eric A. Posner has argued that since non-competes have an adverse impact on competition, they should be covered under a strong anti-trust regime, and the "law should treat noncompetes as presumptively illegal, allowing employers to rebut the presumption if they can prove that the noncompetes they use will benefit rather than harm their workers."

In April, 2024, the Federal Trade Commission (FTC) banned all non compete agreements in the United States. Within a few days, business groups including the U.S. Chamber of Commerce sued to block the new rule.

== Impact ==
Studies show that non-compete agreements make labor markets less competitive, reduce wages and reduce labor mobility. Existing evidence suggests that the wage suppressing effects of non-competes are disproportionately concentrated on lower-income workers. Non-compete agreements can incentivize firms to increase investment into worker training and research, as those workers are less likely to leave the firm. Non-competes may reduce overall hiring costs and employee turnover for companies, which may result in savings that could in theory be passed on to customers in the form of lower prices and to investors as higher returns.

Non-competes are more common for technical, high-wage workers and more likely to be enforced for those workers. However, even when non-compete agreements are unlikely to be enforced (such as for individual low-wage workers or in states that do not enforce these agreements), the agreements may still have an intimidating impact on those workers.

A 2021 study of the U.S. health care sector from 1996–2007 found that noncompete agreements in this sector led to higher prices for physicians, smaller medical practices and greater medical firm concentration.

A 2021 study found that noncompete agreements for low-wage workers have been shown to lower wages; a study determined that the 2008 Oregon ban on noncompete agreements for workers paid by the hour "increased hourly wages by 2%–3% on average." The study also showed that the Oregon ban on noncompete agreements for low-wage workers "improved average occupational status in Oregon, raised job-to-job mobility, and increased the proportion of salaried workers without affecting hours worked."

Studies have found that non-compete agreements can prompt technical workers to involuntarily leave their technical field to avoid a potential lawsuit from their former employer. For this reason, non-compete agreements have been linked to less innovation and lower productivity as inventors switch fields in order to avoid violating non-competes.

== By country ==
Enforceability of non-competes by country Non-competes unenforceable Non-competes only enforceable for managerial positions Monetary compensation required for non-compete period (usually 25-50% of previous salary) Time limit on non-compete duration Minimum income threshold for non-competes Must be "reasonable", decided on case-on-case basis

=== Belgium ===
In Belgium, CNCs are restricted to new employments within Belgium and for no more than one year. The employer must pay financial compensation for the duration of the CNC, amounting at least half of the gross salary for the corresponding period.

=== Canada ===
Canadian courts will enforce non-competition and non-solicitation agreements; however, the agreement must be limited in time frame, business scope, and geographic scope to what is reasonably required to protect the company's proprietary rights, such as confidential marketing information or client relations and the scope of the agreement must be unambiguously defined. The 2009 Supreme Court of Canada case Shafron v. KRG Insurance Brokers (Western) Inc. 2009 SCC 6 held a non-compete agreement to be invalid due to the term "Metropolitan City of Vancouver" not being legally defined.

In 2021, employees in Ontario may no longer enter into non-compete agreements. There are exceptions for when a business is sold, and for chief officers (such as CEOs, CFOs, etc.).

=== France ===
In France, CNCs must be limited in time to a maximum of two years and to a region where the employee's new work can reasonably be seen as competitive. The region can be a city or the whole country, depending on the circumstances. The employer must pay financial compensation, typically 30 percent of the previous salary. A CNC may not unreasonably limit the possibilities of the employee to find new employment.

=== Germany ===
In Germany, CNCs are allowed for a term up to two years. The employer must provide financial compensation for the duration of the CNC amounting to at least half the gross salary. Unreasonable clauses – for example, excluding similar jobs throughout the whole of Germany – can be invalidated. In a 2023 decision (Higher Regional Court of Cologne, 18 U 29/23), the court ruled that a post-contractual non-compete clause imposed on a former managing director was invalid under §138 of the German Civil Code (BGB), in conjunction with Articles 2 and 12 of the Basic Law (GG). The clause was deemed excessively broad, as it prohibited the individual from working in any capacity for any competing company, regardless of whether the role was actually related to their previous position. The court found no legitimate business interest justifying such a wide restriction and held that the clause’s intent appeared to be the elimination of a potential competitor, which is not permissible. Attempts to salvage the clause through a severability clause or validity-preserving reduction were rejected, with the court emphasizing that overly broad and immoral restrictions cannot be judicially rewritten. Interim relief was granted to allow the claimant to begin a new role, recognizing the urgency and the potential infringement of her right to professional freedom.

=== India ===
Section 27 of the Indian Contract Act has a general bar on any agreement that puts a restriction on trade. The Supreme Court of India has clarified that some non-compete clauses—specifically, those backed by a clear objective that is considered to be in advantage of trade and commerce—are not barred by Section 27 of the Contract Act, and therefore valid in India.

=== Italy ===
Non-compete agreements are prevalent in Italy. In Italy, CNCs are regulated by articles 2125, 2596, and 1751 bis of the civil code.

=== Netherlands ===
In the Netherlands, non-compete clauses (non-concurrentiebeding or concurrentiebeding) are allowed regarding issues such as moving to a new employer and approaching customers of the old company. Unreasonable clauses can be invalidated in court.

=== Pakistan ===
According to Section 27 of the Contract Act, 1872, any agreement that restrains a person from exercising a lawful profession, trade or business is void. However, courts of Pakistan have made decisions in the past in favour of such restrictive clauses given that the restrictions are "reasonable". The definition of "reasonable" depends on the time-period, geographical location and the designation of employee. In the case of Exide Pakistan Limited vs. Abdul Wadood, 2008 CLD 1258 (Karachi), the High Court of Sindh stated that reasonableness of the clause will vary from case to case and depends mainly on duration and extent of geographical territory

=== Portugal ===
In Portugal, CNCs are regulated by article 136 of the labor code and restricted to two years extendible to three years in cases of access to particularly sensitive information. The employer must pay financial compensation for the duration of the CNC, but the law does not specify anything regarding the amount of the compensation.

=== Romania ===
In Romania, CNCs are regulated by articles 21–24 of the labor code and restricted to two years. The employer must pay financial compensation for the duration of the CNC, amounting to at least 50 percent of the last 6 months salary.

=== Spain ===
In Spain, CNCs are regulated by article 21 of the labor law. CNCs are allowed up to two years for technical professions and six months for other professions, given that adequate compensation is given.

=== United Kingdom ===
In the United Kingdom, CNCs are often called restraint of trade or restrictive covenant clauses, and may be used only if the employer can prove a legitimate business interest to protect in entering the clause into the contract. Mere competition will not amount to a legitimate business interest. The UK's regulator, the Competition and Markets Authority, advises that non-compete clauses are a form of employer collusion and are a form of a business cartel.

Restrictions are normally limited in duration, geographical area (an "area covenant"), and content.

In the Crown dependencies, many financial and other institutions require employees to sign 10-year or longer CNCs which could be seen to apply even if they leave the country or enter an unrelated field of work.

In May 2023, the UK Government announced plans to limit non-compete clauses to a maximum of three months.

=== United States ===
==== Prevalence and status ====
The majority of American states recognize and enforce various forms of non-compete agreements. A few states, such as California, North Dakota, and Oklahoma, totally ban noncompete agreements for employees, or prohibit all noncompete agreements except in limited circumstances.

Data from 2018 indicates that non-compete clauses cover 18 percent of American labor force participants. A 2023 petition to the FTC to ban non-compete agreements estimated that about 30 million workers (about 20% of all U.S. workers) were subject to a noncompete clause. While higher-wage workers are comparatively more likely to be covered by non-compete clauses, non-competes covered 14 percent of workers without college degrees in 2018. By some estimates, nearly half of all technical workers are covered by non-compete agreements.

==== Federal law ====
In March 2019, Democratic officials, labor unions, and workers' advocacy groups urged the U.S. FTC to ban non-compete clauses. A petition to the FTC, seeking a ban on noncompete clauses, was submitted by the AFL-CIO, SEIU, and Public Citizen. In July 2021, President Joe Biden signed Executive Order 14036, directing the FTC (whose chair, Lina Khan, he had recently appointed), as well as other federal agencies, to "curtail the unfair use of non-compete clauses and other clauses or agreements that may unfairly limit worker mobility". On January 5, 2023, the FTC proposed a rule banning non-compete agreements.

The U.S. Chamber of Commerce has lobbied against bans on non-compete agreements; in 2023, it threatened to sue the FTC if it bans non-compete agreements. The Chamber argued that "noncompete agreements are an important tool in fostering innovation and preserving competition".

== Related restrictive covenants ==
While CNCs are one of the most common types of restrictive covenants, there are many others. Each serves a specific purpose and provides specific rights and remedies. The most common types of restrictive covenants are as follows:

- Garden-leave clause: a type of CNC by which an employee is compensated during the period that the employee is restricted.
- Forfeiture-for-competition agreement and compensation-for-competition agreement: an agreement by which an employee either forfeits certain benefits or pays some amount of money to engage in activities that are competitive with his former employer.
- Forfeiture agreement: an agreement by which an employee forfeits benefits when his employment terminates, regardless of whether he engages in competitive activities.
- Nondisclosure/confidentiality agreement: an agreement by which a party agrees not to use or disclose the other party's confidential information.
- Non-solicitation agreement: an agreement by which an employee agrees not to solicit and/or not to accept business from the employer's customers.
- Antipiracy agreement: an agreement by which an employee agrees not to solicit and/or not to hire the employer's employees.
- Invention assignment agreement: an agreement by which an employee assigns to the employer any potential inventions conceived of during employment.

The enforceability of these agreements depends on the law of the particular state. As a general rule, however, with the exception of invention assignment agreements, they are subject to the same analysis as other CNCs.

No-poaching agreements between employers are typically considered illegal anti-competitive collusion. (See for example High-Tech Employee Antitrust Litigation concerning Silicon Valley employers in the 2000s.)
