= Non-solicitation =

Term in contract and employment law

Non-solicitation, in contract law, refers to an agreement, typically between an employer and employee, that prohibits an employee from utilizing the company's clients, customers and contact lists for personal gain upon leaving the company.

== Non-solicitation agreements ==
Non-solicitation agreement provisions—alongside the non-compete clause (NCC) and the non-disclosure agreement (NDA)—constitute one of three restrictive covenants frequently found within a business contract. They may be entered into with both employees and independent contractors—in addition to multiple entities—as part of a larger general contract or as a standalone provision.

=== Restrictions ===
Non-solicitation agreements are restricted by convention, jurisdiction, and terms of scope. Furthermore, enforceability has proven difficult and, in certain instances, has been deemed "very subjective".

==== Restraint of Trade ====
A non-solicitation agreement that is too widely construed may violate standards of "reasonableness" (decided on a case-by-case basis). Under common law, an overreaching agreement would be deemed a restraint of trade and thus be deemed invalid.

== Jurisdictional variations ==
Non-solicitation agreements are restricted in certain jurisdictions, notably California, which prohibits such agreements for all circumstances other than the protection of company trade secrets in all but several exceptions, a decision upheld by the State Supreme Court in 2008.

In Canada, non-solicitation agreements came under restrictive scrutiny in 2016, when the Alberta Court of Queen's Bench considered the issue in Specialized Property Evaluation Control Services Ltd. V. Les Evaluations Marc Bourret Appraisals Inc. The court found that wrongfully dismissed employees are excused from enforceability both of non-solicitation and non-compete agreements, in addition to finding both agreements unenforceable unless they are reasonable and in the public interest.

In the United Kingdom, in the case of Safetynet Security Ltd. v Leonard Coppage and Freedom Security Solutions Ltd., the court held that an employment contract clause preventing an individual from contacting any former customers for six months after leaving the company "had clearly been agreed to by him throughout his contract and was reasonable and enforceable".
