= Darcy v Allein =

Landmark English case against monopolies

Case of Monopolies
- Court: Queen's Bench
- Full case name: Edward Darcy, Esquire v Thomas Allin, London Haberdasher
- Decided: Trinity Term, 1602
- Citations: EngR 398; 11 Co Rep 84; 77 ER 1260; Noy 173; Moore KB 671; 1 Web Pat Cas 1; 74 ER 1131; 77 Eng Rep 1260

Court membership
- Judge sitting: John Popham CJ

Keywords
- Letters patent

Edward Darcy Esquire v Thomas Allin of London Haberdasher (1602) 74 ER 1131 (also spelt as "Allain" or "Allen" and "Allein" but most widely known as the Case of Monopolies), was an early landmark case in English law, establishing that the grant of exclusive rights to produce any article was improper (monopoly). The reasoning behind the outcome of the case, which was decided at a time before courts regularly issued written opinions, was reported by Sir Edward Coke.

== Facts ==
The plaintiff, Edward Darcy, a Groom of the Chamber in the court of Queen Elizabeth, received from the Queen a license to import and sell all playing cards to be marketed in England. This arrangement was apparently secured in part by the Queen's concern that card-playing was becoming a problem among her subjects and that having one person control the trade would regulate the activity. When the defendant, Thomas Allin, a member of the Worshipful Company of Haberdashers, sought to make and sell his own playing cards, Darcy sued, bringing an action on the case for damages.

== Judgment ==
The Queen's Bench court delivered judgment for the defendant, resolving that the Queen's grant of a monopoly was invalid, for several reasons:

1. Such a monopoly prevents persons who may be skilled in a trade from practicing their trade, and therefore promotes idleness.
2. Grant of a monopoly damages not only tradesmen in that field, but everyone who wants to use the product, because the monopolist will raise the price, but will have no incentive to maintain the quality of the goods sold.
3. The Queen intended to permit this monopoly for the public good, but she must have been deceived because such a monopoly can be used only for the private gain of the monopolist.
4. It would set a dangerous precedent to allow a trade to be monopolized – particularly because the person being granted the monopoly in this case knew nothing about making cards himself, and where there was no law that permitted the creation of such a monopoly.

== Significance ==
Darcy v Allin was the first definitive statement by a court that state-established monopolies are inherently harmful and therefore contrary to law. The case has since come to be known as The Case of Monopolies, and the arguments set forth therein have served as the basis for modern antitrust and competition law. It drew considerably on historical evidence of rulers' antipathy to monopolies, as follows.

For we read in Justinian that monopolies are not to be meddled with, because they do not conduce to the benefit of the common weal but to its ruin and damage. The civil Laws forbid monopolies: in the chapter of monopolies, one and the same Law. The Emperor Zeno ordained that those practicing monopolies should be deprived of all their goods. Zeno added that even imperial Prescripts were not to be accepted if they granted monopolies to anyone.

== See also ==
- United Kingdom competition law
- Competition law
- Restraint of trade
