= Statute of Labourers 1351 =

English wage control law

- Act of Parliament
- Parliament of England
- Citation: 25 Edw. 3. Stat. 2 (Note: This is the citation in The Statutes of the Realm.); 25 Edw. 3. Stat. 1 (Note: This is the citation in The Statutes at Large.)
- Territorial extent: England and Wales; Ireland

Dates
- Royal assent: 1351
- Commencement: 9 February 1351 (Note: Start of session.)
- Repealed: England and Wales: 28 July 1863; Ireland: 10 August 1872
Other legislation
Repealed by	England and Wales: Statute Law Revision Act 1863; Ireland: Statute Law (Ireland) Revision Act 1872
Relates to	Ordinance of Labourers 1349; Apprentices Act 1536; Statute of Artificers 1562; Statute of Labourers 1603; Combination Act 1800

Status: Repealed

Text of statute as originally enacted

The Statute of Labourers (25 Edw. 3. Stat. 2) was an act of the Parliament of England under King Edward III in 1351 in response to a labour shortage, which aimed at regulating the labour force by prohibiting requesting or offering a wage higher than pre-Plague standards and limiting movement in search of better conditions. The popular narrative about its success and enforcement holds that it was poorly enforced and did not stop the rise in real wages. However, immediately after the Black Death, real wages did not rise, despite the labour shortage.

== Background ==
The Black Death, a pandemic of bubonic plague, killed more than one-third of the population of Europe and 30–40% of the population in Britain and caused a dramatic decrease in the supply of labour. Landowners suddenly faced a sharp increase in competition from workers to work for them. Labourers had increased bargaining power and commanded higher wages. The increase in labour cost also led to inflation throughout the economy. The elite class lamented the sudden shift in economic power. In an attempt to control labour costs and price levels, Edward III issued the Ordinance of Labourers 1349 (23 Edw. 3). Parliament attempted to reinforce the Ordinance with the Statute of Labourers. It was one of the causes, among others, of the Peasants' Revolt in 1381.

== Content ==
The statute set a maximum wage for labourers that was commensurate with wages paid before the Black Death, specifically, in the year 1346. It also mandated that able-bodied men and women should work and imposed harsh penalties for those who remained idle.

It required:

That every person, able in body and under the age of 68 years, not having enough to live upon, being required, shall be bound to serve him that doth require him, or else be committed to gaol until he shall find surety to serve, and that the old wages shall be given and no more; whereas lately it was ordained by our lord king and by the assent of the prelates, earls, barons and others of his council, against the malice of servants who were idle and not willing to serve after the AM pestilence without excessive wages, that such manner of servants, men as well as women, should be bound to serve, receiving the customary salary and wages in the places where they are bound to serve in the twentieth year of the reign (Note: The 20th year of the reign of Edward III was 1347.) of the king that now is, or five or six years before, and that the same servants refusing to serve in such a manner should be punished by imprisonment of their bodies, as is more plainly contained in the said statute. Whereupon commissions were made to diverse people in every county to enquire and punish all those who offend against the same. And now for as much as it is given to the king to understand in the present parliament by the petition of the commons that the servants having no regard to the ordinance but to their ease and singular covetousness, do withdraw themselves from serving great men and others, unless they have livery and wages double or treble of what they were wont to take in the twentieth year and earlier, to the great damage of the great men and impoverishment of all the commonality; whereof the commonality prays remedy. Wherefore in the parliament by the assent of the prelates, earls, barons, and those of the commonality assembled there, in order to refrain the malice of the servants, there are ordained and established the underwritten articles.

Item that carters, ploughmen, drivers of ploughs, shepherds, swineherds, day men, and all other servants shall take the liveries and wages accustomed in the twentieth year or four years before so that in the countryside where the wheat was wont to be given they shall take for the bushel 10 d, or wheat at the will of the giver until it be otherwise ordained. And that they be hired to serve by a whole year, or by other usual terms, and not by the day; and that none pay at haymaking time more than a penny a day; and a mower of meadows for the acre 5 d, or 5 d by the day; and reapers of corn in the first week of August 2 d, and the second 3 d and so on until the end of August and less in the country where less was wont to be given, without meat or drink, or other courtesy to be demanded, given, or taken; and that all workmen bring their tools openly in their hands to the merchant towns, and they shall be hired there in a common place and not privately.

Item that none take for the threshing of a quarter of wheat or rye over 2½ d and the quarter of barley, beans, peas and oats 1½ d, if so much were wont to be given. And in the country where it is usual to reap by certain sheaves and to thresh by certain bushels they shall take no more nor in other manner than was wont the said twenty year and before, and that the same servants be sworn two times a year before lords, stewards, bailiffs and constables of every town to observe and perform these ordinances; and that none of them go out of the town where he lives in the winter to serve the summer if he may serve in the same town, taking as before is said. Saving that the people of the counties of Stafford, Lancaster, and Derby, and people of Craven and of the marches of Wales and Scotland, and other places may come in time of August and labour in other counties, and safely return as they were wont to do before this time; and that those who refuse to make such oath, or to not perform as they were sworn to do or have taken upon them shall be put in the stocks by the said lords, stewards, bailiffs and constables of the towns for three days or more or sent to the next gaol, there to remain until they satisfy themselves. And that stocks be made in every town for such occasion, between now and the feast of Pentecost.

Item that carpenters masons and tilers and other workmen of houses shall not take by the day further work except in the manner as they were wont to do, that is to say, a master carpenter 3 d and other carpenters 2 d; a master mason 4 d and other masons 3 d and their servants 1½ d; tilers 3 d and their boys 1½ d; and other coverers of fern and straw 3 d and their boys 1½ d; plasterers and other worker of mud walls and their boys, in the same manner without meat and drink that is from Easter to Michaelmas and from that time less according to the rate and discretion of the justices who shall be assigned thereunto. And those who carry by land or by water shall take no more for such carriage to be made than they were wont to do in the said twentieth year and four years before.

Item that cordwainers and shoemakers shall not sell boots or shoes nor any other thing touching their craft, in any other manner than they were wont to do in the said twentieth year.

Item that goldsmiths, saddlers, horsesmiths spurriers, tanners, corriers, tawers of leather, tailors and other workmen, artificers and labourers, and all other servants not here specified, shall be sworn before the justices, and do use their crafts and offices in this manner as they were wont to do the said twentieth year, and in the time before, without refusing the same because of this ordinance, and if any of the said servants, labourers, workmen or artificers, after such oath made, come against this ordinance, he shall be punished by fine and ransom and imprisonment after the discretion of the justices.

Item that the stewards, bailiffs and constables of the said towns be sworn before the same justices to enquire diligently by all the good ways they may, of all them that come against this ordinance and to certify the same justices of their names at all times, when they shall come into the country to make their sessions, so that the same justices upon the certificate of the said stewards, bailiffs, and constables, of the names of the rebels shall cause their bodies to be attached before the justices, to answer of such contempts so that they make fine and ransom to the king in case they be attainted, and moreover to be commanded to prison there to remain until they have found surety to serve and take and do their work and to sell things vendible in the manner aforesaid. And in case that any of them come against his oath and be thereof attainted, he shall have imprisonment of forty days, and if he is convicted another time, he shall be imprisoned for a quarter of a year so that every time he offends and is convicted he shall have double pain. And that the same justices at every time they come into the country shall enquire of the said stewards, bailiffs and constables if they have made a good and lawful certificate or any concealment for gift, procurement or affinity, and punish them by fine and ransom if they are found guilty. And that the same justices have power to enquire and make due punishment of the said ministers, labourers, workmen and other servants, and also of hostlers, harbergers and all those that sell victuals by retail or other things here not specified, as well as the suit of the party as by presentment, and to hear and determine and put the things in execution by the exigend after the first capias if need be and to depute others under them, as many and such as they shall see best for the keeping of the same ordinances, and that they that will sue against such servants, workmen, labourers and artificers for excess taken of them, and they are attained thereof at their suit, they shall have again such excess. And in case none will sue to have again such excess then it shall be levied of the said servants, labourers, workmen and artificers and delivered to the collectors of the fifteenth in alleviation of the town where such excesses were taken.

Item that no sheriffs constables, bailiffs, and gaolers, the clerks of the justices or of the sheriffs nor other ministers whatsoever they be take any thing for the cause of their office of the same servants for fees, suit of prison or other manner and if they have any thing taken in such manner they shall deliver the same to the collectors of tenths and fifteenths in aid of the commons for the time that the tenth and fifteenth runs, as well for the time past as the time to come, and that the said justices enquire in their sessions if the said ministers have any thing received of the same servants, and that they shall find by such inquests that the said ministers have received, the same justices shall levy of every of the said ministers and deliver to the said collectors, together with the excess and fines and ransom made, and also the amercements of all them that shall be amerced before the said justices, in alleviation of the said towns as before is said. And in case the excess found in one town exceeds the quantity of the fifteenth of the same town the remnant of such excess shall be levied and paid by the said collectors to the next poor town, in aid of their fifteenth, by advice of the said justices, and that the fines and ransoms, excesses and amercements of the said servants, labourers and artificers for the time to come, running of the said fifteenth be delivered to the said collectors in the form aforesaid by indentures to be made between them and the said justices so that the same collectors may be charged upon the account by the same indentures in case that the said fines ransoms, amercements and excesses be not paid in aid of the said fifteenth. And when the fifteenth ceases, it shall be levied to the king's use and answered to him by the sheriffs of the counties.

Item that the justices make their sessions in all English counties at least four times each year, that is to say at the feasts of the Annunciation of Our Lady, St Margaret, St Michael and St Nicholas, and also at all times that shall be necessary, according to the discretion of the justices, and those who speak in the presence of the justices or do other things in their absence or presence in encouragement or maintenance of the servants, labourers or craftsmen against this ordinance, shall be grievously punished by the discretion of the justices. And if any of the servants, labourers or artificers flee from one county to another, because of this ordinance, then the sheriffs of the counties where such fugitives shall be found shall cause them to be taken at the commandment of the said justices of the counties from where they flee, and bring them to the chief gaol of the shire there to abide until the next sessions of the justices. And that the sheriffs return the same commandments before the same justices at their next sessions. And that this ordinance be held and kept as well in the city of London as in other cities and boroughs, and other places throughout the land, within franchises as well as without.

== Consequences ==
The statute's changes failed to take into account the changing economic conditions during the Black Death, and furthermore the period from which wage levels were taken was one of economic depression in England as a result of the Hundred Years' War. Therefore, wages during the Black Death were set even lower to match those during this depression. In practice, the statute was poorly enforced and unsuccessful, but it set a precedent that distinguished between labourers who were "able in body" to work and those who could not work for whatever reasons. This distinction resurfaced in later laws regarding poverty.

The Statute of Labourers (and its counterpart, the Ordinance of Labourers) was, of course, very unpopular with the peasants, who wanted higher wages and better living standards, and was a contributing factor to subsequent peasant revolts, most notably the English peasants' revolt of 1381. Similar processes happened throughout Europe – wage caps following a labour shortage after the Black Death resulting in popular revolts.

The statute was poorly enforced in most areas (and even then, typically only against labourers and not employers), and farm wages in England on average doubled between 1350 and 1450.

== Subsequent developments ==
The act was extended to Ireland by Poynings' Law 1495 (10 Hen. 7. c. 22 (I)).

The whole act was repealed for England and Wales by the Statute Law Revision Act 1863 (26 & 27 Vict. c. 125) and for Ireland by the Statute Law (Ireland) Revision Act 1872 (35 & 36 Vict. c. 98).

== See also ==
- UK labour law
- Apprentices Act 1536 (28 Hen. 8. c. 5)
- Statute of Artificers 1562 (5 Eliz. 1. c. 4), acceptance of work made compulsory, and hours of labour fixed for husbandry
- Statute of Labourers 1603 (1 Jas. 1. c. 6) allowed justices of peace to fix hours of work for all classes of worker. It became a criminal offence for workers to receive more than their set price of wages.
- Combination Act 1800 (39 & 40 Geo. 3. c. 106) summary jurisdiction to convict workmen who, by intimidation, persuasion, or by other means, induced persons not to work, or who refused to work with other workmen.

== Bibliography ==
- Clark, Gregory (2007). "The long march of history: Farm wages, population, and economic growth, England 1209–1869" (PDF). Economic History Review. 60 (1): 97–135. doi:10.1111/j.1468-0289.2006.00358.x.
- Cohn, Samuel (2007). "After the Black Death: Labour Legislation and Attitudes Towards Labour in Late-Medieval Western Europe". Economic History Review. 60 (3): 457–485. doi:10.1111/j.1468-0289.2006.00368.x. JSTOR 4502106.
- Poos, Larry R. (1983). "The Social Context of Statute of Labourers Enforcement". Law and History Review. 1 (1): 27–52. doi:10.2307/744001. JSTOR 744001.
- Putnam, Bertha Haven (1908). The enforcement of the statutes of labourers during the first decade after the black death, 1349–1359. Columbia University. ISBN 978-0-404-51085-5 – via Google Books.
