= Spurrier =

Spurrier was originally a person who made spurs. It is now a surname.

== Surnames ==
- Christopher Spurrier (1783–1876), English politician
- Henry Spurrier (1898–1964), British engineer and industrialist
- Junior J. Spurrier, American combat soldier
- Lonnie Spurrier (1932–2015), American middle-distance runner
- Martha Spurrier, British lawyer
- Nicola Spurrier, Australian paediatrician and public health physician, Chief Public Health Officer of South Australia
- Paul Spurrier (born 1967), British child actor, screenwriter and film director
- Peter Spurrier (1942–2005), officer of arms at the College of Arms in London
- Simon Spurrier, British comics writer and novelist
- Steve Spurrier (born 1945), American football player and coach
- Steven Spurrier (artist) (1878–1961), British artist and painter.
- Steven Spurrier (wine merchant) (born 1941), British wine expert and merchant
