= Statute of Monopolies =

Act of the Parliament of England

Statute of Monopolies (Note: The citation of this act by this short title was authorised by section 5 of, and the second schedule to, the Statute Law Revision Act 1948. Due to the repeal of those provisions, it is now authorised by section 19(2) of the Interpretation Act 1978.)
- Act of Parliament
- Parliament of England
- Long title: An Act concerning Monopolies and Dispensations with penall Lawes and the Forfeyture thereof. (Note: These words are printed against this act in the second column of the second schedule to the Statute Law Revision Act 1948, which is headed "Title".)
- Citation: 21 Jas. 1. c. 3
- Introduced by: Sir Edward Coke (Commons)
- Territorial extent: England and Wales

Dates
- Royal assent: 29 May 1624
- Commencement: 12 February 1623/4 (Note: Start of session.)
Other legislation
Amended by	Statute Law Revision Act 1863; Patents, Designs, and Trade Marks Act 1883; Statute Law Revision Act 1888; Statute Law Revision Act 1948; Administration of Justice Act 1965; Criminal Law Act 1967; Statute Law (Repeals) Act 1969

Status: Partially repealed

Text of statute as originally enacted

Revised text of statute as amended

Text of the Statute of Monopolies 1623 as in force today (including any amendments) within the United Kingdom, from legislation.gov.uk.

The Statute of Monopolies (21 Jas. 1. c. 3) is an act of the Parliament of England notable as the first statutory expression of English patent law. Patents evolved from letters patent, issued by the monarch to grant monopolies over particular industries to skilled individuals with new techniques. Originally intended to strengthen England's economy by making it self-sufficient and promoting new industries, the system gradually became seen as a way to raise money (through charging patent-holders) without having to incur the public unpopularity of a tax. Elizabeth I particularly used the system extensively, issuing patents for common commodities such as starch and salt. Unrest eventually persuaded her to turn the administration of patents over to the common law courts, but her successor, James I, used it even more. Despite a committee established to investigate grievances and excesses, Parliament made several efforts to further curtail the monarch's power. The result was the Statute of Monopolies, passed on 29 May 1624.

The statute repealed some past and future patents and monopolies but preserved exceptions: one of these was for patents for novel inventions. Seen as a key moment in the evolution of patent law, the statute has also been described as "one of the landmarks in the transition of [England's] economy from the feudal to the capitalist". Even with the statute in force, it took over a century for a comprehensive legal doctrine around patents to come into existence, and James I's successor Charles I regularly abused the patents system by ensuring that all cases relating to his actions were heard in conciliar courts, which he controlled. The English Civil War and the resulting Stuart Restoration finally curtailed this system. The statute is still the basis for Australian law, and until the United Kingdom began following the European Patent Convention in 1977, was also a strong pillar of the United Kingdom's intellectual property law.

== Background ==
Historically, English patent law was based on custom and the common law, not on statute. It began as the Crown granted patents as a form of economic protection to ensure high industrial production. As gifts from the Crown, there was no judicial review, oversight or consideration, and no actual law developed around patents. This practice came from the guilds, groups who were controlled by the Crown and held monopolies over particular industries. By the 14th century the economy of England was lagging behind that of other European nations, with the guilds too small to control industrial production successfully. To remedy this, Edward II began encouraging foreign workmen and inventors to settle in England, offering "letters of protection" that protected them from guild policy on the condition that they train English apprentices and pass on their knowledge. The first recorded letter of protection was given in 1331. The letters did not grant a full monopoly; rather they acted as an extended passport, allowing foreign workers to travel to England and practice their trade. An exceptional example (considered the first full patent in England) was issued to John of Utynam on 3 April 1449, granting him a monopoly. Overseas, the practice of granting full industrial patents and monopolies became common in Italian states by the 1420s.

Over the next century, the granting of full industrial patents became a more common practice in England; the next record is a letter from 1537 to Thomas Cromwell, Henry VIII's private secretary, from Antonio Guidotti, a Venetian silk-merchant. Guidotti had persuaded a group of Venetian silk-makers to practice in England, and wanted the king to grant him letters patent protecting their monopoly to grow silk for 15 or 20 years. This was granted, and Henry's son Edward VI followed up with a grant of letters patent to Henry Smyth, who hoped to introduce foreign glassworking techniques into England. This process continued after Elizabeth I came to the throne, with formal procedures set out in 1561 to issue letters patent to any new industry, allowing monopolies. The granting of these patents was highly popular with the monarch, both before and after the Statute of Monopolies, because of the potential for raising revenue. A patentee was expected to pay heavily for the patent, and unlike a tax raise (another method of raising Crown money) any public unrest as a result of the patent was normally directed at the patentee, not the monarch.

Over time, this became more and more problematic; instead of temporary monopolies on specific, imported industries, long-term monopolies came about over more common commodities, including salt and starch. These "odious monopolies" led to a showdown between the Crown and Parliament, in which it was agreed in 1601 to turn the power to administer patents over to the common law courts; at the same time, Elizabeth revoked a number of the more restrictive and damaging monopolies. Even given a string of judicial decisions criticising and overruling such monopolies, James I, Elizabeth I's successor, continued using patents to create monopolies. Despite the Committee of Grievances, a body chaired by Sir Edward Coke that abolished a large number of monopolies, a wave of protest occurred at the expansion of the system. On 27 March 1621, James suggested the House of Commons draw up a list of the three most objectionable patents, and he would "give Life to it, without alteration", but by this time a statute was already being prepared by Coke. After passing on 12 May 1621 it was thrown out by the House of Lords, but a Statute of Monopolies was finally passed by Parliament on 29 May 1624.

== Act ==
=== Sections 1–5 ===
Section 1 of the statute provided that:

all Monopolies, and all Commissions, Grants, Licences, Charters and Letters Patents heretofore made or granted, or hereafter to be made or granted, to any Person or Persons, Bodies Politick or Corporate whatsoever, of or for the sole Buying, Selling, Making, Working or Using of any Thing within this Realm, or the Dominion of Wales ... or of any other Monopolies, or of Power, Liberty or Faculty, to dispense with any others, or to give Licence or Toleration to do, use or exercise any Thing against the Tenor or Purport of any Law or Statute ... and all Proclamations, Inhibitions, Restraints, Warrants of Assistants, and all other Matters and Things whatsoever, any way tending to the Instituting, Erecting, Strengthening, Furthering or Countenancing of the same or any of them ... are altogether contrary to the Laws of this Realm, and so are and shall be utterly void and of none Effect, and in no wise to be put in Use or Execution.

Crucially, this rendered all past, present and future patents and monopolies null and void. Patents were normally divided into three categories; patents for a particular invention, patents exempting a patent-holder from legislation, and patents for a particular trade or industry. Section 1, however, for the first time discussed a new category of patents; those "of Power, Liberty or Faculty". These patents were normally used in relation to penal laws, to "farm out" the business of administering to criminals and dispensing justice to private companies and individuals. The statute, in a break from previous law, emphasised that this power lay only within Parliament.

Section 2 of the statute provided that all future patents granted should be determined by the common law, and not otherwise, while section 3 of the statute emphasised that companies and individuals now or in the future in possession of patents should not be allowed to exercise them.

Sections 4 and 5 of the statute provided that if anyone was interfered with 40 days after the statute was passed due to a patent or monopoly, any goods seized or persons imprisoned would be returned to their owners and released respectively.

Section 5 of the act was repealed by section 1 of, and the schedule to, the Statute Law Revision Act 1863 (26 & 27 Vict. c. 125), which came into force on 28 July 1863.

=== Sections 6–9 ===
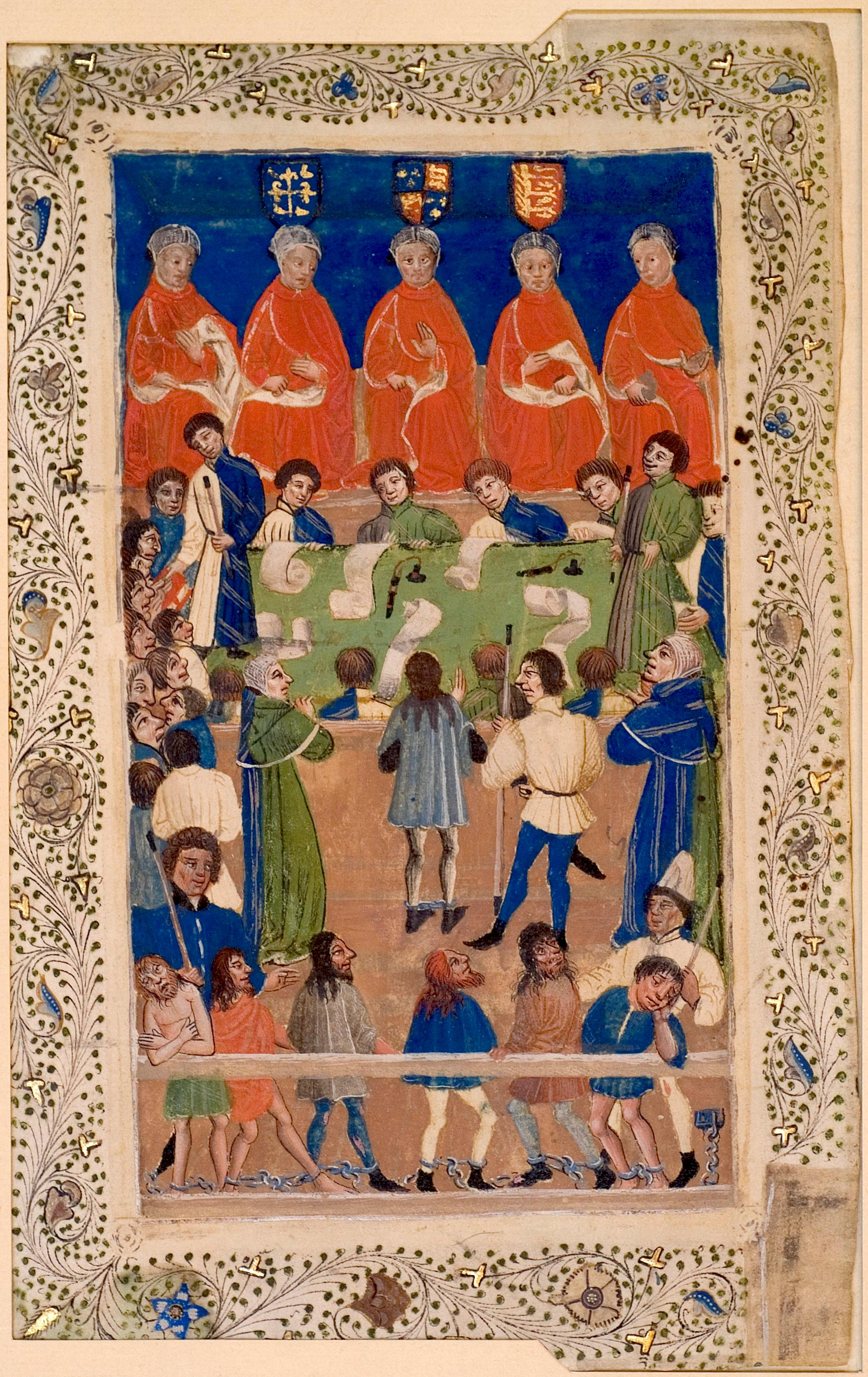
The Court of King's Bench, which the Statute of Monopolies explicitly exempted from its limitations on penal administration

The most important part of the statute is section 6, which lays out the exceptions to the rules preventing any kind of monopoly or patent. It stated that the previous provisions:

shall not extend to any letters patents (b) and grants of privilege for the term of fourteen years or under, hereafter to be made, of the sole working or making of any manner of new manufactures within this realm (c) to the true and first inventor (d) and inventors of such manufactures, which others at the time of making such letters patents and grants shall not use (e), so as also they be not contrary to the law nor mischievous to the state by raising prices of commodities at home, or hurt of trade, or generally inconvenient (f): the same fourteen years to be accounted from the date of the first letters patents or grant of such privilege hereafter to be made, but that the same shall be of such force as they should be if this act had never been made, and of none other (g).

Essentially, this established a wide area in which patents could be granted, on the condition that monopolies lasted no longer than 14 years. These patents would apply to any new "manner" of "manufacture", with "manufacture" referring both to the creation of an object, and the design for that object. Section 7 provided that the statute did not prejudice or overrule any previous statutory measures, while Section 8 provided that the restoration to Parliament of the power to administer penal law did not in any way infringe upon the right of the king, Court of King's Bench, Court of Common Pleas or other criminal courts to order someone's imprisonment. Section 9 of the statute provided that the rejection of letters patent and licenses did not extend to corporations over towns, such as the City of London Corporation.

=== Section 12: Coals from Newcastle ===
The Hostmen of Newcastle claimed the legal monopoly of exporting coals from the river Tyne to any town in England. The government of Elizabeth I was in favour of the monopoly because it could use the Hostmen to collect a tax on coal. The monopoly existed by 1600 and probably much earlier; until the mid-Victorian era, most of London's coal was shipped from the river Tyne.

Although the Statute of Monopolies declared monopolies null and void, section 12 was included to preserve the rights of the Newcastle Hostmen:

That this act, or any declaration, provision, penalty, forfeiture, or other thing before mentioned, shall not extend or be prejudicial to any use, custom, prescription franchise, freedom, jurisdiction, immunity, liberty, or privilege, heretofore claimed, used, or enjoyed by the governors and stewards and brethren of the fellowship of the hoast-men of the town of Newcastle upon Tine, or by the antient fellowship, guild, or fraternity commonly called hoastmen, for or concerning the selling, carrying, lading, disposing, shipping, venting, or trading of or for any sea- coals, stone-coals, or pit-coals, forth or out of the haven and river of Tine; or to any grant made by the said governor and stewards and brethren of the fellowship of the said hoast-men, to the late Queen Elizabeth, of any duty or sum of money to be paid for or in respect of any such coals as aforesaid.

The monopoly was vigorously exercised until about 1720 — the Hostmen often seized coals laden aboard ship without their authority — but was gradually abandoned over doubts about the wording.

=== Dating of the Statute of Monopolies ===
The Statute of Monopolies is properly cited without a year. However, when it is cited with a year there are writers who use 1623 and some who use 1624. The confusion arises because the parliamentary session in which it passed assembled on 12 February 1624 (using modern dating), but at the time this would have been 12 February 1623 (as the New Year in England at the time was on Lady Day, 25 March). The act received royal assent on 29 May 1624. At the time all acts passed within a session commenced on the first day of the session. So legally the act was commenced in February 1623, but in terms of historical dating it was commenced and was passed in 1624.

== Significance ==
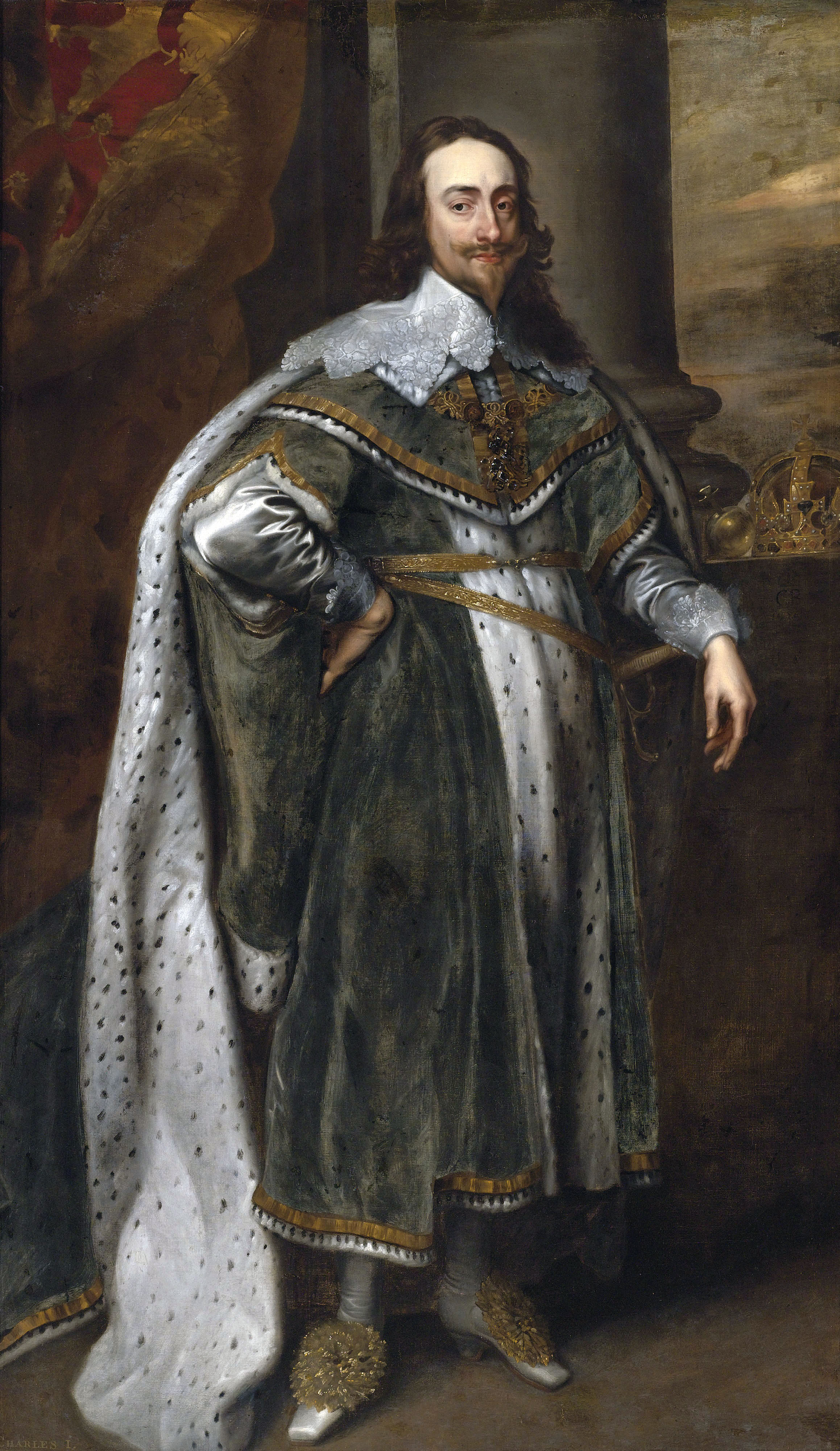
Charles I, who continued abusing the patents system even after the Statute of Monopolies

The statute is worded "strongly and broadly", and other than the exceptions mainly repeated the existing common law. The statute has long been considered a key moment in patent law; Chris Dent, writing in the Melbourne University Law Review, identifies it as "a significant marker in the history of patents" with continuing importance, although it is neither the start nor end of patent law. Despite the statute, the courts did not develop a comprehensive and coherent legal doctrine for patent law for more than a century after the statute came into force. Not only is it highly important within patent law, it also played a large role in economics; G. A. Bloxam, writing in the Journal of Industrial Economics, identifies the passage of the Statute of Monopolies as "one of the landmarks in the transition of [England's] economy from the feudal to the capitalist".

As well as being significant in relation to patent law, Whig historians have also identified it as the first infringement upon the monarch's Royal Prerogative, and one of the first occasions in which the self-confident House of Commons overruled the king, eventually leading to the English Civil War. Chris R. Kyle, writing in the Journal of Legal History, notes that this is not the case; not only did the Statute of Monopolies only restate the previous common law, leading to no infringement upon the Royal Prerogative, James I was in the later stages of the bill supportive of its principles. James I was not opposed to the motion; during the 1621 session of Parliament, he voided several monopolies (included those for silver thread and inns), and both James and the Privy Council were active during the passage of the bill to ensure it was supported. Furthermore, the Prince, later Charles I offered amendments in the House of Lords to support its passage.

== Subsequent developments ==
The statute required extensive judicial action to make it work, particularly on the interpretation of Section 6. Sir Edward Coke, in his Institutes of the Lawes of England, wrote that

[N]ew manufacture must have seven properties. First, it must be for twenty-one years or under. Secondly, it must be granted to the first and true inventor. Thirdly, it must be of such manufactures, which any other at the making of such letters patent did not use ... Fourthly, the privilege must not be contrary to law ... Fifthly, nor mischievous to the state, by raising the prices of commodities at home. In every such new manufacture that deserves a privilege, there must be urgens necessitas et evidens utilitas. Sixthly, nor to the hurt of trade ... Seventhly, nor generally inconvenient.

The subject was also discussed in Bircot's Case, where it was decided that an inventive improvement to an existing industry or invention was not a new "material", and could not be patented; such an improvement was described as "to put but a new button to an old coat". Hasting's Case confirmed that a patent would not be issued, even for a new "material", that was extremely close to an old one, something originally laid down in Matthey's Case. The statute did not stop the monarch issuing such patents in return for money; after James I's death, Charles I continued issuing them and avoided having to obey the law by having any cases heard in the conciliar courts, such as the Star Chamber. In response to this abuse and others, the Star Chamber was abolished by the Habeas Corpus Act 1640. After the English Restoration, these activities largely ceased because of the dominant power of Parliament and the Bill of Rights 1689, which completely abolished the king's ability to disobey or alter statute.

The Statute of Monopolies dominated patent law for centuries; it was received into the laws of many common law jurisdictions and still forms the basis for the modern patent laws of those countries: for example, the patent law of Australia is dominated by the Patents Act 1990, which states that one test for if something is patentable is if it relates to "a manner of manufacture within the meaning of section 6 of the Statute of Monopolies".

In England and Wales, some sections of the statute are still technically in force, although the Statute Law Revision Act 1863, Patents, Designs, and Trade Marks Act 1883 (46 & 47 Vict. c. 57), Statute Law Revision Act 1948, Administration of Justice Act 1965 and Statute Law (Repeals) Act 1969 repealed most of the legislation. In practice however, with the Patents Act 1977 (which brought the United Kingdom into line with the European Patent Convention), the statute has been implicitly repealed within England and Wales.

In the preamble, the words from " and of the benefitt" to " the forfeiture ", in section 1, the words from " or to give licence" to " the same or any of them,", and sections 2–4 of the act were repealed by section 1 of, and part VII of the schedule to, the Statute Law (Repeals) Act 1969, which came into force on 1 January 1970.

== See also ==
- Statute of Anne
- Intellectual property
- Patent

== Bibliography ==
- Bloxam, G.A. (1957). "Letters Patent for Inventions: Their Use and Misuse". The Journal of Industrial Economics. 5 (3). Wiley & Sons. doi:10.2307/2097445. ISSN 0022-1821. JSTOR 2097445.
- Dendy, F.W. (1901). Extracts from the Records of the Company of Hostmen of Newcastle-Upon-Tyne. Durham: Surtees Society.
- Dent, Chris (2009). "'Generally Inconvenient': The 1624 Statute of Monopolies as Political Compromise". Melbourne University Law Review. 33 (2). University of Melbourne. ISSN 0025-8938.
- Johnson, Phillip (2017). Privatised Law Reform: A History of Patent Law through Private Legislation, 1620–1907. Routledge. ISBN 9781138565555.
- Klitzke, Ramon A. (1959). "Historical Background of the English Patent Law". Journal of the Patent Office Society. 41 (9). Patent and Trademark Office. ISSN 0096-3577.
- Kyle, Chris R. (1998). "'But a New Button to an Old Coat': The Enactment of the Statute of Monopolies, 21 James I cap.3". Journal of Legal History. 19 (3). Routledge: 203–223. doi:10.1080/01440361908539576. ISSN 0144-0365.
- Mossoff, Adam (2001). "Rethinking the Development of Patents: An Intellectual History, 1550-1800". Hastings Law Journal. 52 (6). University of California, Hastings College of the Law: 1255–1322. ISSN 0017-8322.
- Nachbar, Thomas B. (2005). "Monopoly, Mercantilism, and the Politics of Regulation". Virginia Law Review. 91 (6). The Virginia Law Review Association: 1313–1379. ISSN 0042-6601. JSTOR 3649413.
- Pila, Justine (2001). "The common law invention in its original form". Intellectual Property Quarterly. 3 (1). Sweet & Maxwell. ISSN 1364-906X.
- Ramsey, George (1936). "The Historical Background of Patents". Journal of the Patent Office Society. 18 (1). Patent and Trademark Office Society. ISSN 0096-3577.
