= Apprentices Act 1536 =

Act of the Parliament of England

Apprentices Act 1536 (Note: The citation of this act by this short title was authorised by section 5 of, and the second schedule to, the Statute Law Revision Act 1948. Due to the repeal of those provisions, it is now authorised by section 19(2) of the Interpretation Act 1978.)
- Act of Parliament
- Parliament of England
- Long title: An Acte for avoydyng of exaccyons taken upon Prentesis in the Cyties Boroughes and Townes corporatt. (Note: These words are printed against this act in the second column of the second schedule to the Statute Law Revision Act 1948, which is headed "Title".)
- Citation: 28 Hen. 8. c. 5
- Territorial extent: England and Wales

Dates
- Royal assent: 18 July 1536
- Commencement: 8 June 1536 (Note: Start of session.)
- Repealed: 1 January 1970
Other legislation
Repealed by	Statute Law Revision Act 1887; Statute Law Revision Act 1948; Statute Law (Repeals) Act 1969

Status: Repealed

Text of statute as originally enacted

The Apprentices Act 1536 (28 Hen. 8. c. 5) was an act of the Parliament of England.

== Subsequent developments ==
Section 1 of the act, from "nor by any" to "Henry the Eighth", was repealed by section 1 of, and the schedule to, the Statute Law Revision Act 1887 (50 & 51 Vict. c. 59), which came into force on 16 September 1887.

The act was repealed from the beginning to the words "more playnly may appere" by section 1 of, and the first schedule to, the Statute Law Revision Act 1948 (11 & 12 Geo. 6. c. 62), which came into force on 30 July 1948.

The whole act, so far as unrepealed, was repealed by section 1 of, and part VII of the schedule to, the Statute Law (Repeals) Act 1969, which came into force on 1 January 1970.
