= John of Utynam =

John of Utynam is the recipient of the first known English patent, granted in 1449 by King Henry VI. John was a master glass-maker from Flanders who came to England to make the windows for Eton College. The patent granted him a 20-year monopoly on the making of stained glass.

The Republic of Venice had begun issuing patents to glass-makers in the early 1420s.
