= Mitchel v Reynolds =

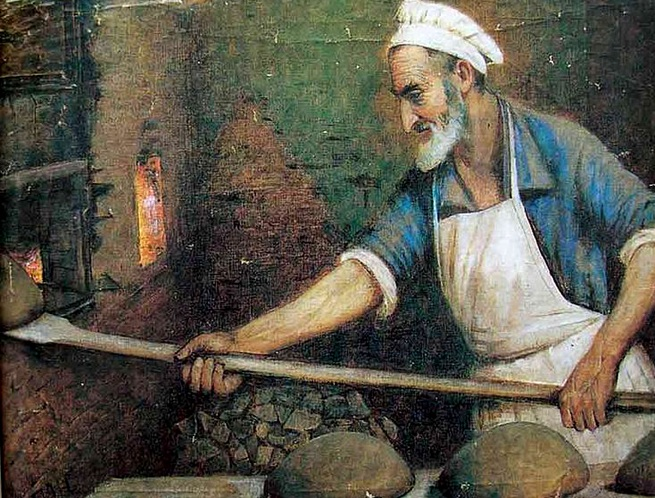
- A bake shop
- Court: Court of the Queen's Bench
- Citation: (1711) 1 PWms 181, 24 ER 347, 45 Digest (Repl) 395, [1558-1774] All ER Rep 26

Court membership
- Judge sitting: Lord Macclesfield

Keywords
- Restraint of trade

Mitchel v Reynolds (1711) 1 PWms 181 is decision in the history of the law of restraint of trade, handed down in 1711 in England. It is generally cited for establishing the principle that reasonable restraints of trade, unlike unreasonable restraints of trade, are permissible and therefore enforceable and not a basis for civil or criminal liability. It is largely the basis in US antitrust law for the "rule of reason." William Howard Taft, then Chief Judge of the Sixth Circuit Court of Appeals, later US President and then Chief Justice of the Supreme Court, quoted Mitchel extensively when he first developed the antitrust rule-of-reason doctrine in Addyston Pipe & Steel Co. v. United States, which was affirmed in 1899 by the Supreme Court. The doctrine also played a major role in the 1911 Supreme Court case Standard Oil Company of New Jersey v. United States 221 U.S. 1 (1911).

Mitchel is also cited for the proposition that usually harmful practices may be rebuttably presumed unlawful, so that the burden of showing legitimacy is placed on the proponent of the practice.

== Facts ==
Reynolds was a baker at St Andrew Holborn, which included both Lincoln's Inn and Gray's Inn, and therefore a considerable number of lawyers. In this litigation-prone environment, Reynolds chose to rent his bakeshop business to Mitchel for five years and gave Mitchel a bond for £50 with the condition that the bond would be void if Reynolds did not act as a baker in the parish within the next five years. Reynolds resumed his trade as a baker at another location in the parish within the five years, and Mitchel sued on the bond.

Reynolds defended by demurrer, contending that the bond was void because it was on a restraint of trade. His position was that any such restraint of trade was illegal per se, since it prevented him from exercising his trade as a baker.

== Judgment ==
The Court of the Queen's Bench, with Chief Justice Parker (Lord Macclesfield), held this restraint of trade was reasonable and therefore lawful, although general restraints of trade were unlawful. It was ancillary to a legitimate transaction (the rental or sale of the bakeshop business) and it was reasonably necessary to effectuate the main purpose. Its extent was limited to what was necessary to accomplish the main purpose of the transaction. If Reynolds reopened his bakery business, he would attract his old customers and deprive Mitchel of the benefit of his bargain with Reynolds, which included the goodwill of the business (i.e., the habit of the customers to continue to buy baked goods at the same location). Although a restraint of trade without a good reason to support it is presumed unlawful, the court ruled, the presumption can be rebutted and overcome by facts such as those present here: the restraint of trade was necessary and ancillary to a lawful transaction.

== Significance ==
Lord Macclesfield was later impeached for corruption: involved in bribery to sell offices, and using client money (which he then lost) to speculate in the slave-trading South Sea Company.

Mitchel took on much greater significance in the US, due to its citation by Taft J in Addyston Pipe & Steel Co. v. United States, which was affirmed in 1899 by the Supreme Court for the so called "rule of reason" test. The extent of this rule has been debated. Even if a restraint is necessary and ancillary, within the meaning of the Mitchel and Addyston Pipe cases, it may still be an unreasonable restraint of trade if its anticompetive effects, and consequent harm to the public interest, outweigh its benefits. As Judge Ginsburg opined in the Polygram case:

If the only way a new product can be profitably introduced is to restrain the legitimate competition of older products, then one must seriously wonder whether consumers are genuinely benefited by the new product.

In the same vein, the U.S. Department of Justice and the Federal Trade Commission stated a similar approach in the 1995 Antitrust Guidelines for the Licensing of Intellectual Property:

If the Agencies conclude that the restraint has, or is likely to have, an anticompetitive effect, they will consider whether it is reasonably necessary to achieve procompetitive efficiencies. If the restraint is reasonably necessary, the Agencies will balance the procompetitive efficiencies and the anticompetitive effects to determine the probable net effect on competition in each relevant market.

Questions have been raised as to how necessary a restraint must be to the accomplishment of the main purpose to which it is claimed to be ancillary. For example, must it be indispensable? Is it sufficient if it is of some aid? The FTC-DOJ 2000 Guidelines for Collaborations among Competitors say that, in determining whether a restraint is "reasonably necessary," the issue is "whether practical, significantly less restrictive means were reasonably available when the agreement was entered into."

A related issue is "necessary to what?" In one recent case, a court rejected a credit card issuer's attempted justification of a restriction against competitive dealings said to be reasonably necessary to promote "loyalty" and "cohesion." How necessary and necessary to what thus remain controverted issues under the doctrine of Mitchel v. Reynolds.

== See also ==
- US antitrust law
- EU competition law
- UK competition law
