= Ordinance of Labourers 1349 =

English price and wage control decree

- Act of Parliament
- Parliament of England
- Long title: None
- Citation: 23 Edw. 3 cc. 1–8
- Territorial extent: England and Wales; Ireland

Dates
- Royal assent: 18 June 1349
- Commencement: 18 June 1349 (Note: Start of session.)
- Repealed: England and Wales: 28 July 1863; Ireland: 10 August 1872

Other legislation
- Amended by: Continuance, etc. of Laws Act 1623
- Repealed by: England and Wales: Statute Law Revision Act 1863; Ireland: Statute Law (Ireland) Revision Act 1872

Status: Repealed

Text of statute as originally enacted

The Ordinance of Labourers 1349 (23 Edw. 3) was an act of the Parliament of England. The ordinance is often considered to be the start of English labour law. Specifically, it fixed wages and imposed price controls; required all those under the age of 60 to work; prohibited the enticing away of another's servants; and other terms.

Because a great part of the people, and especially of workmen and servants late died of the pestilence, many seeing the necessity of masters, and great scarcity of servants, will not serve unless they may receive excessive wages, and some rather willing to beg in idleness, than by labour to get their living; we, considering the grievous incommodities, which of the lack especially of ploughmen and such labourers may hereafter come, have upon deliberation and treaty with the prelates and the nobles, and learned men assisting us, of their counsel ordained: — Preamble

== Background ==
The ordinance was issued in response to the 1348−1350 outbreak of the Black Death in England. During this outbreak, an estimated 30−40% of the population died. The decline in population left surviving workers in great demand in the agricultural economy of Britain.

Landowners had to face the choice of raising wages to compete for workers or letting their lands go unused. Wages for labourers rose and translated into inflation across the economy as goods became more expensive to produce. The wealthy elites suffered under the sudden economic shift. Difficulties in hiring labour created frustration. John Gower commented on post-plague labourers: "they are sluggish, they are scarce, and they are grasping. For the very little they do they demand the highest pay." On the other hand, while some workers suffered from increasing prices, others benefited from the higher wages they could command during this period of labour shortage. "The population losses from the plague caused wages to soar to levels that often exceeded those of the early 20th century", peasants and labourers who had previously been tied to the land were suddenly able to demand higher wages and greater freedom. Employers were then forced to compete for their labor or risk having a shortage of labor available to them. This shift in the value of labor was a key factor in the social and economic changes that occurred in Britain in the centuries that followed.

The law was issued by King Edward III of England on 18 June 1349.

== The law ==
The ordinance required several things, including:

- Everyone under 60 must work.
- Employers must not hire excess workers.
- Employers may not pay and workers may not receive wages higher than pre-plague levels.
- Food must be priced reasonably with no excess profit.
- No one, under the pain of imprisonment, was to give any thing to able-bodied beggars 'under the colour of pity or alms'.

That every man and woman of our realm of England, of what condition he be, free or bond, able in body, and within the age of threescore years, not living in merchandise, nor exercising any craft, nor having of his own whereof he may live, nor proper land, about whose tillage he may himself occupy, and not serving any other, if he in convenient service, his estate considered, be required to serve, he shall be bounden to serve him which so shall him require; and take only the wages, livery, meed, or salary, which were accustomed to be given in the places where he oweth to serve, the twentieth year of our reign of England, or five or six other commone years next before. Provided always, that the lords be preferred before other in their bondmen or their land tenants, so in their service to be retained; so that nevertheless the said lords shall retain no more than be necessary for them; and if any such man or woman, being so required to serve, will not the same do, that proved by two true men before the sheriff or the constables of the town where the same shall happen to be done, he shall anon be taken by them or any of them, and committed to the next gaol, there to remain under strait keeping, till he find surety to serve in the form aforesaid.

Item, if any reaper, mower, or other workman or servant, of what estate or condition that he be, retained in any man's service, do depart from the said service without reasonable cause or license, before the term agreed, he shall have pain of imprisonment. And that none under the same pain presume to receive or to retain any such in his service.

Item, that no man pay, or promise to pay, any servant any more wages, liveries, meed, or salary than was wont, as afore is said; nor that any in other manner shall demand or receive the same, upon pain of doubling of that, that so shall be paid, promised, required, or received, to him which thereof shall feel himself grieved, pursuing for the same; and if none such will pursue, then the same to be applied to any of the people that will pursue; and such pursuit shall be in the court of the lord of the place where such case shall happen.

Item, if the lords of the towns or manors presume in any point to come against this present ordinance either by them, or by their servants, then pursuit shall be made against them in the counties, wapentakes, tithings, or such other courts, for the treble pain paid or promised by them or their servants in the form aforesaid; and if any before this present ordinance hath covenanted with any so to serve for more wages, he shall not be bound by reason of the same covenant, to pay more than at any other time was wont to be paid to such person; nor upon the said pain shall presume any more to pay.

Item, that saddlers, skinners, white-tawers, cordwainers, tailors, smiths, carpenters, masons, tilers, [shipwrights], carters, and all other artificers and workmen, shall not take for their labour and workmanship above the same that was wont to be paid to such persons the said twentieth year, and other common years next before, as afore is said, in the place where they shall happen to work; and if any man take more, he shall be committed to the next gaol, in manner as afore is said.

Item, that butchers, fishmongers, hostelers, breweres, bakers, puters, and all other sellers of all manner of victual, shall be bound to sell the same victual for a reasonable price, having respect to the price that such victual be sold at in the places adjoining, so that the same sellers have moderate gains, and not excessive, reasonably to be required according to the distance of the place from whence the said victuals be carried; and if any sell such victuals in any other manner, and thereof be convict in the manner and form aforesaid, he shall pay the double of the same that he so received, to the party damnified, or, in default of him, to any other that will pursue in this behalf: and the mayors and bailiffs of cities, boroughs, merchant-towns, and others, and of the ports and places of the sea, shall have power to inquire of all and singular which shall in any thing offend the same, and to levy the said pain to the use of them at whose suit such offenders shall be convict; and in case that the same mayors or bailiffs be negligent in doing execution of the premises, and thereof be convict before our justices, by us to be assigned, then the same mayors and bailiffs shall be compelled by the same justices to pay the treble of the thing so sold to the party damnified, or to any other in default of him that will pursue; and nevertheless toward us they shall be grievously punished.

Item, because that many valiant beggars, as long as they may live of begging, do refuse to labour, giving themselves to idleness and vice, and sometime to theft and other abominations; none upon the said pain of imprisonment shall, under the colour of pity or alms, give any thing to such, which may labour, or presume to favour them toward their desires, so that thereby they may be compelled to labour for their necessary living.

We command you, firmly enjoining, that all and singular the premises in the cities, boroughs, market towns, seaports, and other places in your bailiwick, where you shall think expedient, as well within liberties as without, you do cause to be publicly proclaimed, and to be observed and duly put in execution aforesaid.

== Aftermath and repeal ==
The ordinance has largely been seen as ineffective. Despite the English parliament's attempt to reinforce the ordinance with the Statute of Labourers of 1351, workers continued to command higher wages and the majority of England (those in the labouring class) enjoyed a century of relative prosperity before the ratio of labour to land restored the pre-plague levels of wages and prices. While the economic situation eventually reverted, the plague radically altered the social structure of English society. The sudden loss of life gave more power to the labouring classes. This also helped weaken the landed elites that had to give up power in order to stay relevant both in society and in the economy. Another thing that changed due to this imbalance of power was an increase in worker negotiating power in the British economy. This slowly led to a gradual increase in workers' rights.

The act was extended to Ireland by Poynings' Law 1495 (10 Hen. 7. c. 22 (I)).

Chapter 7 of the act was repealed for England and Wales by section 11 of the Continuance, etc. of Laws Act 1623 (21 Jas. 1. c. 28).

The whole act was repealed for England and Wales by section 1 of, and the schedule to, the Statute Law Revision Act 1863 (26 & 27 Vict. c. 125), which came into force on 28 July 1863.

The whole act was repealed for Ireland by section 1 of, and the schedule to, the Statute Law (Ireland) Revision Act 1872 (35 & 36 Vict. c. 98), which came into force on 10 August 1872.
