= Dyer's Case =

1414 English contract law case

Dyer's case (1414) 2 Hen. V, fol. 5, pl. 26 is an old English contract law case concerning restraint of trade and the doctrine of consideration.

== Facts ==
Mr. John Dyer had given a promise to not exercise his trade in the same town as the plaintiff for six months but the plaintiff had promised nothing in return. The plaintiff had not bothered to attend court for the hearing.

== Judgment ==
On hearing the plaintiff's attempt to enforce this restraint, Hull J exclaimed,

In my opinion, you might have demurred upon him that the obligation is void, inasmuch as the condition is against the common law; and by God, if the plaintiff were here, he should go to prison until he had paid a fine to the King.

== See also ==
- Consideration in English law
- Privity in English law
- Non-compete clause
