= Restraint of trade =

Common law doctrine

Restraints of trade is a common law doctrine relating to the enforceability of contractual restrictions on freedom to conduct business. It is a precursor of modern competition law. In an old leading case of Mitchel v Reynolds (1711) Lord Smith LC said,

it is the privilege of a trader in a free country, in all matters not contrary to law, to regulate his own mode of carrying it on according to his own discretion and choice. If the law has regulated or restrained his mode of doing this, the law must be obeyed. But no power short of the general law ought to restrain his free discretion.

A contractual undertaking not to trade is void and unenforceable against the promisor as contrary to the public policy of promoting trade, unless the restraint of trade is reasonable to protect the interest of the purchaser of a business. Restraints of trade can also appear in post-termination restrictive covenants in employment contracts.

== History ==
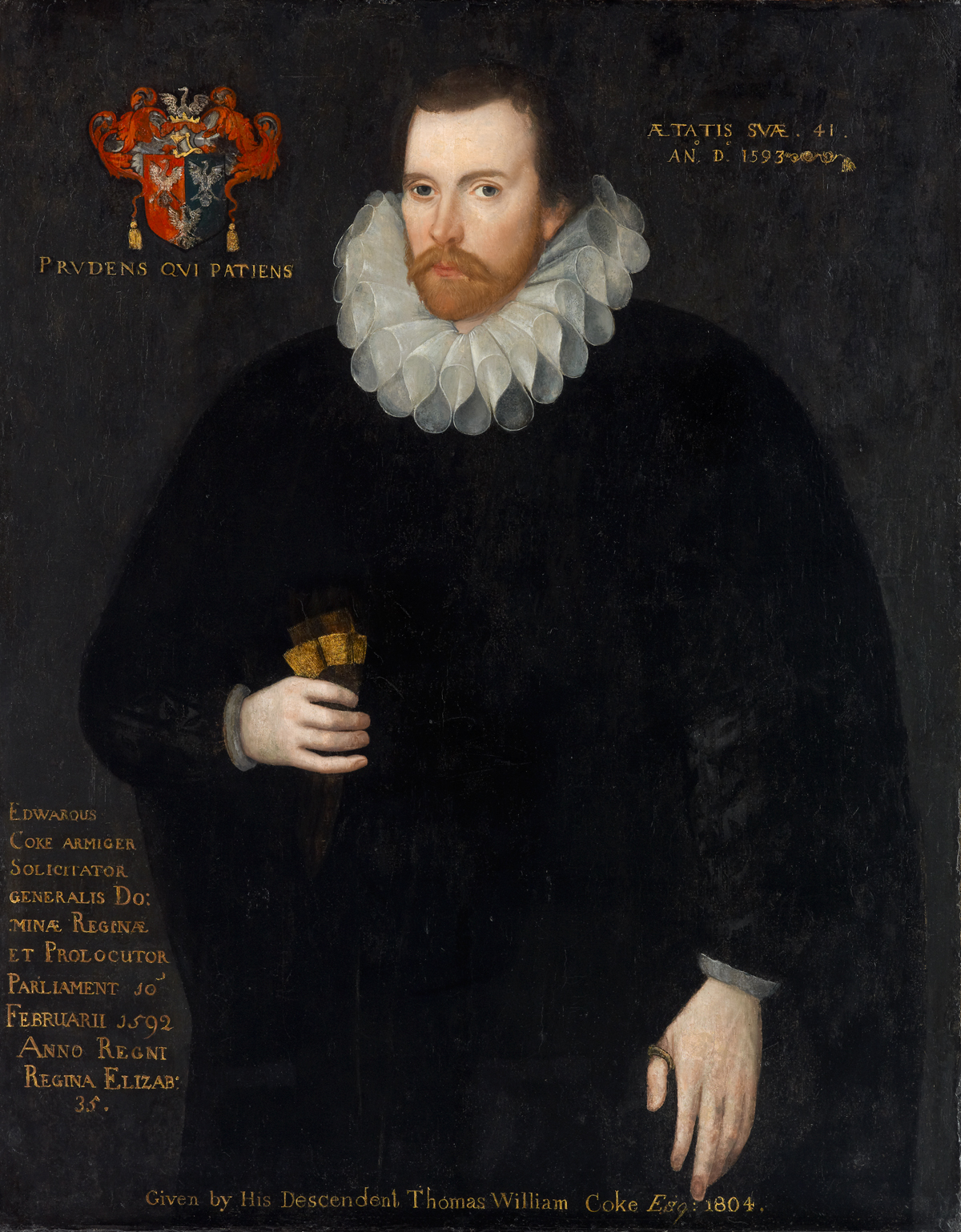
Chief Justice Coke, 17th century English jurist

=== England and the UK ===
Restraint of trade in England and the UK was and is defined as a legal contract between a buyer and a seller of a business, or between an employer and employee, that prevents the seller or employee from engaging in a similar business within a specified geographical area and within a specified period. It intends to protect trade secrets or proprietary information but is enforceable only if it is reasonable with reference to the party against whom it is made and if it is not contrary to public policy.

The restraint of trade doctrine is based on the two concepts of prohibiting agreements that run counter to public policy, unless the reasonableness of an agreement could be shown. A restraint of trade is simply some kind of agreed provision that is designed to restrain another's trade. For example, in Nordenfelt v Maxim, Nordenfelt Guns and Ammunition Co., a Swedish arms inventor promised on sale of his business to an American gun maker that he "would not make guns or ammunition anywhere in the world, and would not compete with Maxim in any way."

To be a valid restraint of trade in the first place, both parties must have provided valuable consideration for their agreement to be enforceable. In Dyer's Case a dyer had given a bond not to exercise his trade in the same town as the plaintiff for six months but the plaintiff had promised nothing in return. On hearing the plaintiff's attempt to enforce this restraint, Hull J exclaimed, "per Dieu, if the plaintiff were here, he should go to prison till he had paid a fine to the King."

The common law evolved with changing business conditions. So in the early 17th century case of Rogers v Parry it was held that a promise by a joiner not to trade from his house for 21 years was enforceable against him since the time and place was certain. It was also held (by Chief Justice Coke) that a man cannot bind himself to not use his trade generally.

This was followed in Broad v Jolyffe and Mitchel v Reynolds where Lord Macclesfield asked, "What does it signify to a tradesman in London what another does in Newcastle?" In times of such slow communications and commerce around the country it seemed axiomatic that a general restraint served no legitimate purpose for one's business and ought to be void. But already in 1880 in Roussillon v Roussillon Lord Justice Fry stated that a restraint unlimited in space need not be void, since the real question was whether it went further than necessary for the promisee's protection. So in the Nordenfelt case, Lord Macnaghten ruled that while one could validly promise to "not make guns or ammunition anywhere in the world" it was an unreasonable restraint to "not compete with Maxim in any way". This approach in England was confirmed by the House of Lords in Mason v The Provident Supply and Clothing Co.

=== United States ===
In the US, the first significant discussion occurred in the Sixth Circuit's opinion by Chief Judge (later US President and still later Supreme Court Chief Justice) William Howard Taft in United States v. Addyston Pipe & Steel Co. Judge Taft explained the Sherman Antitrust Act of 1890 as a statutory codification of the English common-law doctrine of restraint of trade, as explicated in such cases as Mitchel v Reynolds. The court distinguished between naked restraints of trade and those ancillary to the legitimate main purpose of a lawful contract and reasonably necessary to effectuation of that purpose. An example of the latter would be a non-competition clause associated with the lease or sale of a bakeshop, as in the Mitchel case. Such a contract should be tested by a "rule of reason," meaning that it should be deemed legitimate if "necessary and ancillary." An example of the naked type of restraint would be the price-fixing and bid-allocation agreements involved in the Addyston case. Taft said that "we do not think there is any question of reasonableness open to the courts to such a contract." The Supreme Court affirmed the judgment. During the following century, the Addyston Pipe opinion of Judge Taft has remained foundational in antitrust analysis.

The 1911 decision of the Supreme Court in Standard Oil Company of New Jersey v. United States relied on Taft's rule-of-reason analysis. In that case, the Court concluded that a contract offended the Sherman Act only if the contract restrained trade "unduly"—that is, if the contract resulted in monopolistic consequences. A broader meaning, the Court suggested, would ban normal and usual contracts, and would thus infringe liberty of contract. The Court therefore endorsed the rule of reason enunciated in Addyston Pipe, which in turn derived from Mitchel v Reynolds and the common law of restraints of trade.

In more recent cases, court continue to base their rulings on the Mitchel framework, but attention has turned to such issues as "necessary to do what?" and "how necessary compared to collateral damage?"

For example, even if a restraint is necessary and ancillary, within the meaning of the Mitchel and Addyston Pipe cases, it may still be an unreasonable restraint of trade if its anticompetitive effects and consequent harm to the public interest outweigh its benefits. Thus, Judge Ginsburg opined in the Polygram case:

If the only way a new product can be profitably introduced is to restrain the legitimate competition of older products, then one must seriously wonder whether consumers are genuinely benefited by the new product.

A related issue is whether, even if a restraint is necessary and ancillary, available means exist to accomplish the desired result which are less harmful. The FTC-DOJ 2000 Guidelines for Collaborations among Competitors say that, in determining whether a restraint is "reasonably necessary," the issue is "whether practical, significantly less restrictive means were reasonably available when the agreement was entered into."

In other cases, questions have been raised as to whether the restraint was necessary and ancillary to accomplishing only something unworthy of recognition, given the resulting harm involved. In one recent case, a court rejected a credit card issuer's attempted justification of a restriction against competitive dealings said to be reasonably necessary to promote "loyalty" and "cohesion." How necessary and necessary to what thus remain controverted issues under the doctrine of Mitchel v. Reynolds.

== Restraining workers ==
Under English law, restraining clauses in employment contracts are enforceable if:

- There is a legitimate interest which needs to be protected. Examples of such interests include business connections and business secrets.
- The restraint is reasonable, i.e. sufficiently protects the interest and goes no further.

Generally, if a restraining clause is found to be unreasonable, then it will be void. In certain circumstances though the court may uphold it either by construing ambiguities or by severance. Severance consists of the application of what is known as the "blue pencil test"; if individual words which make the clause excessively wide are able to be crossed out and the clause still makes grammatical sense, without altering the nature of the obligations, then the courts may be willing to sever the illegal aspects of the clause and enforce the remainder.

== Contemporary application ==
Though the restraint of trade doctrine is still valid, the current use has been limited by modern and economically oriented statutes of competition law in most countries. It remains of considerable importance in the United States as does the Mitchel v Reynolds case.

== See also ==
- History of competition law
- Unfair competition
