= Basil Zaharoff =

Greek arms dealer and industrialist (1849-1936)

Basil Zaharoff GCB GBE
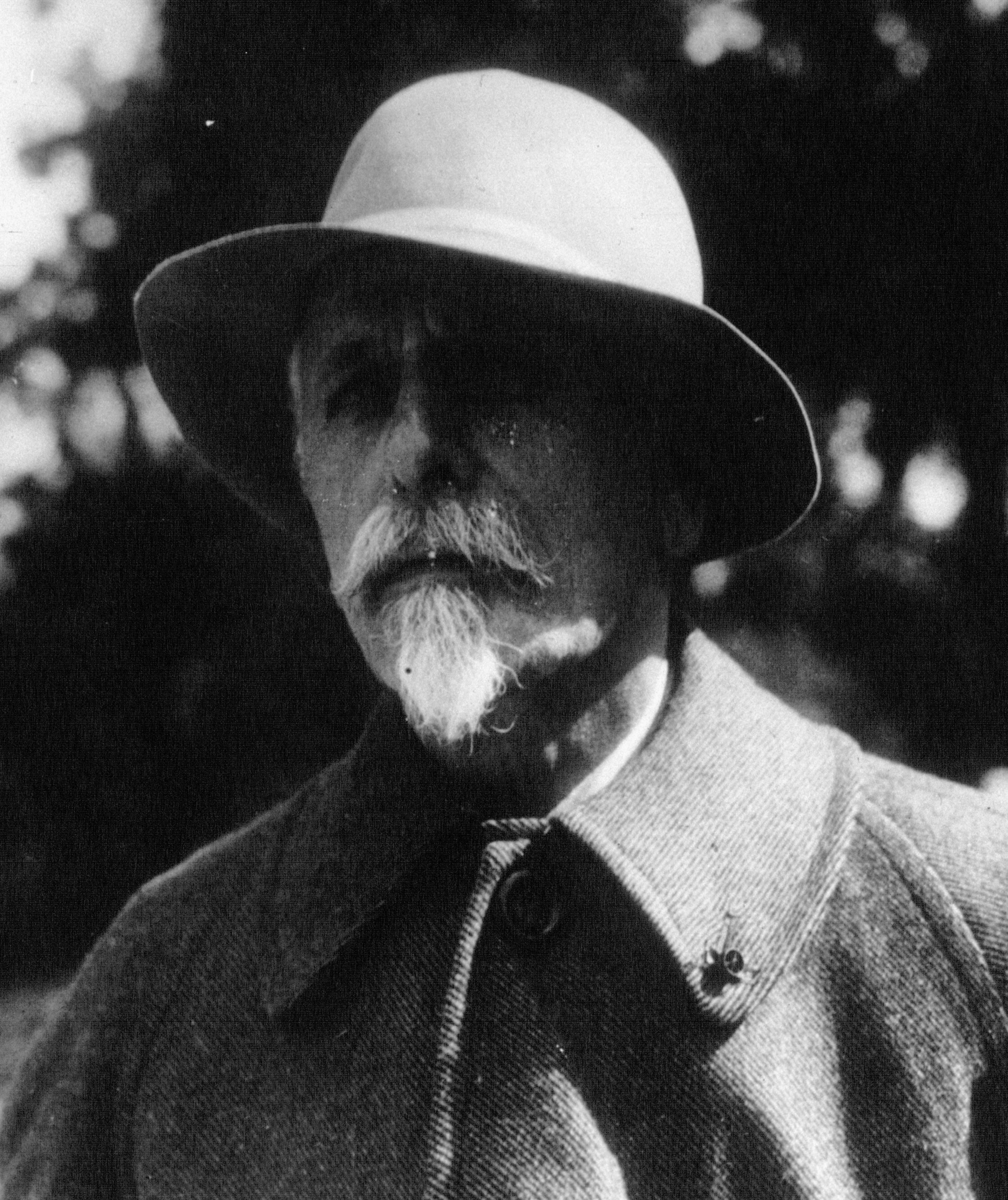
- Basil Zaharoff in 1928
- Born: Zacharias Basileios Zacharoff; 6 October 1849; Muğla, Ottoman Empire
- Died: 27 November 1936 (aged 87); Monte Carlo, Monaco
- Occupations: Arms dealer, industrialist
- Known for: Vickers

Basil Zaharoff (born Zacharias Basileios Zacharoff; 6 October 1849 – 27 November 1936) was a Greek arms dealer and industrialist. One of the richest men in the world during his lifetime, Zaharoff was described as both a "merchant of death" and a "mystery man of Europe". His success was largely due to aggressive and often unethical business tactics. These included the sale of arms to opposing sides in conflicts, sometimes delivering fake or faulty machinery and using the press to attack business rivals.

Zaharoff maintained close contacts with many powerful political leaders, including British Prime Minister David Lloyd George, Greek Prime Minister Eleftherios Venizelos and Ottoman Sultan Abdul Hamid II.

== Early life ==
Zacharias was the only son and eldest of four children of Basilius Zacharoff (d. 1878) of Constantinople, a Greek notary, commodity dealer and importer of attar of roses and his (reportedly blind) wife, Helena Antonides (d. 1879). Zacharias was born in the Ottoman Empire town of Menteşe in southwest Turkey. His family lived in Russia for over two decades as exiles following the anti-Greek "Easter pogroms" of 1821. While in Russia, their family adopted the surname Zaharoff. They returned to the Ottoman Empire in 1855, to Constantinople's Greek neighborhood of Tatavla.

Zacharias' first job was as a tour guide in the Galata. It is thought he became an arsonist with Constantinople's fire brigades, who were paid to recover or salvage treasures for their wealthy owners.

He was summoned to court in London on November 1872 due to irregular exports of goods from Constantinople to London. The London Greeks from Constantinople preferred disputes involving members of their community to be settled outside English courts, and he was discharged on the conditions that he paid £100 restitution to the claimant and remained within the court's jurisdiction. Instead, he immediately left for Athens, where the 24-year-old Zaharoff was befriended by a political journalist, Etienne Skouloudis. The eloquent Zaharoff succeeded in convincing Skouloudis of the rightness of his London court case. Skouloudis was a friend of a Swedish captain who was about to leave his job as an agent of arms manufacturer Thorsten Nordenfelt. Skouloudis used his influence to recommend Zaharoff for the role. Zaharoff was hired on 14 October 1877, beginning a spectacular career. The political and military instability in the Balkan states, Turkey and Russia provided an excellent opportunity for the arms sales, as each state spent to match the perceived aggressive intentions of its neighbours, even after the 1878 Treaty of Berlin.

== Arms dealing ==
Zaharoff did not make arms dealing his sole business at first. After Cyprus passed under British control in 1878 he returned to the United Kingdom; by 1883 he was working as a shipping agent in Galway, Ireland, where he recruited local girls for work in American factories. He also had a spell in the United States where he worked as a confidence man, and later as a salesman for a St. Louis railcar business. In 1885, posing as "Prince Zacharias Basileus Zacharoff", he married a Philadelphia heiress, Jennie Billings, and was pursued to Rotterdam by detectives after his exposure as a bigamist by a Briton who recognised him as the same man who had married a British girl in Bristol in 1872.

Zaharoff sold munitions to many nations, including Great Britain, Germany, the Russian and Ottoman Empires, Greece, Spain, Japan and the United States. Despite his reputation for corruption, he was instrumental in marketing military equipment, including various famous weapons such as the Maxim gun (one of the first fully automatic machine guns) and the first working submarine. The British-Swedish Nordenfelt produced a range of anti-torpedo boat guns in Erith, Kent, Stockholm and Spain.

Zaharoff worked for Vickers, the munitions firm, from 1897 to 1927.

=== Maxim machine gun ===
Hiram Maxim's automatic machine gun was a significant improvement over the then-current hand-cranked rotary barrel models. Maxim's gun was better than anything that Nordenfelt sold at the time. Zaharoff is believed to have had a hand in the events surrounding Maxim's attempts to demonstrate his invention between 1886 and 1888. In the first, Maxim's and Nordenfelt's machine guns were to be demonstrated at La Spezia, Italy, before a distinguished audience which included the Duke of Genoa. Maxim's representatives did not show up; a person unknown had waylaid them with a tour of La Spezia's nocturnal establishments leaving them unfit for purpose the next morning.

Round two took place at Vienna, where the exhibitors were instructed to modify their weapons to comply with Austrian Infantry-standard sized cartridges. After shooting a few hundred rounds, the Maxim gun became erratic before stopping altogether. When Maxim took one weapon apart to see what had happened, he discovered that they had been sabotaged, but it was too late to repair. A third demonstration also took place in Vienna, and here the gun worked perfectly but again an unknown person went through the gathering of senior officers, convincing them that the workmanship required to produce such a marvellous weapon could be achieved only by hand, one at a time, and that without the means for mass production, Maxim could never produce machine guns in sufficient quantities to satisfy the needs of a modern army. Nordenfelt and Zaharoff had won. Maxim, who knew he had a good product, successfully sought a merger with Nordenfelt, engaging Zaharoff as their principal salesman on a huge commission.

Under pressure from Rothschild and Vickers, Thorsten Nordenfelt merged with Maxim's in 1888 to form the Maxim Nordenfelt Guns and Ammunition Company. Two years later, a bankrupt Nordenfelt was forced out of the company.

=== Submarines ===
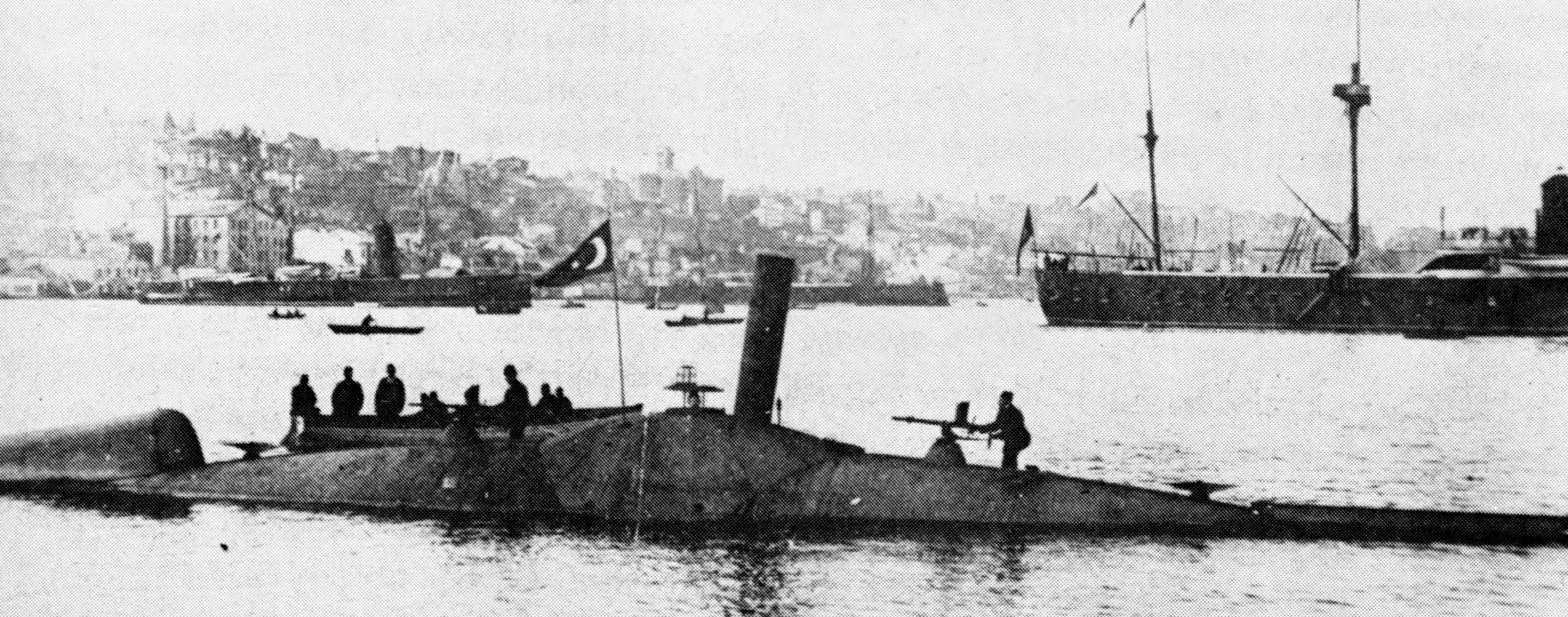
The Nordenfelt-class Ottoman submarine Abdül Hamid (1886) was the first submarine in history to fire a torpedo whilst submerged. Two submarines of this class, Nordenfelt II (Abdülhamid, 1886) and Nordenfelt III (Abdülmecid, 1887) joined the Ottoman fleet. They were built in pieces by Des Vignes (Chertsey) and Vickers (Sheffield) in England, and assembled at the Taşkızak Naval Shipyard in Istanbul, Turkey.

From 1886 to 1889, at the same time that Zaharoff got the Maxim machine gun, he managed to appropriate Isaac Peral's submarine; although these facts are less well known. Zaharoff and Nordenfelt tried at this time to develop a submarine for their own business purposes.

One of the most notorious sales by Zaharoff was that of the Nordenfelt I, a faulty steam-driven submarine model based on a design by the English inventor and clergyman George Garrett, which US Navy intelligence characterized as capable of "dangerous and eccentric movements." Thorsten Nordenfelt had already demonstrated his vessel at an international gathering of the military elite, and while the major powers would have none of it, smaller nations, attracted by the prestige, were a different matter.

It was thus that, with a promise of generous payment terms, Zaharoff sold the first model to the Greeks. He then persuaded the Turks that the Greek submarine posed a threat, selling them two. After that, he persuaded the Russians that there was now a new and significant threat on the Black Sea, and they bought another two.

None of these submarines ever saw action. The mechanics, driven by steam propulsion, were completely inadequate for underwater navigation, and failed demonstrably when undergoing sea trials by the respective navies. Besides the underlying problems of the faulty propulsion system, they were also chronically unstable. One of the Turkish Navy's submarines sank, capsizing during a torpedo firing test. The vessel reared in a vertical position, from which it sank by the stern.

At this time Spanish inventor Isaac Peral designed and built the first submarine capable of navigating underwater with a decent level of control and with the ability to launch torpedoes both submerged and on the surface. This was the first proper submarine, solving the problems of propulsion, stability and armament all at once. Peral's submarine was driven by electric propulsion, and had a periscope, target practice apparatus, compensating compass needle, gyroscope, sliding electric torpedo tube launcher and servomotor (to maintain the stability and the trim of the ship in all circumstances).

Zaharoff found out quickly about this young Spanish Naval officer's invention. Previously in shipbuilding, he had already seen the plans and memorandum reports sent by Peral to the Spanish Navy's HQ at the Defence Ministry.

Later on, during Peral's visit to London, Zaharoff tried meeting with him unsuccessfully, with the help of one of Peral's Spanish Navy fellow officers. Peral refused twice, but after several attempts, he had a meeting with Thorsten Nordenfelt, the company owner, who offered him a deal to purchase the patent of the stability servomotor. Isaac Peral rejected both offers but signed his sentence in that same instant, without knowing it.

Zaharoff then got to work with his own Machiavellian plan. The Spanish inventor, as with Maxim, suffered four sabotages during the tests: the first of them, in the previous test, in the presence of the Head of the Spanish State, but, Peral, more cautious than the North American inventor, proved successful in all of them.

Despite this, Zaharoff used underhand methods, which came to light later, and was able to cause a controversy between the inventor and his own government leading to the Spanish Government's disapproval of this submarine invention, although it would have been a formidable weapon in the conflict with the United States, several years after.

Zaharoff traveled to Spain several times between 1886 and 1890 with three objectives: boycott Peral's submarine, sell weapons to the Spanish Army, and acquire a Spanish munitions factory. He was successful in all three objectives, mainly because his initiation of an amorous relationship with Pilar de Muguiro y Beruete opened many doors for him.

Pilar's father, influential banker Fermín Muguiro, Count of Muguiro, was a close friend of the King, and leader of the Spanish Conservative Party. She was a personal friend and niece of Segismundo Moret, a leading Spanish progressive thinker and the Liberal Party Leader's right-hand man. Unhappily married to King Alfonso XII's cousin, the Spanish Grandee, Francisco de Borbón, Duke of Marchena, she had unrestricted access to the Royal Palaces. During one trip, Zaharoff was spotted at the shipyard where the Spanish submarine was being built, but the Spanish authorities "covered up" the matter.

The acquisition of one of the best Spanish armament companies, Euskalduna, located in north Spain and renamed "Placencia de las Armas Co. Ltd" was in large part thanks to his love affair (later attributing his professional success to his sexual prowess), and through establishing a powerful network among Spanish politicians, journalists and military commanders, who served his business interests well. This influential group of people took his side against the development of Isaac Peral's submarine, and the Spanish Government, despite the astounding success in sea trials, finally pulled the rug from the project.

After "Placencia de Armas Co. Ltd" swindled the Spanish Government by selling useless arms during the 1898 War (also handing Maxim important and "sensitive" information, which reached his government during the conflict), the Sociedad Española de Construcciones Navales in Spain, a branch of Vickers were awarded, by the Spanish Government, exclusive naval construction rights for the Spanish Navy.

In the aftermath of this scandal, accusations of bribery and manipulation flew in the direction of this dangerous trafficker of weapons. A Spanish Navy lawyer denounced the Spanish Government for two alleged crimes of "prevarication." The Spanish Government acted expeditiously and especially cruelly against any naval officers who went public with their discontent. The Central Chief of Staff and the head of the Armada Juridic Service were fired, and hundreds of officers were imprisoned and lost their jobs.

=== Other corrupt business tactics ===
Zaharoff's power and influence in Spain lasted until his death in 1936, the year in which the Spanish Civil War began.

Also, the 1934 United States Senate Nye Committee Memorandum shows that Zaharoff was paid considerable sums for transactions made between foreign companies and the Spanish Government (for example, he got paid between a 5 and 7% commission for the price of American submarines sold to Spain, throughout all these years).

Although very little could be proved, Zaharoff was viewed as a master of bribery and corruption, but the few incidents that did become public, such as the large bribes received by Japanese Admiral Fuji in the 1914 Siemens scandal, indicated that a lot more was going on behind the scenes. In 1890, the Maxim-Nordenfelt association broke up, and Zaharoff chose to go with Maxim. Using his commissions, Zaharoff bought shares in Maxim's company until he was in a position to tell Maxim that he was no longer an employee, but an equal shareholder.

By 1897, the Maxim company had become important enough that it received a buyout offer from Vickers, one of the then giants of the armaments industry. This involved substantial settlements in both cash and shares for Maxim and Zaharoff. From then until 1911, while Maxim's business enthusiasm waned, Zaharoff's enthusiasm grew, and he expanded his portfolio of Vickers shares. After Maxim's retirement, Zaharoff was appointed to Vickers' board of directors.

The 1900s (decade) was a time for many European armies to rebuild and modernize. Germany and the United Kingdom both sought improved naval capability, and Vickers, with Zaharoff, were willing and able to service both sides. After its disastrous defeat by Japan in 1905, the Russian Navy also needed new equipment, but Russia was handcuffed by a wave of protectionism that required domestic industry for the rebuilding. Zaharoff's response was to build a huge Russian arms production complex at Tsaritsyn as a subsidiary of Vickers.

The opening of Russian Tsarist archives after World War I led to some insights into the tactics of the arms industry. One 1907 letter, in particular, was written from the Paul von Gontard Factory (a secretly-controlled Vickers company in Germany) to a Vickers-associate in Paris recommending that press releases be sent out to the French press suggesting that the French improve their military to meet the threat posed by German re-armament. These French newspaper articles were recorded by the Reichstag, and instigated a vote to increase military spending, all of which worked to the advantage of Zaharoff.

== World War I ==
In the years immediately preceding World War I, Zaharoff's fortunes grew in other areas to support his arms business. By purchasing the L'Union Parisienne des Banques (Union Parisienne Bank), which was historically associated with heavy industry, he was better able to control his financing arrangements. By gaining control of Excelsior, the popular French daily newspaper, he could guarantee favourable editorials for the arms industry. To gain public recognition and acclaim, he founded a retirement home for ex-French Navy sailors, while a chair in Aerodynamics at the University of Paris led to further honours.

In April 1914, Australian newspapers published reports from London dated 25 April that M. Zaharoff had donated £20,000 "in order to enable France to be worthily represented at the forthcoming Olympic Games in Berlin" in 1916. The 1916 Olympic Games were subsequently cancelled because of the war. Zaharoff's donation represented a substantial contribution. On 10 May, the French Government announced it would donate £6,000 to its Olympic team, and would distribute £12,000 of Zaharoff's donation among its Olympic teams, with the remaining £8,000 to "the furtherance of the Olympic cause."

On 31 July 1914, coincidentally the same day that the noted antimilitarist Jean Jaurès was assassinated, Raymond Poincaré signed a decree appointing Zaharoff a Commander of the Legion of Honour.

In March 1914, Vickers announced a new dawn of prosperity. During the course of the war, Vickers would produce 4 ships of the line, 3 cruisers, 53 submarines, 3 auxiliary vessels, 62 light vessels, 2,328 cannon, 8,000,000 tonnes of steel ordnance, 90,000 mines, 22,000 torpedoes, 5,500 airplanes and 100,000 machine guns. By 1915, Zaharoff had close ties with both David Lloyd George and Aristide Briand. It is reported that, on the occasion of one visit with Briand, Zaharoff surreptitiously left an envelope on Aristide Briand's desk; the envelope contained a million francs for war widows.

One of Zaharoff's tasks during the Great War was to ensure that Greece joined the war on the Allied side, helping to reinforce the eastern front. On the surface, this seemed impossible since King Constantine was a brother-in-law of the Kaiser. Setting up a press agency in Greece to publicise British propaganda contacted by Wellington House, Zaharoff led, within a few months, to King Constantine's overthrow by Prime Minister Eleftherios Venizelos and Greek entry into the war as an ally of the British Empire.

In 1917 and 1918, on the behest of David Lloyd George, Zaharoff initiated a series of secret peace negotiations with the Ottoman Empire, beginning on 18 July 1917. The British hoped Zaharoff could convince the Three Pashas to abandon the Central Powers and make a separate peace with the Allies.

By the end of World War I, The Times estimated that Zaharoff had laid out £50 million in the Allied cause.

== Post-war dealings ==
In the years that followed, Zaharoff involved himself in the affairs of the lesser powers, which the Big Four, involved in remaking Europe, could happily ignore. In particular, he set out to ensure that Greece and Venizelos received a proper share from the spoils from the badly weakened Turkey. In 1920, he donated half a billion gold francs to the Greek State for the Greek cause (Megali Idea). Zaharoff convinced Venizelos to attack but, after some impressive initial success, the Greek Army was eventually driven back. In the elections that followed, Constantine's loyalists managed to force Venizelos to flee, but Zaharoff stayed around to persuade the same King that he had to attack Turkey again but with Mustafa Kemal now in charge of Turkey, this venture was bound to fail. Zaharoff's war adventures were not well received by the press in Paris and London.

Zaharoff was also involved in two more significant financial ventures in October 1920, becoming involved in the incorporation of a company that was a predecessor to oil giant BP. He foresaw that there was a great future in the oil business.

His association with Prince Louis II of Monaco led to his purchase of the debt-ridden Société des Bains de Mer, which ran the world-famous Monte Carlo Casino and was the principal source of revenue for the principality. He succeeded in returning the casino to profit again. At the same time, Zaharoff had prevailed upon Clemenceau to ensure that the Treaty of Versailles included protection of Monaco’s rights as established in 1641. Louis had noted their gradual erosion over the subsequent three centuries.

== Personal life ==
Zaharoff was fascinated by aviation, and gave money and other support to pioneers in Great Britain, France and Russia. He encouraged Hiram Maxim's attempt to build a flying machine, and claimed he and Maxim were the first men to be lifted off the earth, when Maxim tested his first "flying machine" at Bexley in 1894.

Zaharoff was a good friend of fellow Greek Jacques Damala, from the noble Zaccaria de Damalà family, and his wife, world famous stage actress Sarah Bernhardt, and took in Damala's illegitimate daughter with a theatre extra after she was left in a basket on Bernhardt's doorstep. Eventually, this girl was baptised Tereza (1889–1967) and was raised by a surrogate family that Zaharoff found for her in Adrianople, in Eastern Thrace, later becoming a socialite in royal Athens society, and an impactful lover of both Ernest Hemingway, who called a her a "Greek princess", and Gabriele d'Annunzio, as well getting acquainted with Benito Mussolini, and serving as a model for Pablo Picasso in the early 20th century. The life of Tereza Damalas, including having been Zaharoff's ward and lifelong friend was the subject of the historical novel Tereza, by Greek journalist Freddy Germanos.

In September 1924, Zaharoff, 74, married his mistress María del Pilar Antonia Angela Patrocinio Fermina Simona de Muguiro y Beruete, 55, in her own right 1st Duchess de Villafranca de los Caballeros. Previously married to a cousin of the King of Spain Alfonso XII, the Duchess was reputed to be one of the richest women in Spain.

Zaharoff's country house, the Château de Balincourt, at Arronville near Paris, was formerly the property of King Leopold II of Belgium and was filled with works of art and one of the most beautiful in France.

Princess Marthe Bibesco claimed Basil Zaharoff was an illegitimate son of her maternal grandfather.

== Philanthropy ==
Zaharoff was a major financial benefactor to various institutions:

- Chair of Aviation at the University of Paris (cost: FF 700,000)
- Chair of Aviation at Saint Petersburg State University
- Chair of Aviation at Imperial College, London
- Chair of French Literature at Oxford University
- Chair of English Literature at the University of Paris
- Donation of £20,000 to refurbish Paris Zoo's monkey house (initially treated as a hoax by Zoo staff who left the cheque in a drawer for two months)
- Financial contribution to studying aviation problems in England (cost: £125,000)
- The construction of a War Hospital at Biarritz (FF 200,000)
- Donation towards building the Greek Embassy in Paris
- Help for the earthquake victims at Corinth, Greece
- Establishing the Institut Pasteur à Athènes in 1919

== Honours ==
- Grand Cross, Legion of Honour
- Honorary Knight Grand Cross, Order of the Bath ("George V, who detested him, resented his use of titles, which, as a French citizen, were only honorary")
- Honorary Knight Grand Cross, Order of the British Empire
- Grand Cross, Order of the Redeemer

== In popular culture ==
- Zaharoff was portrayed by Leo McKern in the 1983 ITV series Reilly, Ace of Spies.
- Zaharoff was depicted in the "Lanny Budd" series by reformer Upton Sinclair.
- Zaharoff appears in the Thomas Pynchon novel Against the Day.
- 'Zaroff' is an unscrupulous arms dealer in the Tom Mix serial The Miracle Rider (1935).
- Zaharoff is played by Serhat Tutumluer in the Turkish crime and detective movie series 'Filinta', portraying crime, secrets and action in late 19th century Ottoman era Constantinople.
- Zaharoff is portrayed as a main antagonist in Jacopo Della Quercia's 2015 novel The Great Abraham Lincoln Pocket Watch Conspiracy.
- Zaharoff is played by Adnan Biricik as a weapons dealer and an antagonist on Season 1 of the Turkish Drama series 'Payitaht: Abdülhamid'
- In the 2019 Greek series To Kokkino Potami, Zaharoff, portrayed by Sotiris Hatzakis, is depicted as a pivotal figure in the protagonist's life, urging him to follow him to Paris and become his right-hand man.
- Zaharoff was used by Ian Fleming as the model for Ernst Stavro Blofeld leader of the international criminal organization SPECTRE and a main antagonist in the James Bond series of novels and films.
- Zaharoff was the model for Hergé's corrupt arms dealer character Basil Bazaroff in Tintin and the Broken Ear (1937)

== See also ==
- List of Legion of Honour recipients by name (Z)
- Legion of Honour Museum

== Sources ==
- Insall, Tony; Maiolo, Joseph (December 2012). "Sir Basil Zaharoff and Sir Vincent Caillard as Instruments of British Policy towards Greece and the Ottoman Empire during the Asquith and Lloyd George Administrations, 1915–8". The International History Review. 34 (4). Taylor & Francis, Ltd.: 819–839. doi:10.1080/07075332.2012.690200. ISSN 1949-6540. JSTOR 24701359. OCLC 827256360. S2CID 154352381.
