= Maxim Nordenfelt Guns and Ammunition Company =

UK arms manufacturer

- Industry: Armaments
- Founded: 1888
- Defunct: 1897
- Fate: Acquired
- Successor: Vickers, Sons and Maxim
- Headquarters: 32 Victoria Street SW, London, UK
- Products: Machine guns Artillery; Ammunition

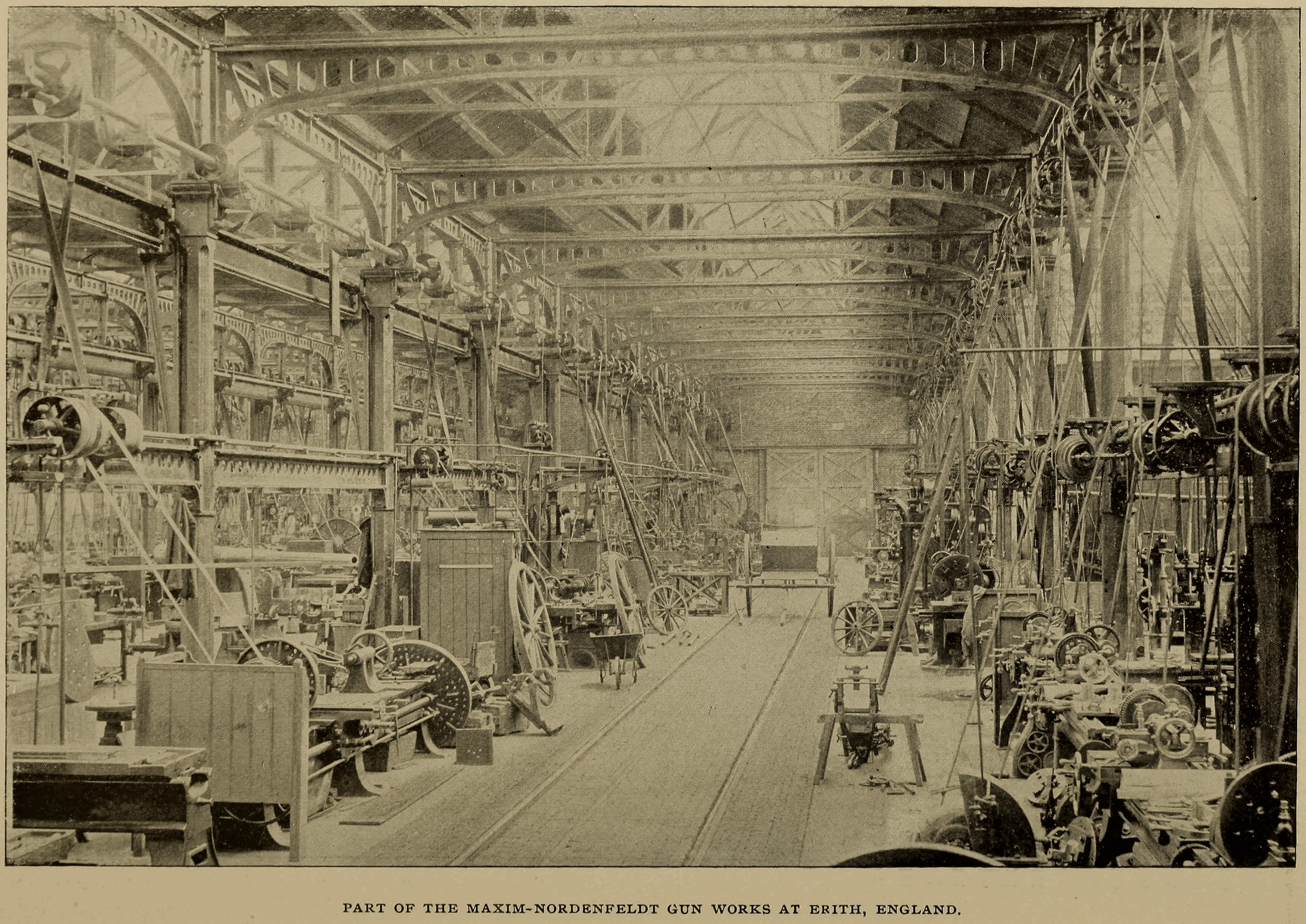
Interior from the gun factory at Erith, featured in Cassier's Magazine, April 1895.

The Maxim-Nordenfelt Guns and Ammunition Company was the result of a takeover by Hiram Maxim of Thorsten Nordenfelt's Nordenfelt Guns and Ammunition Company in 1888. Rothschild issued £1.9 million (1888) (equivalent to £264.1 million or US$337.54 million in 2024) worth of shares to finance the merger. Nathan Rothschild retained a substantial shareholding in the new Maxim-Nordenfelt combine and ‘exerted a direct influence over its management’.

== History ==
The company produced a range of light artillery, machine guns and ammunition.

It was the subject of one of history's most famous court cases in 1894, Nordenfelt v Maxim, Nordenfelt Guns and Ammunition Co, in which Nordenfelt successfully claimed that the takeover condition preventing him from competing with Maxim for 25 years "in any way" was an unreasonable restraint of trade, but failed to overturn the main condition preventing Nordenfelt from competing with Maxim in the guns and ammunition trade for 25 years.

The company competed against the Armstrong subsidiary Elswick Ordnance Company's range of armaments, which included Hotchkiss guns made under licence.

The company became part of the Barrow Shipbuilding Company, which was taken over by Vickers, Sons and Company in 1897 to form Vickers, Sons & Maxim. This gave Vickers a complete naval shipbuilding, engineering and armaments capability, an advantage Armstrongs had held for many years, and eventually allowed Vickers to take over Armstrongs.

During the Second Boer War, the British used Maxim machine guns, and the Boers used the QF 1-pounder, a modified Maxim, a belt-fed, water-cooled machine gun that fired explosive 1-pound (0.45 kg) rounds (smokeless ammunition) at 450 rounds per minute, which became known as the "pom-pom".

== See also ==
- Second Boer War
- Boer Commando
