= QF 1-pounder pom-pom =

QF 1 pdr Mark I & II ("pom-pom")
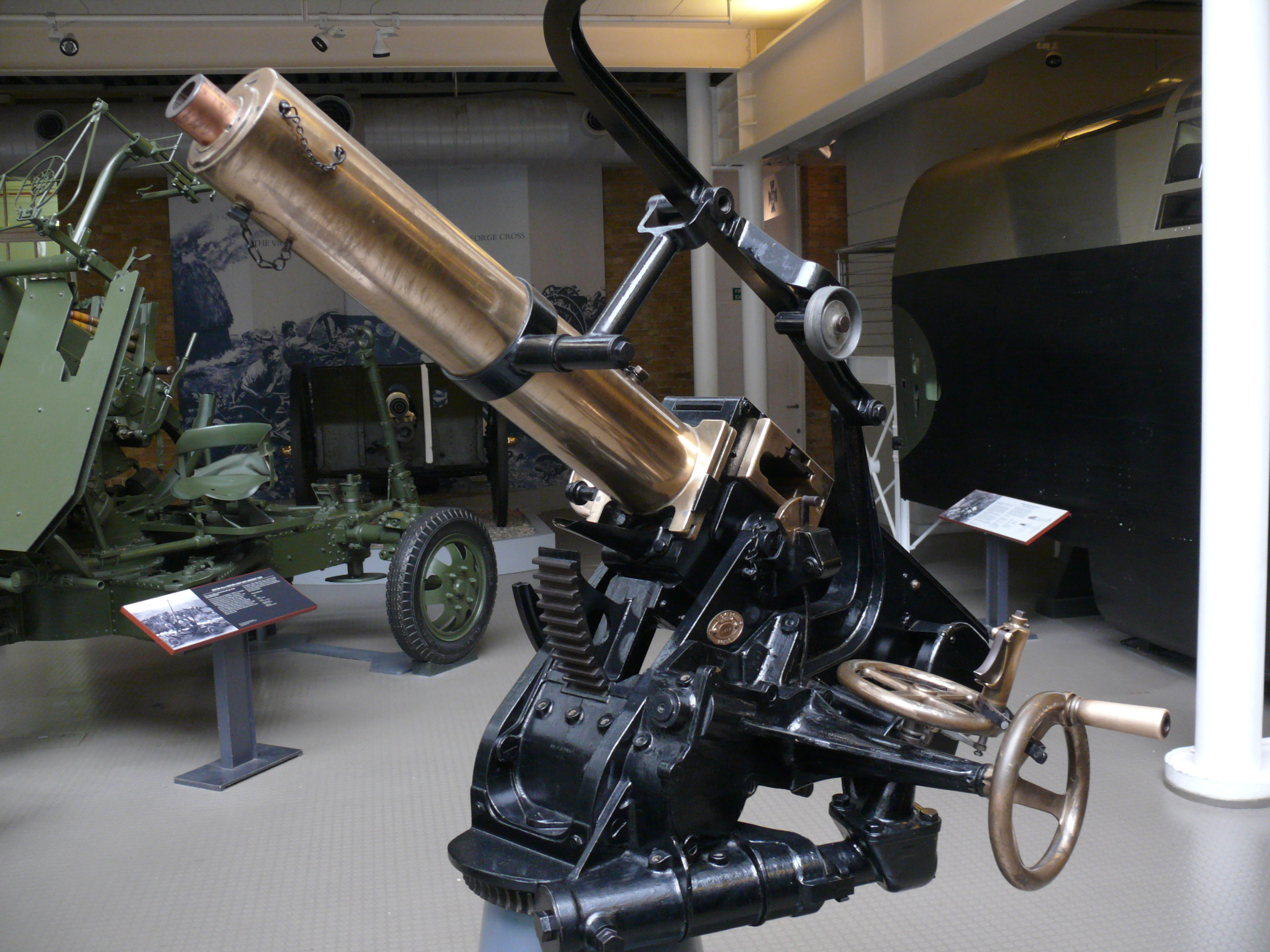
- Mk II gun dated 1903, on anti-aircraft mounting, at the Imperial War Museum, London.
- Type: Autocannon
- Place of origin: United Kingdom

Service history
- In service: 1890s–1918
- Used by: South African Republic; British Empire; Khedivate of Egypt; German Empire; Paraguay; Belgium; United States; Finland; Bolivia; Qing Dynasty; China; El Salvador; Guatemala; Honduras; Nicaragua
- Wars: Mahdist War; Spanish–American War; Second Boer War; 1904 Paraguayan Revolution; Herero Wars; World War I Finnish Civil War; Chaco War; Winter War; Second Sino-Japanese War

Production history
- Designer: Hiram Maxim
- Designed: Late 1880s
- Manufacturer: Maxim-Nordenfelt; Vickers, Sons & Maxim; DWM
- Variants: Mk I, Mk II

Specifications
- Mass: 410 pounds (186.0 kg) (gun & breech)
- Length: 6 ft 1 in (1.85 m) (total)
- Barrel length: 3 ft 7 in (1.09 m) (bore) L/29
- Shell: 37 x 94R Common Shell
- Shell weight: 1 lb (0.45 kg)
- Calibre: 37-millimetre (1.457 in)
- Barrels: 1
- Action: automatic, recoil
- Rate of fire: ~300 rpm (cyclic)
- Muzzle velocity: 1,800 ft/s (550 m/s)
- Maximum firing range: 4,500 yards (4,110 m) (Mk I+ on field carriage)
- Filling weight: 270 grains (17 g) black powder

The QF 1 pounder, universally known as the pom-pom due to the sound of its discharge, was a 37 mm British autocannon, the first of its type in the world. It was used by several countries initially as an infantry gun and later as a light anti-aircraft gun.

== History ==
Hiram Maxim originally designed the Pom-Pom in the late 1880s as an enlarged version of the Maxim machine gun. Its longer range necessitated exploding projectiles to judge range, which in turn dictated a shell weight of at least 400 grams (0.88 lb), as that was the lightest exploding shell allowed under the Saint Petersburg Declaration of 1868 and reaffirmed in the Hague Convention of 1899.

Early versions were sold under the Maxim-Nordenfelt label, whereas versions in British service (i.e. from 1900) were labelled Vickers, Sons and Maxim (VSM), as Vickers had bought out Maxim-Nordenfelt in 1897, but they are the same gun.

== Service by nation ==
=== Belgium ===
The Belgian Army used the gun on a high-angle field carriage mounting.

=== Finland ===
About 60 were built by Finnish company Ab H. Ahlberg & Co O during World War 1 for the Russian army, and when the Finnish civil war ended about half of these were still unfinished and thus remained in Finland. The White Army captured a total of 50–60 guns in the Civil War of 1918. The guns used a column mount designed for naval use. It offered 360-degree traverse and about 70-degree elevation, allowing them to theoretically be used as antiaircraft guns.

The Finns managed to get over 30 of the captured guns to working order and they were used in warships and coastal artillery fortifications. Two of these guns also saw service in armoured trains from 1918 to late 1930s. The weapon was never popular in Finnish use as it was unreliable and had quite a short range. Main reason for the short range was in 37 mm x 94R ammunition (with moderate muzzle velocity of only about 440 m/sec), which did not really have the ballistics needed for proper antiaircraft-use. The reliability of old fuses used in their high-explosive shells also proved questionable.

During World War 2 some of these guns were used in coastal artillery forts, where their unsuitability for anti-aircraft use became painfully obvious. However, the guns proved somewhat reliable when fired with only low elevation. This was likely because shooting with low elevation did not stress their fabric ammunition belts as much as shooting with higher elevation. Their theoretical rate of fire was around 200–250 rounds per minute and maximum range around 4,400 metres.

Finnish coastal defence decided to use them mainly as close-range defence weapons of its coastal forts against surface targets, and these old guns proved somewhat successful in this role. Still, since the coastal forts had rather limited number of anti-aircraft weapons, when needed these guns were also used against enemy aircraft. At least one plane was downed by such weapons; the Humaljoki Coastal Artillery Battery in Karelian Isthmus shot down a Soviet bomber with a 37 mm Maxim automatic cannon on 25 December 1939. By that time they were outdated, so the last remaining 16 guns were scrapped soon after the Continuation War ended in 1944.

=== Germany ===
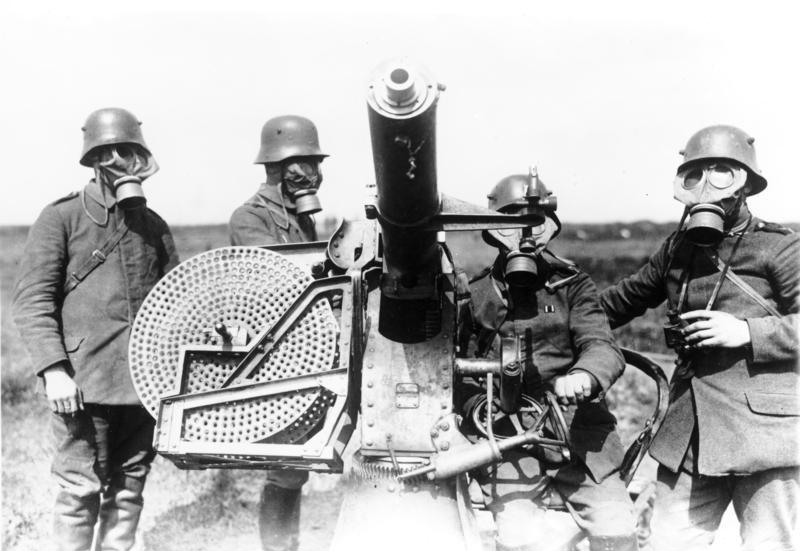
German gunners wearing gasmasks, with Maxim Flak M14

A version was produced in Germany for both Navy and Army.

In World War I, it was used in Europe as an anti-aircraft gun as the Maxim Flak M14. Four guns were used mounted on field carriages in the German South West Africa campaign in 1915, against South African forces.

=== United Kingdom ===
==== South African War ====
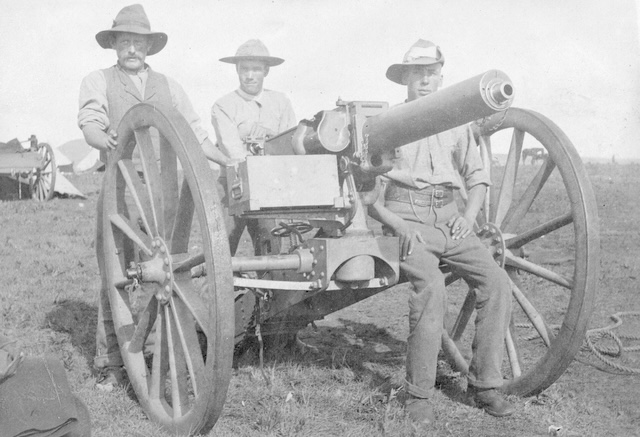
Australian troopers with a captured 1-pounder in South Africa circa. 1901

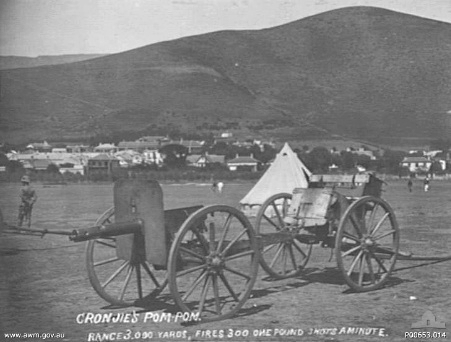
Boer 1-pounder with shield

The British government initially rejected the gun but other countries bought it, including the South African Republic (Transvaal) government who imported 22 guns between 1895 and 1899. In the Second Boer War, the British found themselves being fired on by the Boers with these British-made 37 mm Maxim-Nordenfelt versions at battles like Colenso and Spionkop. The Boers' Maxim was the same large calibre, belt-fed, water-cooled machine gun, but mounted on a wheeled field gun carriage. It fired high-explosive and armor-piercing rounds (smokeless ammunition) at 450 rounds per minute, which were especially effective against cavalry and armored trains.

Vickers-Maxim shipped either 57 or 50 guns out to the British Army in South Africa, with the first three arriving in time for the Battle of Paardeberg of February 1900. These Mk I versions were mounted on typical field gun type carriages.

==== World War I ====
In World War I, it was used as an early anti-aircraft gun in the home defence of Britain. It was adapted as the Mk I*** and Mk II on high-angle pedestal mountings and deployed along London docks and on rooftops on key buildings in London, others mobile, on motor lorries at key towns in the East and Southeast of England. 25 were employed in August 1914, and 50 in February 1916. A Mk II gun (now in the Imperial War Museum, London) on a Naval pedestal mounting was the first to open fire in defence of London during the war. However, the shell was too small to damage the German Zeppelin airships sufficiently to bring them down. The Ministry of Munitions noted in 1922: "The pom-poms were of very little value. There was no shrapnel available for them, and the shell provided for them would not burst on aeroplane fabric but fell back to earth as solid projectiles ... were of no use except at a much lower elevation than a Zeppelin attacking London was likely to keep".

Lieutenant O. F. J. Hogg of No. 2 AA Section in III Corps was the first anti-aircraft gunner to shoot down an aircraft, with 75 rounds on 23 September 1914 in France. The British Army did not employ it as an infantry weapon in World War I, as its shell was considered too small for use against any objects or fortifications and British doctrine relied on shrapnel fired by QF 13 pounder and 18-pounder field guns as its primary medium range anti-personnel weapon. The gun was experimentally mounted on aircraft as the lighter 1-pounder Mk III, the cancelled Vickers E.F.B.7 having been designed to carry it in its nose. As a light anti-aircraft gun, it was quickly replaced by the larger QF 1 1/2 pounder and QF 2 pounder naval guns.

==== British ammunition ====
The British are reported to have initially used some common pointed shells (semi-armour piercing, with fuse in the shell base) in the Boer War, in addition to the standard common shell. The common pointed shell proved unsatisfactory, with the base fuse frequently working loose and falling out during flight. In 1914, the cast-iron common shell and tracer were the only available rounds.

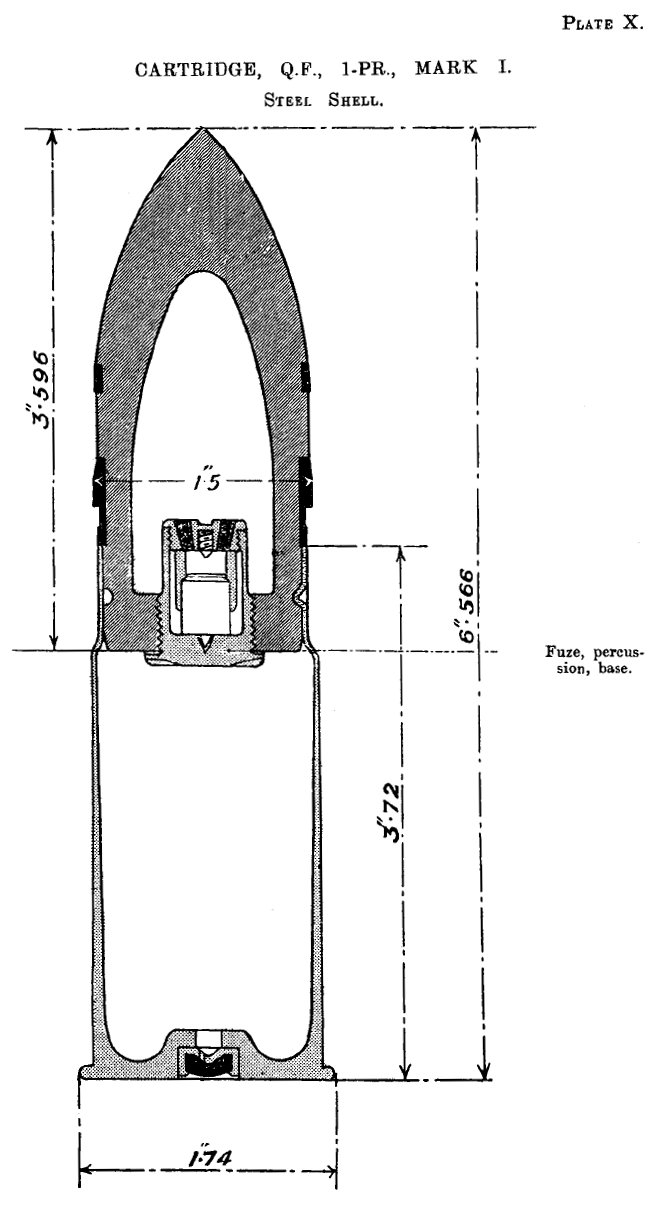
Mk I Steel shell, 1902

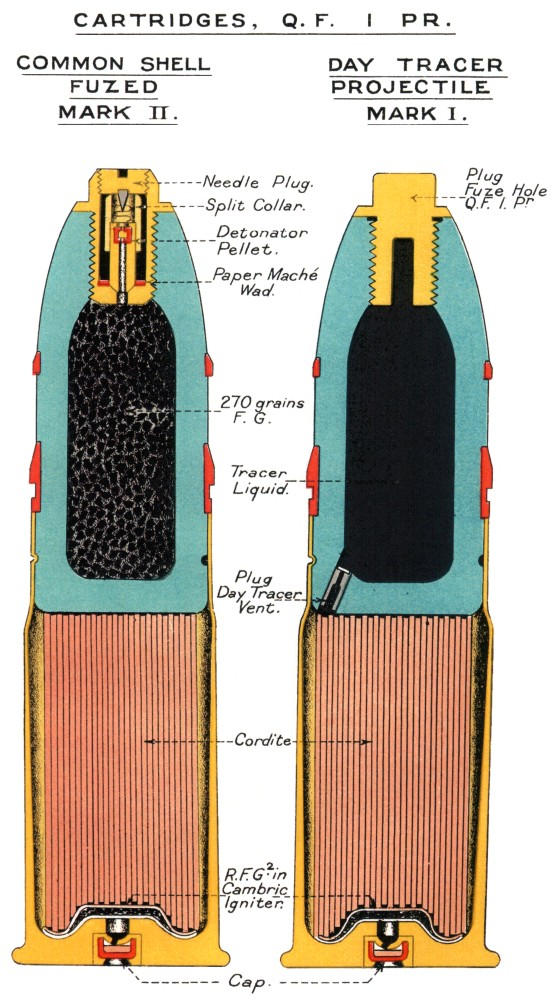
Mk II explosive Common shell & Mk I tracer round, 1914

=== United States ===
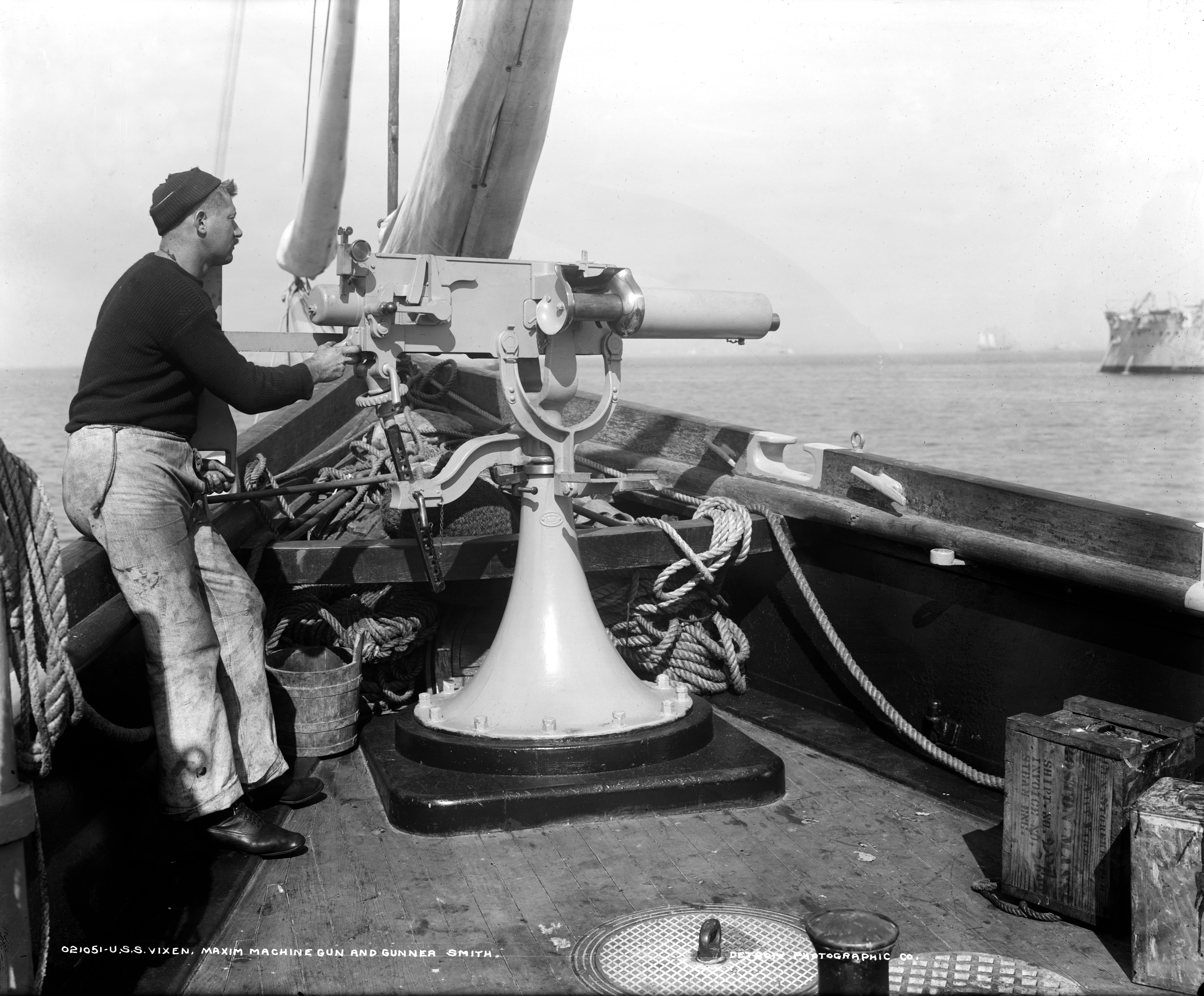
A 1-pounder aboard USS Vixen, c. 1898—1901

The US Navy adopted the Maxim-Nordenfelt 37 mm 1-pounder as the 1-pounder Mark 6 before the 1898 Spanish–American War. The Mark 7, 9, 14, and 15 weapons were similar. It was the first dedicated anti-aircraft (AA) gun adopted by the US Navy, specified as such on the Sampson class destroyers launched in 1916–17. It was deployed on various types of ships during the US participation in World War I, although it was replaced as the standard AA gun on new destroyers by the 3-inch (76 mm)/23-caliber gun.

The United States Army procured a small number of Maxim-Nordenfelt pieces for usage as mountain artillery during the Philippine–American War.

Previously, with the advent of the steel-hulled "New Navy" in 1884, some ships were equipped with the 1-pounder Hotchkiss revolving cannon.

In the aftermath of the Battle of Blair Mountain, the United States Army deployed artillery, including pompoms: "Their armament was strengthened with a howitzer and two pompoms."

Rapid-firing (single shot, similar to non-automatic QF guns) 1-pounders were also used, including the Sponsell gun and eight other marks; the Mark 10 to be mounted on aircraft. Designs included Hotchkiss and Driggs-Schroeder. A semi-automatic weapon and a line-throwing version were also adopted. Semi-automatic in this case meant a weapon in which the breech was opened and cartridge ejected automatically after firing, ready for manual loading of the next round.

It is often difficult to determine from references whether "1-pounder RF" refers to single-shot, revolving cannon, or Maxim-Nordenfelt weapons.

== Surviving examples ==
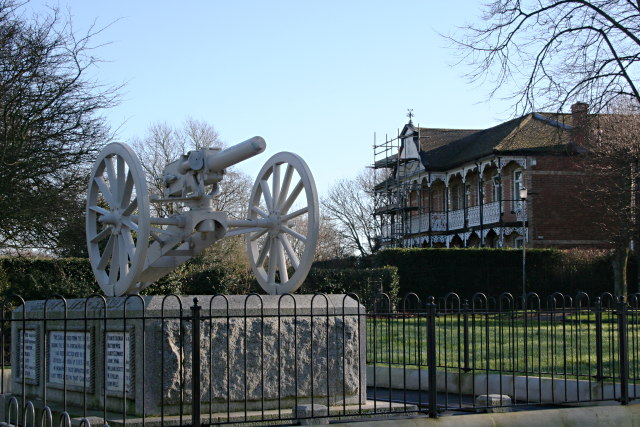
Devonport Park (2008)

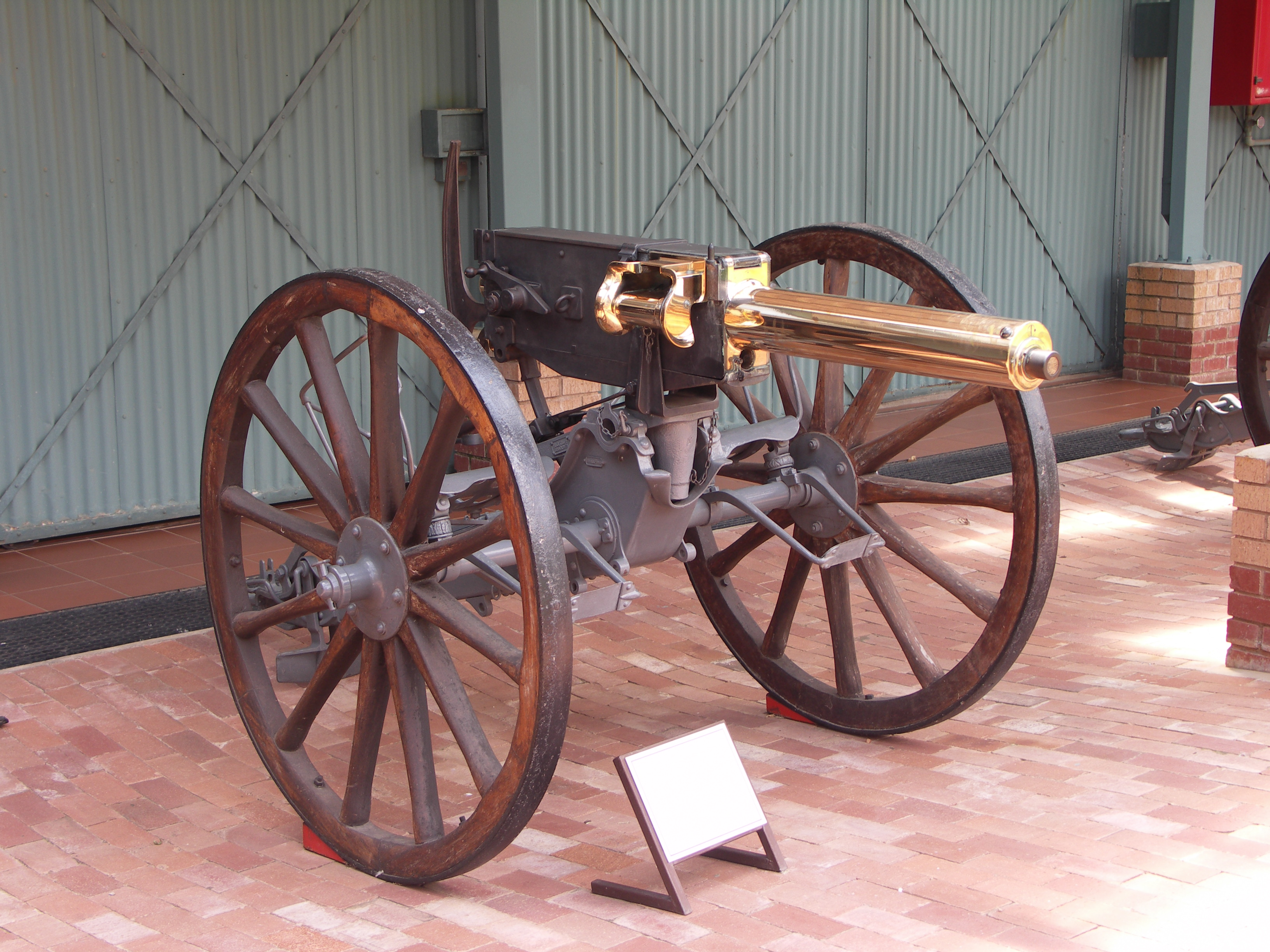
Gun 543 mounted on field gun carriage, South African National Museum of Military History (2007)

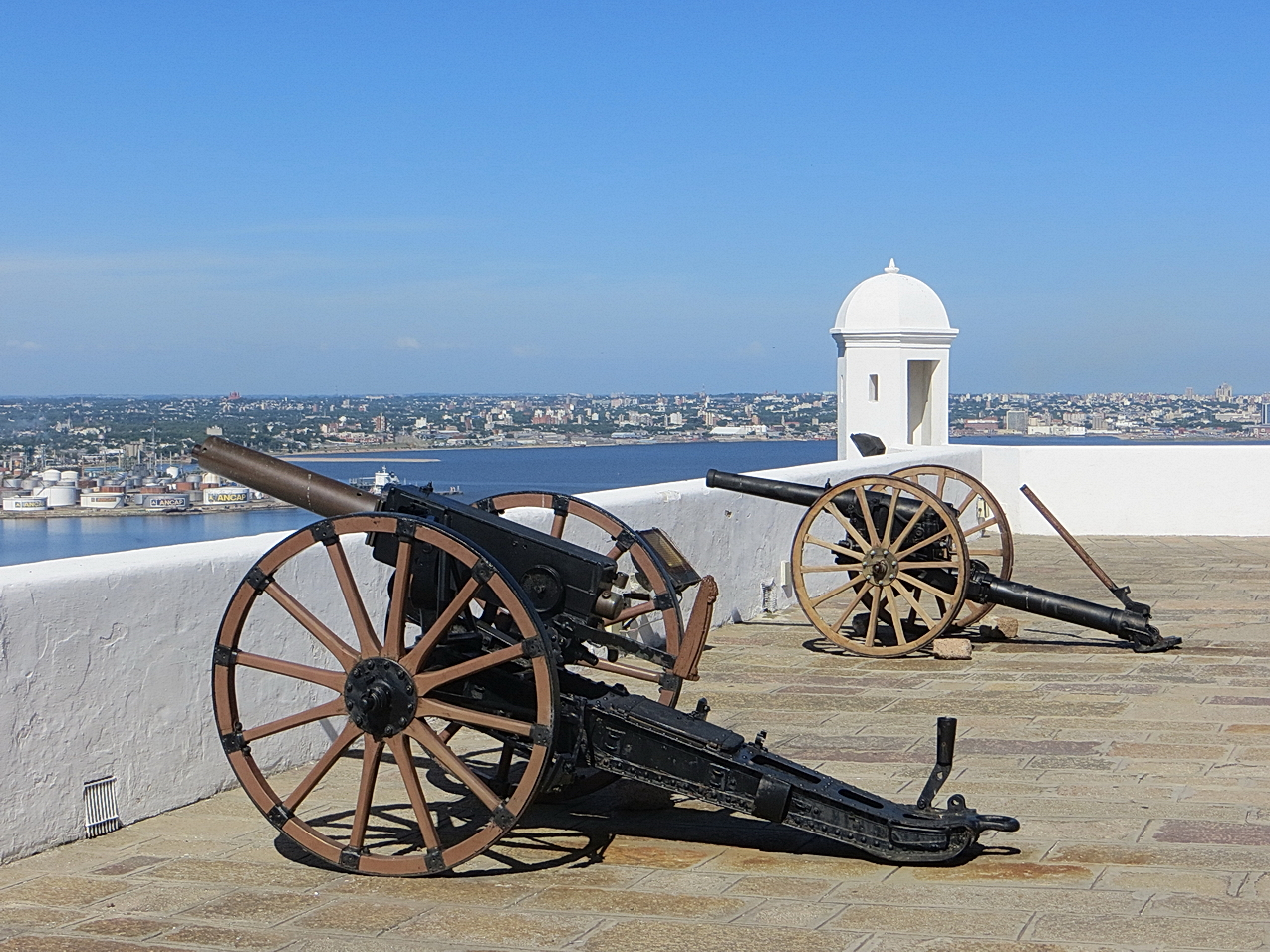
An Uruguayan cañón automático Vickers-Maxim (foreground)

- A gun from 1903 at the Imperial War Museum London.
- Two German-manufactured 1903 guns used during World War I are on display at the South African National Museum of Military History, Johannesburg. Nr. 542 and 543 from the Deutsche Waffen- und Munitionsfabriken.
- A German-manufactured gun in the Wehrtechnische Studiensammlung Koblenz, Germany.
- A gun in Bridgton, Maine, US.
- An early Maxim-Nordenfelt gun, no. 2024, is currently on display at the American Heritage Museum in Stow, Massachusetts, US.
- A gun in the Canadian War Museum.
- A gun in the Museo Naval y Maritimo Valparaiso, Chile.
- A gun at the War Museum in Newport News, Virginia, US. It is still on field mount. Flak M14
- A gun at the Royal Danish Arsenal Museum in Copenhagen, Denmark.
- A gun at Istanbul Navy Muzeum.
- A gun at Fortaleza del Cerro, Uruguay

== See also ==
- COW 37 mm gun
- List of anti-aircraft guns
- List of infantry guns

== Bibliography ==
- "Handbook of the 1-PR. Q.F. Gun (Mounted on Field Carriage)" War Office, UK, 1902.
- General Sir Martin Farndale, History of the Royal Regiment of Artillery: The Forgotten Fronts and the Home Base, 1914–18. London: Royal Artillery Institution, 1988. ISBN 1-870114-05-1
- I.V. Hogg & L.F. Thurston, British Artillery Weapons & Ammunition 1914–1918. London: Ian Allan, 1972. ISBN 978-0-7110-0381-1
- Brigadier N.W. Routledge, History of the Royal Regiment of Artillery: Anti-Aircraft Artillery, 1914–55. London: Brassey's, 1994. ISBN 1-85753-099-3
