= Ottoman submarine Abdül Hamid =

19th-century naval watercraft built in England

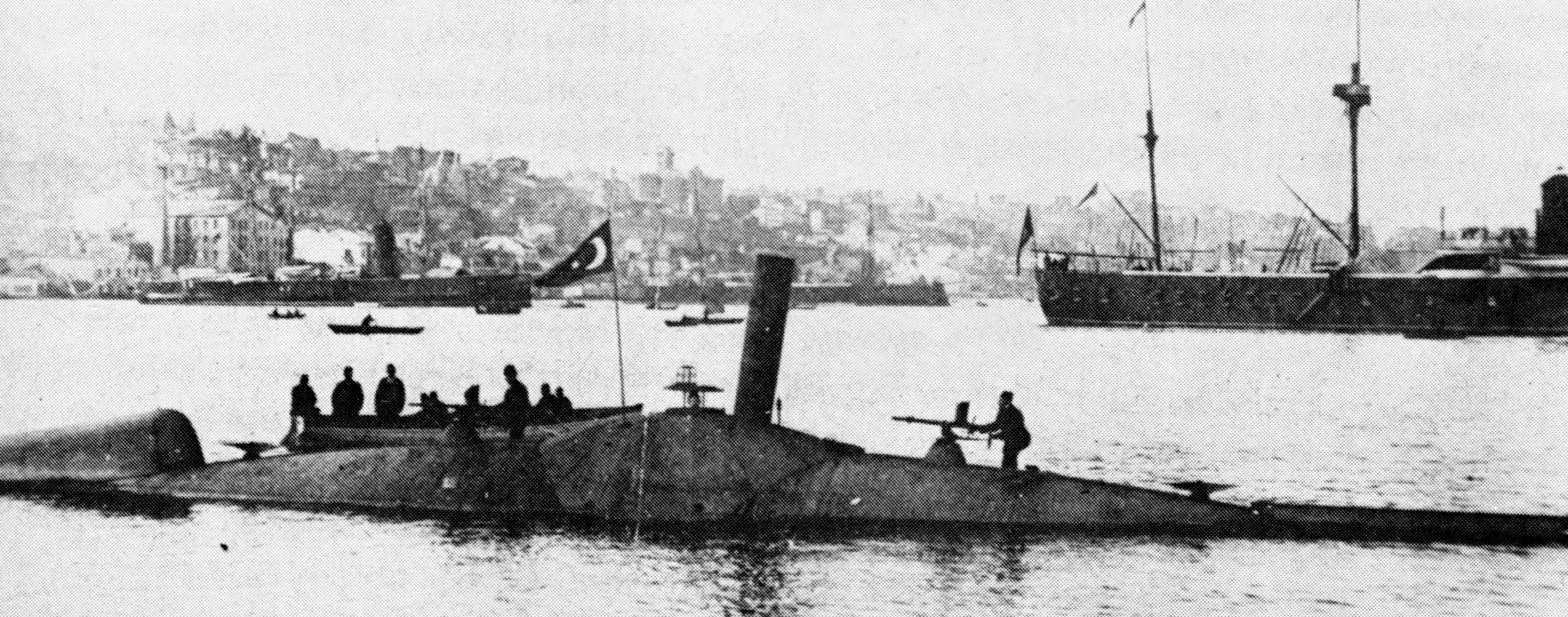
- The Nordenfelt-class Ottoman submarine Abdül Hamid (1886) was the first submarine in history to fire a torpedo while submerged.

History

Ottoman Empire
- Name: Abdül Hamid
- Namesake: Sultan Abdul Hamid II
- Launched: 6 September 1886
- In service: 24 March 1888
- Out of service: 1910
- Fate: Scrapped 1910

General characteristics
- Class & type: Nordenfelt
- Displacement: 100 tons
- Length: 30.5 m (100 ft)
- Beam: 6 m (20 ft)
- Propulsion: Coal-fired 250 hp Lamm steam engine
- Speed: 6 kn (11 km/h) surfaced; 4 kn (7.4 km/h)
- Test depth: 160 ft (49 m)
- Armament: Two 356 mm torpedo tubes; Two 35 mm machine guns

The submarine Abdül Hamid (also Abdülhamid) was an early steam powered submarine built in the United Kingdom in 1880 at the Barrow Shipyard. It was bought and put in service by the Ottoman Navy and named after Sultan Abdül Hamid II. It was the first submarine in the world to fire a live torpedo underwater.

== History ==
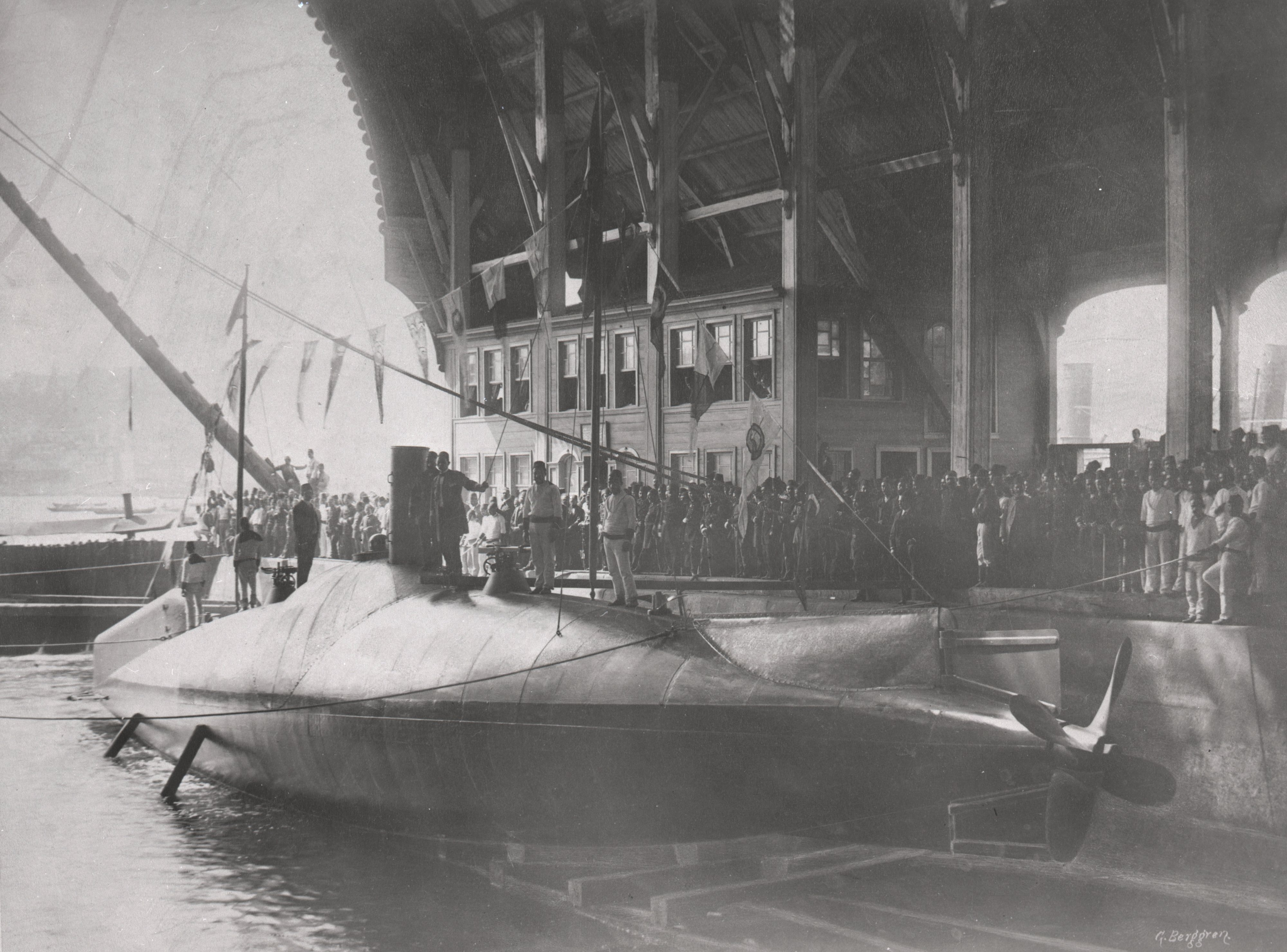
Ottoman submarine Abdül Hamid at the Taşkızak Naval Shipyard in Istanbul, 1886.

The Ottoman Empire carried out various military modernizations as a result of emergence of new technologies in the 19th century. Sultan Abdul Hamid II instructed the Minister of the Navy (Bahriye Nazırı), Bozcaadalı Hasan Hüsnü Paşa, to acquire these new boats for the navy. The Greek interest in buying submarines was also a factor that prompted Sultan Abdul Hamid II to purchase these boats to establish a more powerful navy to protect the Ottoman Aegean assets.

Barrow Shipyard built two steam-engine powered boats, designed by Swedish industrialist and arms dealer Thorsten Nordenfelt. These were ultimately sold to the Ottoman Empire and Russia. The submarine for Russia never reached her customer, foundering on the Jutland (Danish) coast on her delivery voyage.

Abdül Hamid was dismantled for delivery by ship and re-assembled at the Taşkızak Naval Shipyard (Turkish: Taşkızak Tersanesi) along the Golden Horn in Istanbul under the supervision of its English designer, George William Garrett. Another boat of Nordenfelt class, Abdül Mecid, was built at the same time and later delivered to the Ottoman Navy.

Abdül Hamid was first launched on September 6, 1886, in front of many international dignitaries lined along the Golden Horn. Initial diving tests were carried out on 5 February 1887. Three dives were attempted successfully, 20 seconds each, with only the hemispherical navigator cockpit remaining above the water. On another test run in early 1888, the submarine was able to navigate through the strong currents around the Seraglio Point, making up to 10 knots of speed, and successfully sank an old target ship with a single torpedo. After more tests and trial at Izmit naval base, they officially joined the Ottoman Navy in a flag ceremony on 24 March 1888.

== Technical details ==
Abdül Hamid was powered by a coal-fired 250 hp Lamm steam engine turning a single screw. It carried two 356mm torpedo tubes and two 25mm Nordenfelt guns.

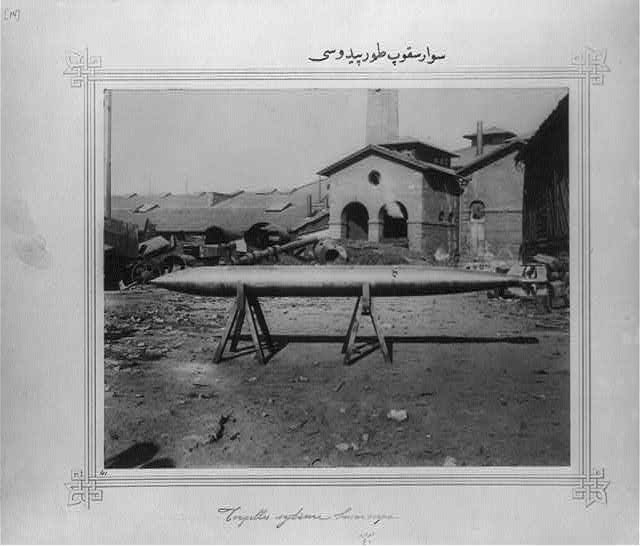
One of the torpedoes used by Ottoman submarines Abdül Hamid and Abdül Mecid.

It could carry a total of 8 tons of coal as fuel and could dive to a depth of 160 feet. It was 30.5m long and 6m wide, and weighed 100 tons. It had a normal crew of 7. It had a maximum surface speed of 6 knots, and a maximum speed of 4 knots while submerged.

In preparation for the dive, the crew had to close the boiler and pull down the funnel. Air tanks that were pressurized while sailing on the surface were used to propel the boats a short distance under water, allowing them to remain submerged for only a few minutes. They had multiple torpedo tubes, at first, all on the deck.

The boats turned out to not be battle-worthy, as their speed and (submerged) range were limited at best, and they were poorly balanced, which was made even worse when firing off a torpedo.

The Abdül Hamid and Abdül Mecid were reported to be unserviceable by 1909. In 1914 the submarines were briefly considered for use in harbour defence by the German Military Mission, but it was found that their hulls were too badly corroded.
