= Nordenfelt v Maxim Nordenfelt Guns and Ammunition Co Ltd =

English court case of the 19th century

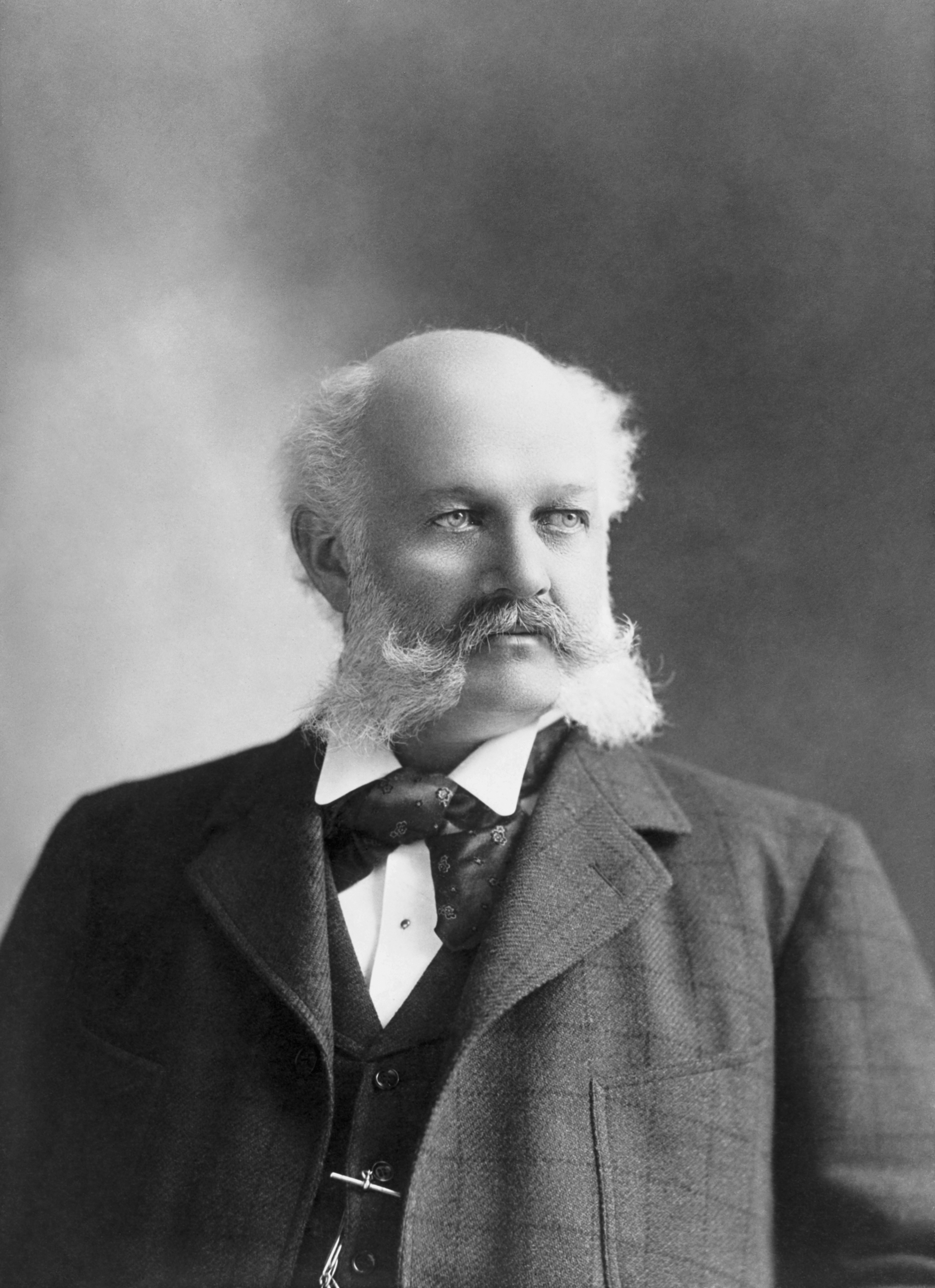
- Thorsten Nordenfelt in 1894
- Court: House of Lords
- Citation: [1894] AC 535
- Transcript: judgment

Court membership
- Judges sitting: Lord Macnaghten, Lord Watson Lord Herschell, Lord Ashbourne Lord Morris

Keywords
- Restraint of trade, competition law, illegality

Nordenfelt v Maxim Nordenfelt Guns and Ammunition Co Ltd [1894] AC 535 is a 19th-century English case decided by the House of Lords. The dispute was about restraint of trade, and the judgment declares when such a restraint (which is prima facie void) may become valid.

The case also established the "blue pencil doctrine" as a method for deciding whether contractual obligations can be partially enforced when the obligation as drafted in the contract has an element of illegality.

== Facts ==
Thorsten Nordenfelt, a manufacturer specialising in armaments, had sold his business to Hiram Stevens Maxim. They had agreed that Nordenfelt ‘would not make guns or ammunition anywhere in the world, and would not compete with Maxim in any way for a period of 25 years’.

== Judgment ==
The House of Lords held that the restraint was reasonable in the interests of the parties. They placed emphasis on the £200,000 that Thomas Nordenfeldt had received as full value for his sale.

== Significance ==
Following Nordenfelt, restraint of trade clauses were prima facie void at common law, but they may be deemed valid if three conditions are met:

- the terms seek to protect a legitimate interest
- the terms are reasonable in scope from the viewpoint of the parties involved
- the terms are reasonable in scope from the viewpoint of public policy.

The question on severability was whether the reasonable restriction could be enforced when it was in the same contract as an unreasonable and unenforceable restriction. The court used the test of whether striking out (with a blue pencil) words containing unreasonable provisions would leave behind a contractual obligation that still made sense. If it did, then the amended contract would be enforced by the court. An unreasonable restraint is severable, and the court enforced the amended agreement that Nordenfelt "for the next 25 years, would not make guns or ammunition anywhere in the world ~~, and would not compete with Maxim in any way~~" thus permitting him to trade in those very items in direct competition with Maxim, illustrating the limited practical utility of the rule under its strike-out only stricture.

== See also ==
- Restraint of trade
- English contract law
