= Thorsten Nordenfelt =

Swedish inventor and industrialist (1842–1920)

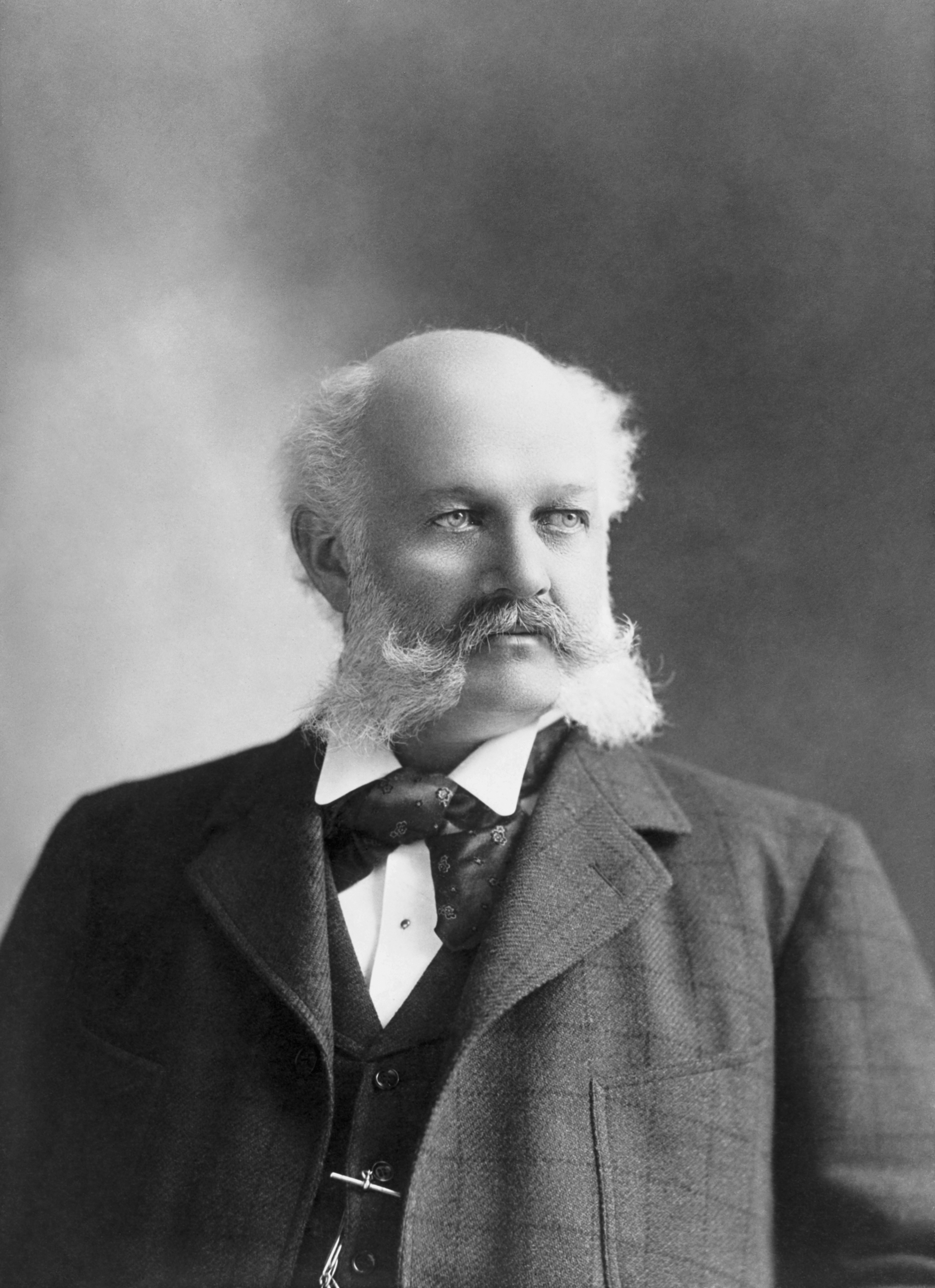
- Nordenfelt in 1894
- Born: Thorsten Nordenfelt; 1 March 1842; Örby, Sweden,
- Died: 8 February 1920 (aged 77); Stockholm, Sweden
- Occupation: Inventor
- Spouse: Emma Stansfeld Grundy

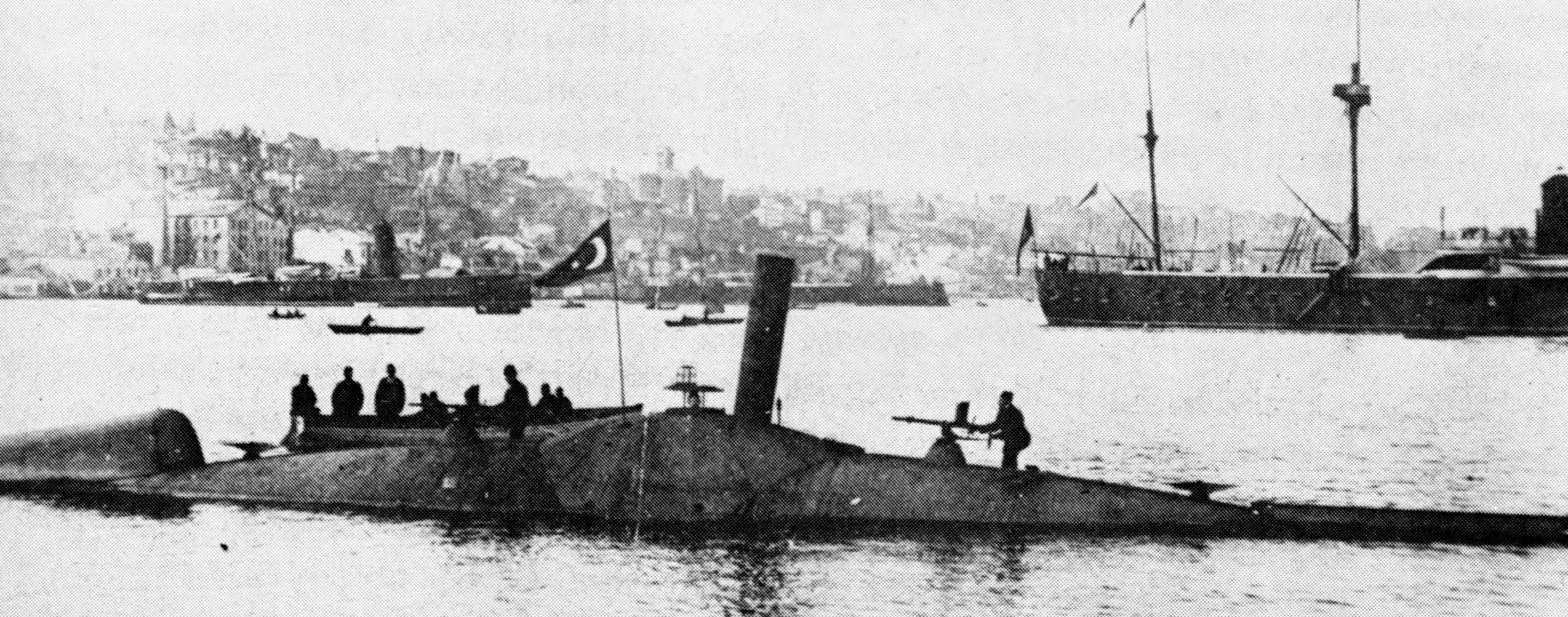
Nordenfelt class Ottoman submarine Abdülhamid (1886) was the first submarine in history to fire a torpedo while submerged. Two submarines of this class, Nordenfelt II (Abdülhamid, 1886) and Nordenfelt III (Abdülmecid, 1887) joined the Ottoman fleet. They were built in pieces by Des Vignes (Chertsey) and Vickers (Sheffield) in England, and assembled at the Taşkızak Naval Shipyard in Istanbul, Turkey.

Thorsten Nordenfelt (1 March 1842 – 8 February 1920) was a Swedish inventor and industrialist.

== Career ==
Nordenfelt was born in Örby outside Kinna, Sweden, the son of a colonel. The surname was and is often spelled Nordenfeldt, though Thorsten and his brothers always spelled it Nordenfelt, and the 1881 Census shows it as Nordenfelt. The family home in that year was Leinster Lodge on the Uxbridge Road, Paddington in west London.

Thorsten worked for a Swedish company in London from 1862 to 1866 and migrated to England in 1867 when he married Emma Stansfeld Grundy.

Thorsten Nordenfelt and his brother-in-law started a small business to trade Swedish steel for British rails in 1867. Later on he founded Nordenfelt Guns and Ammunition Company, ltd to develop a machine-gun designed by Helge Palmcrantz that would be referred to as the Nordenfelt gun. His company also designed a range of anti-torpedoboat guns in calibres from 37 to 57 mm, that were produced in Erith, Kent, Stockholm and Spain. Under pressure from Rothschild and Vickers his company merged with Maxim's in 1888 to form The Maxim Nordenfelt Guns and Ammunition Company.

After a personal bankruptcy Nordenfelt was forced out of the Nordenfelt-Maxim company in 1890 and left England for France, where his new company, Société Nordenfelt, designed the eccentric screw breech used on the French 75. Legal action followed (Nordenfelt v Maxim, Nordenfelt Guns and Ammunition Co Ltd) over a non-compete clause Nordenfelt had signed.

In 1903 he returned to Sweden and retired.

In 1902 a public house named after Thorsten Nordenfelt was built at 181 Erith Road, Erith just along from the Gun and Carriage works of Vickers, Sons and Maxim (previously Maxim Nordenfelt Guns and Ammunition Company) . Named 'The Nordenfelt Tavern' it was built to the design of Jonathan G. Ensor (1852/3-19??), architect for brewer Watney Combe & Reid.

== Submarines ==
Discussions between Thorsten Nordenfelt and the English reverend George Garrett led to the production of a series of steam-powered submarines. The first was the Nordenfelt I, a 56-tonne, 19.5-metre long vessel similar to Garret's ill-fated Resurgam (1879), with a range of 240 kilometres and armed with a single torpedo and a 25.4 mm machine gun. It was manufactured by Bolinders in Stockholm in 1884–1885. Like the Resurgam, it operated on the surface using a 100 HP steam engine with a maximum speed of 9 kn, then it shut down its engine to dive. She was purchased by the Greek Government and was delivered in parts, assembled in Piraeus by the IFAISTOS machine works in 1886. Following the acceptance tests, she was never used again by the Hellenic Navy and was scrapped in 1901.

Nordenfelt then built the Nordenfelt II (Abdül Hamid) in 1886 and Nordenfelt III (Abdül Mecid) in 1887, a pair of 30-metre long submarines with twin torpedo tubes, for the Ottoman Navy. Abdül Hamid became the first submarine in history to fire a torpedo while submerged. Nordenfelt's efforts culminated in 1887 with the Nordenfelt IV which had twin motors and twin torpedoes. It was sold to the Russians, but proved unstable and ran aground off Jutland; it was scrapped when the Russians refused to pay for it.

Abdülhamid and Abdülmecid were in Istanbul in 1914. The submarines were briefly considered for use in harbour defence but it was found that their hulls were too badly corroded.

== Honors and awards ==
- Commander of the Order of Legion of Honour
- Commander of the Order of Leopold (Belgium)
- Knight of the Order of the Dannebrog
- Commander of the Order of Isabella the Catholic
- Commander of the Military Order of Christ

== Bibliography ==
- Ahlberg, Lars; Caruana, J. (1991). "Question 1/90". Warship International. XXVIII (2): 190–192. ISSN 0043-0374.
