= Cassier's Magazine =

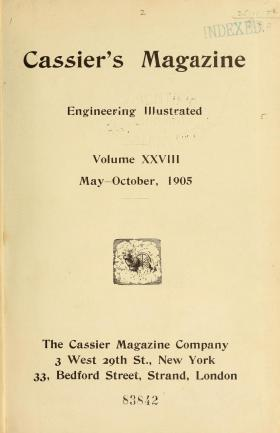
- Editor: Louis Cassier (1891–1906); Henry H. Suplee (1906–1913)
- Categories: Engineering magazine
- Frequency: Monthly
- Founder: Louis Cassier
- First issue: 1891
- Final issue: 1913
- Company: The Cassier Magazine Company
- Country: United States
- Based in: New York City
- Language: English
- OCLC: 70737976

Cassier's Magazine: An Engineering Monthly was an engineering magazine, published by the Cassier Magazine Company from 1891 to 1913.

== History ==
The magazine was established by Louis Cassier (1862–1906) in 1891. He was the editor until his death in the 1906 Salisbury rail crash in Great Britain. Henry Harrison Suplee (1856 – after 1943) then took over as the publisher. The headquarters was in New York City.

A London edition was launched in the autumn of 1894.

Miss Julia McIntyre, who was said to have been the first woman to qualify as an engineer in England, in 1904, was a writer for the magazine.

The magazine ceased publication in 1913.
