= Hiram Maxim =

American and British inventor (1840–1916)

Sir Hiram Maxim
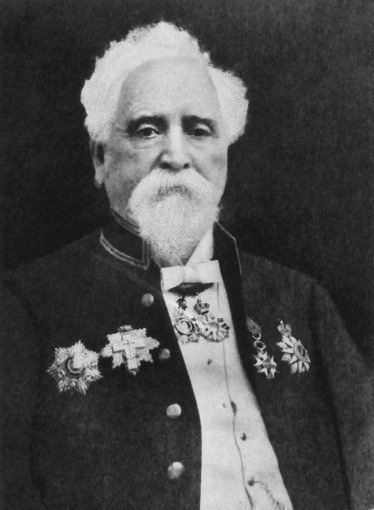
- Maxim c. 1916
- Born: Hiram Stevens Maxim; 5 February 1840; Sangerville, Maine, U.S.
- Died: 24 November 1916 (aged 76); Streatham, London, England
- Resting place: West Norwood Cemetery; 51.43354°N 0.10314°W
- Occupation: Inventor
- Known for: Maxim gun
- Spouses: Jane Budden (m. 1867) Sarah Haynes (m. 1881)
- Children: 3, including Hiram Percy Maxim
- Relatives: Hudson Maxim (brother)

Sir Hiram Stevens Maxim (5 February 1840 – 24 November 1916) was an American-born British inventor best known as the creator of the first automatic machine gun, the Maxim gun. Maxim held patents on numerous mechanical devices such as hair-curling irons, a mousetrap, and steam pumps. Maxim laid claim to inventing the lightbulb.

Maxim experimented with powered flight; his large aircraft designs were never successful. Circa 1904 he designed a highly successful amusement ride called the "Captive Flying Machine" to fund his research while generating public interest in flight.

Maxim moved from the United States to the United Kingdom at the age of 41, and remained an American citizen until he became a naturalised British citizen in 1899, and received a knighthood in 1901.

== Birth and early life ==
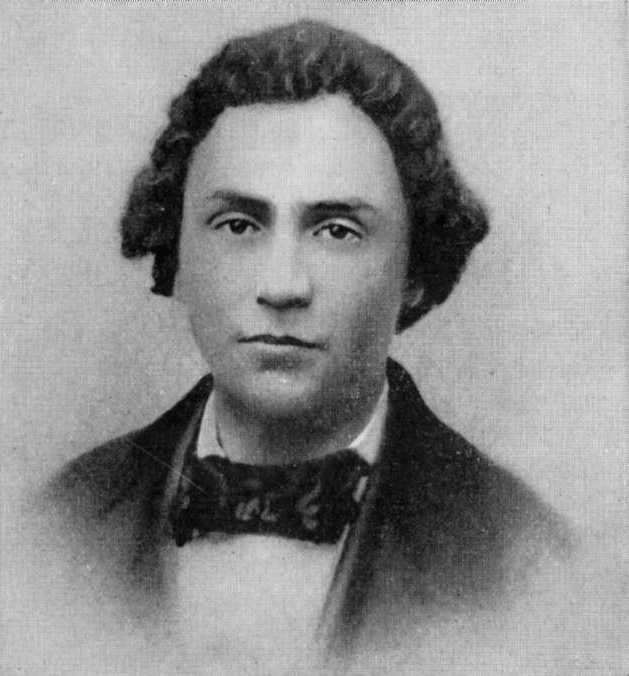
Hiram Maxim at the age of 17, c. 1857

Hiram Stevens Maxim was born in Sangerville, Maine, on 5 February 1840, into a family of French Huguenot origin. He became an apprentice coachbuilder at the age of 14 and ten years later, took up a job at the machine works of his uncle, Levi Stephens, at Fitchburg, Massachusetts. He subsequently worked as an instrument-maker and as a draughtsman. His early jobs in these areas led him to be often disappointed with workers when he ran his own companies later on in life. Hiram called himself a Protestant.

== Inventions ==
Maxim, a longtime sufferer of bronchitis, patented and manufactured a pocket menthol inhaler and a larger "Pipe of Peace", a steam inhaler using pine vapour, that he claimed could relieve asthma, tinnitus, hay fever and catarrh. After being criticised for applying his talents to quackery, he protested that "it will be seen that it is a very creditable thing to invent a killing machine, and nothing less than a disgrace to invent an apparatus to prevent human suffering".

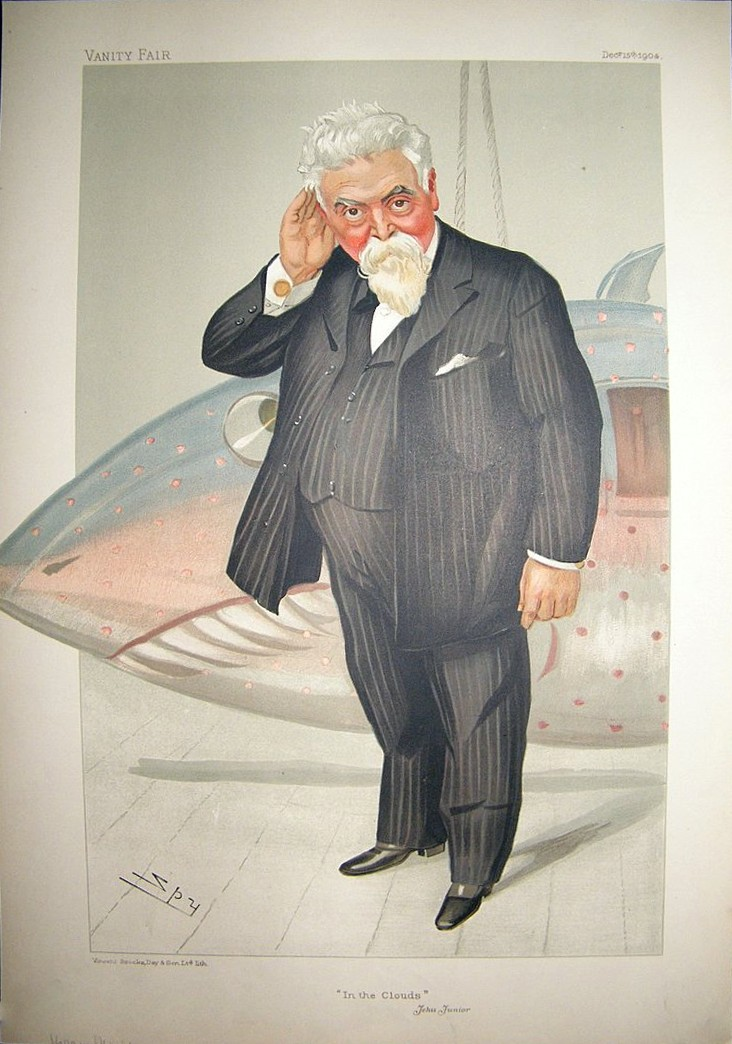
Maxim caricatured by Spy for Vanity Fair, 1904

He also invented a curling iron, an apparatus for demagnetising watches, magno-electric machines, devices to prevent the rolling of ships, eyelet and riveting machines, aircraft artillery, an aerial torpedo gun, coffee substitutes, and various oil, steam, and gas engines.

A large furniture factory had repeatedly burned down, and Maxim was consulted on how to prevent a recurrence. As a result, Maxim invented the first automatic fire sprinkler. It would douse the areas that were on fire, and it would report the fire to the fire station. Maxim was unable to sell the idea elsewhere, but when the patent expired the idea was used.

Maxim developed and installed the first electric lights in a New York City building (the Equitable Life Building at 120 Broadway) in Manhattan in the late 1870s. In 1878 he cofounded the United States Electric Lighting Company together with Edward Weston to commercialize his designs.

However, he was involved in several lengthy patent disputes with Thomas Edison over his claims to the lightbulb. One of these actions regarded the incandescent bulb, for which Maxim claimed that Edison was credited by means of his better understanding of patenting law. Maxim claimed that an employee of his had falsely patented the invention under his own name, and that Edison proved the employee's claim to be false, knowing that patent law would mean the invention would become public property, allowing Edison to manufacture the lightbulb without crediting Maxim as the true inventor.

=== Maxim gun ===
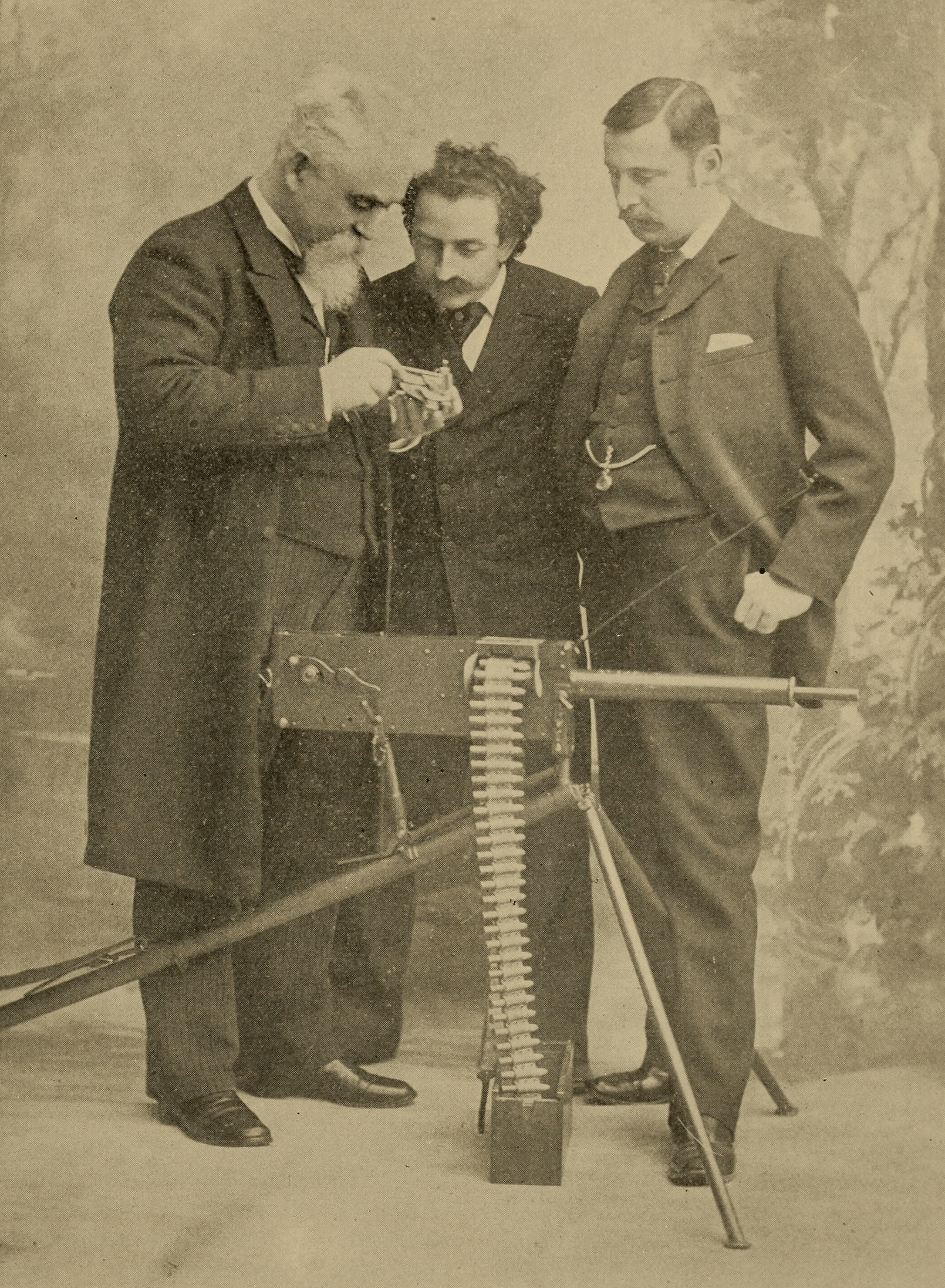
Image from the April 1895 edition Cassier's Magazine, showing Hiram Maxim and the Maxim gun, along with Louis Cassier and J. Bucknall Smith

Maxim was reported to have said: "In 1882 I was in Vienna, where I met an American whom I had known in the States. He said: 'Hang your chemistry and electricity! If you want to make a pile of money, invent something that will enable these Europeans to cut each others' throats with greater facility.'"

As a child, Maxim had been knocked over by a rifle's recoil, and this inspired him to use that recoil force to automatically operate a gun. Between 1883 and 1885 Maxim patented gas, recoil and blowback methods of operation. After moving to England, he settled in a large house formerly owned by Lord Thurlow in West Norwood where he developed his design for an automatic weapon, using an action that would close the breech and compress a spring, by storing the recoil energy released by a shot to prepare the gun for its next shot. He thoughtfully ran announcements in the local press warning that he would be experimenting with the gun in his garden and that neighbours should keep their windows open to avoid the danger of broken glass.

Maxim founded an arms company with financial backing from Edward Vickers to produce his machine gun in Crayford, Kent, which later merged with Nordenfelt. Subsequently, part of the Barrow Shipbuilding Company purchase by Vickers Corporation in 1897, formed 'Vickers, Son & Maxim'. Their improved development of the Maxim gun design, the Vickers machine gun, after Maxim's resignation from the board in 1911 on his 71st birthday, was the standard British machine gun for many years. With arms sales led by Basil Zaharoff, variants of the Maxim gun were bought and used extensively by both sides during World War I.

In his later years Maxim became profoundly deaf, as his hearing had been damaged by years of exposure to the noise of his guns.

=== Flying machines ===
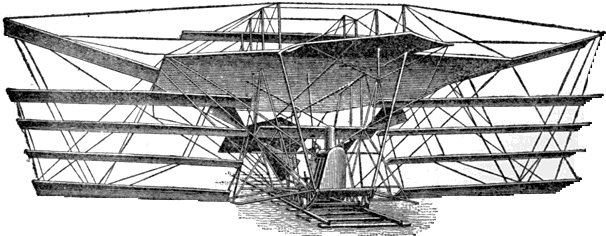
Maxim's flying machine

Maxim's father had earlier conceived of a helicopter powered by two counter-rotating rotors, but was unable to find a powerful enough engine to build it. Hiram first sketched out plans for a helicopter in 1872, but when he built his first "flying machine" he chose to use wings. Before starting design work, he carried out a series of experiments on aerofoil sections and propeller design, at first using a wind tunnel and later building a whirling arm test rig. Construction started in 1889 of a 40-foot-long (12 m) craft with a 110-foot (34 m) wingspan that weighed 3.5 tons, powered by two lightweight naptha-fired 360-horsepower (268 kW) steam engines driving two 17-foot-diameter (5.2 m) laminated pine propellers.

Conceived of as a test rig, the machine ran on an 1,800-foot (550 m) length of rail track which Maxim laid down for the purpose at his home, Baldwyn's Park Mansion, Baldwyn's Park in Bexley. The initial intention was to prevent the machine from lifting off by using heavy cast-iron wheels, but after initial trials, Maxim concluded that this would not suffice, and so the machine was fitted with four wheeled outriggers which were restrained by wooden rails 13 feet (4.0 m) outside the central track. In trials in 1894, the machine lifted and was prevented from rising by the outriggers. During its test run, all the outriggers were engaged, showing that it had developed enough lift to take off, but in so doing, it pulled up the track; the tethered "flight" was aborted in time to prevent disaster. Maxim subsequently abandoned work on it but put his experience to work on fairground rides. He subsequently noted that a feasible flying machine would need better power-to-weight engines, such as a petrol combustion engine.

==== Captive Flying Machines ====
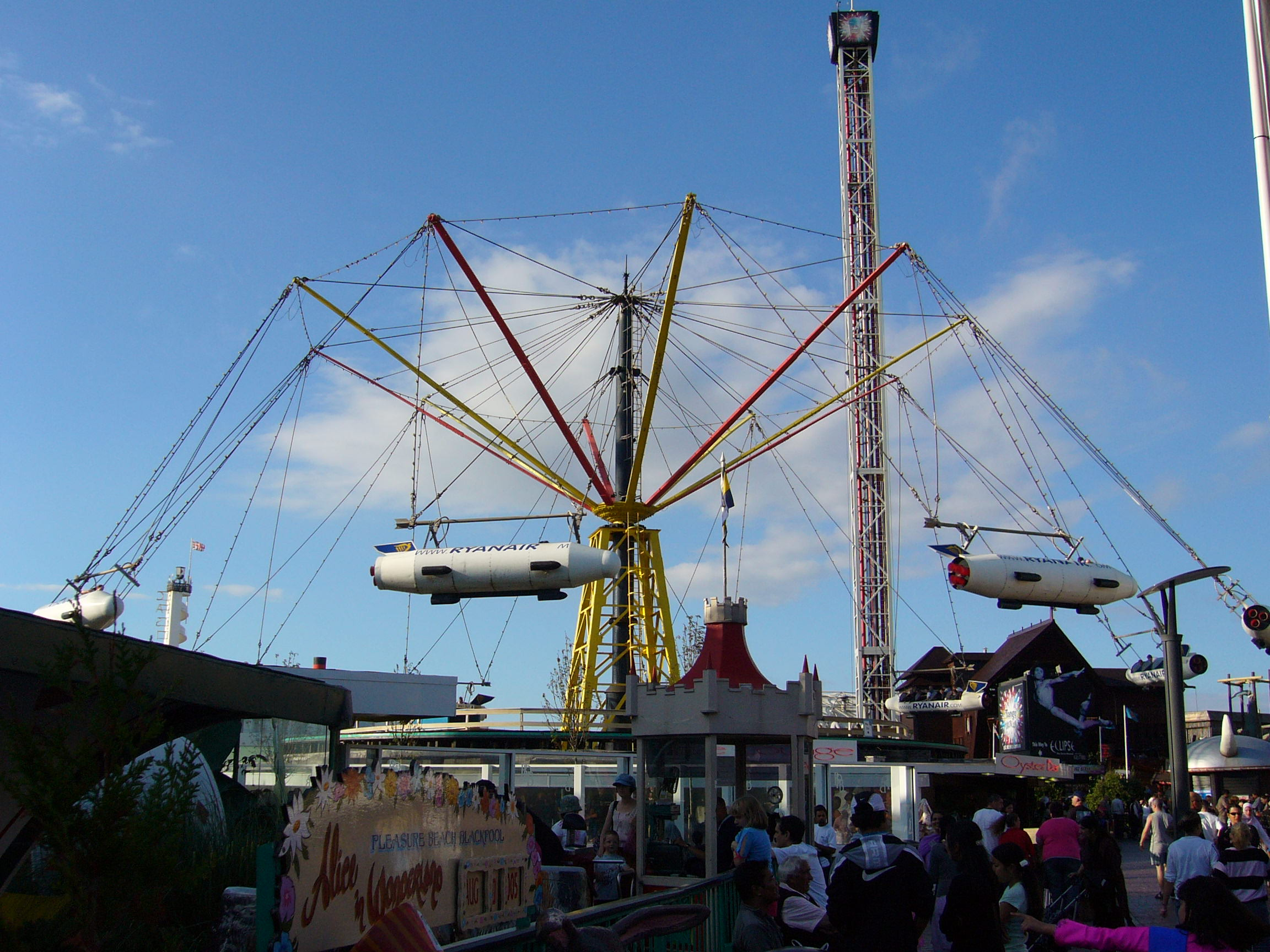
The Sir Hiram Maxim Captive Flying Machines operating at Blackpool Pleasure Beach in 2006

To both fund his research into flight and to bring attention to the notion of flight, Maxim designed and built an amusement ride for the Earl's Court exhibition of 1904. The ride was based on a test-rig he had devised for his research, and consisted of a large spinning frame from which cars hung captive. As the machine spun, the cars would be swung outward through the air, simulating flight. The ride was similar to the later Circle Swing ride, made popular in the US by renowned roller-coaster designer Harry Traver.

Maxim originally intended to use primitive aerofoils and wings to allow riders to control their flight, but this was outlawed as unsafe. As a result, Maxim quickly lost interest in the project, declaring the adapted ride as "Simply a glorified merry-go-round". Nevertheless, his company built several more rides of various sizes at The Crystal Palace and various seaside resorts including Southport, New Brighton, and Blackpool, all of which opened in 1904. Originally, Maxim had intended to build only two, but a lengthy breakdown on the original Earl's Court ride forced him to build more to make the venture profitable. He had plans for further variations of the ride but his disillusionment with the amusement business meant that they were never realised.

Although he expressed regrets about the whole project, the rides were held in high regard within the amusement industry and the Blackpool ride still operates to this day as part of what is now the Pleasure Beach amusement park. Along with the same park's similarly historic river caves, it is the oldest operating amusement ride in Europe. The Flying Machines has the distinction of being virtually unchanged from Maxim's original design. The Blackpool ride's name is now usually abbreviated to the "Flying Machine" or "Flying Machines", although the full name, "Sir Hiram Maxim's Captive Flying Machines", is given at the ride entrance.

In 2001, Disney California Adventure Park opened, featuring the Golden Zephyr, a modern-day recreation of the Traver version of the ride. The ride itself is much smaller than the Blackpool version, with cars swinging out at a much smaller angle. Nevertheless, engineers from Disney visited Blackpool to inspect the Maxim ride (the only example of either version still standing) to help design their ride.

== Grahame-White, Blériot, and Maxim Company ==
In 1911, Maxim headed the newly formed Grahame-White, Blériot, and Maxim Company, founded with the two aviators and two hundred thousand pounds of capital. He had hoped to produce military aircraft capable of scouting or dropping a 500-pound (230 kg) bomb, but his failing health and financial difficulties with his other enterprises restricted his ability to develop this enterprise before his death.

== Philosophy ==
In addition to his engineering endeavors, Maxim, a lifelong atheist "compiled and edited" a book he called Li Hung Chang's Scrapbook. This book was addressed to Li Hung Chang (also spelled Li Hongzhang and Li Hung-chang) and endeavored to address a belief that "The Chinese were generally puzzled as to how it was possible for people who are able to build locomotives and steamships to have a religion based on a belief in devils, ghosts, impossible miracles, and all the other absurdities and impossibilities peculiar to the religion taught by the missionaries."

Maxim held European missionaries in China in low esteem, for reasons described in the scrapbook. He stated "...it was my aim, in compiling for His Excellency a scrap-book with explanatory notes, to put the Chinaman right in this respect. I wished to show that we were not all fools." His scrapbook comprised some 400 pages with 42 illustrations, presenting his views on The Nature of Christianity; Christianity in China; and his conclusions on subjects including Miracles, Spirituality, Faith; and the influence of the Bible on the civilization of Europe and America. He concluded his scrapbook with an appeal to the Missionaries and his thoughts on the reason for the failure of what he described as "Missionary Propaganda" in China.

== Honours ==
Maxim was a Chevalier of the Legion of Honour; a Civil, Mechanical and Electrical Engineer; Member of the London Chamber of Commerce; Fellow of the Royal Institution; Member of the British Association for the Advancement of Science; Member of the British Empire League; and Fellow of the Royal Society of Arts.

== Emigration and knighthood ==
In 1881, Maxim arrived in Britain to reorganise the London offices of the United States Electric Lighting Company. His visits back to the United States became increasingly infrequent and, on 16 September 1899, Maxim became a naturalised British citizen. In the following year, Queen Victoria bestowed a knighthood on him. However Victoria died on 22 January 1901, shortly before Maxim's investiture, and so the honour was conferred by Maxim's "friend and new king, Edward VII" at Marlborough House on 9 February 1901.

== Death ==
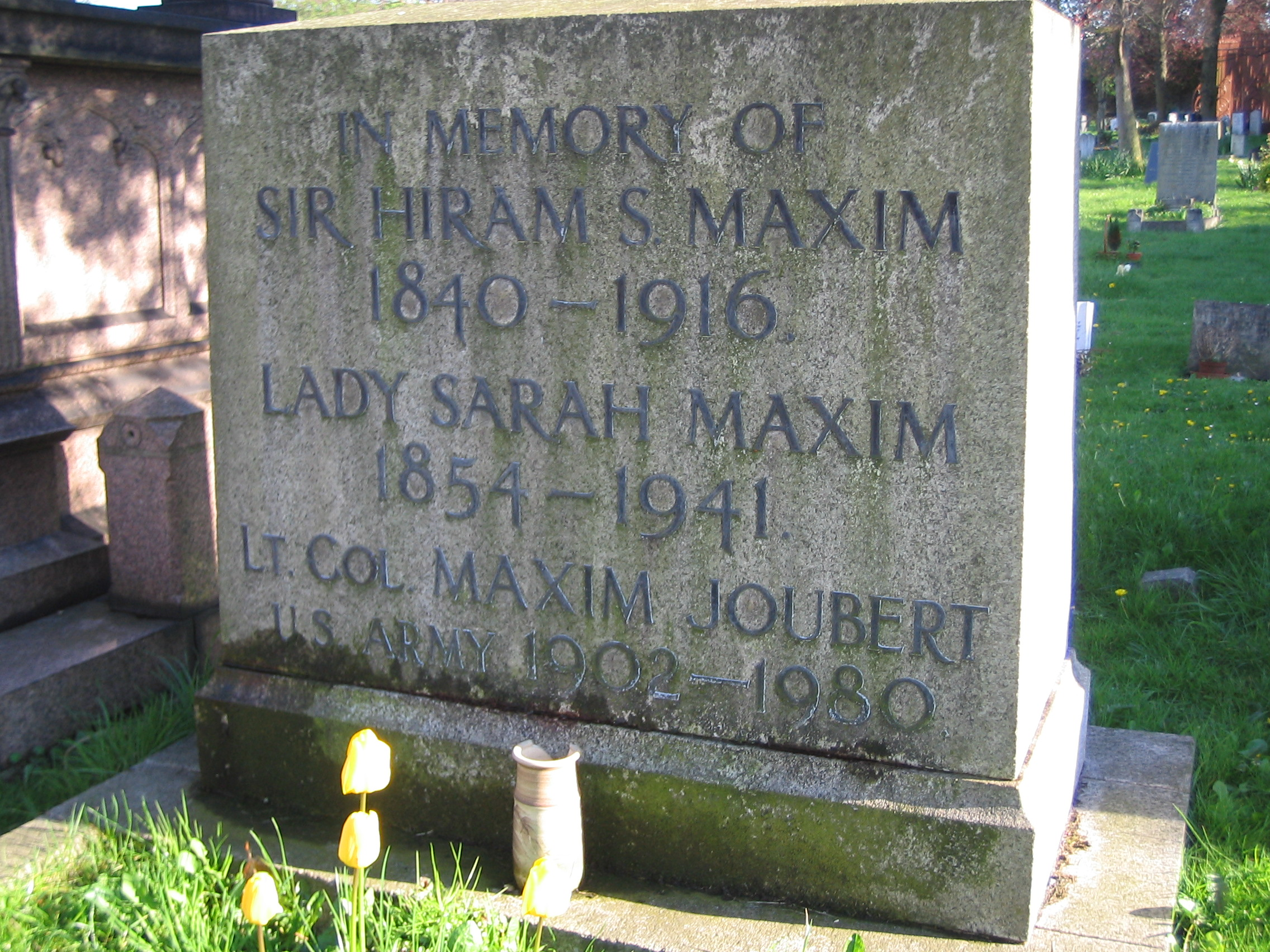
Gravestone of Sir Hiram Maxim

Maxim died at his home in Streatham, London on 24 November 1916 at the age of 76. He is buried in south London's West Norwood Cemetery with his wife and his grandson, Lieutenant Colonel Maxim Joubert.

== Family ==
His brother, Hudson Maxim, was also a military inventor, specializing in explosives. They worked quite closely together until later in life, when there was a disagreement on a patent for smokeless powder. The patent, Hiram claimed, had been issued under the name 'H. Maxim,' and that because of this, his brother was able to stake a claim as the powder being his own. Hudson was a skilled and knowledgeable man, and sold arms in the US, while Hiram worked mainly in Europe. Hudson had success in the States, which caused jealousy from Hiram (he lamented having a "double" of himself running around in the States). The jealousy and disagreements caused a rift between the brothers that would last the rest of their lives.

Hiram Maxim married his first wife, the English-born Jane Budden, on 11 May 1867 in Boston, Massachusetts. Their children were: Hiram Percy Maxim; Florence Maxim, who married George Albert Cutter, and Adelaide Maxim, who married Eldon Joubert, Ignacy Jan Paderewski's piano tuner. In 1875, the family moved to Fanwood, New Jersey, with Hiram joining the family on weekends.

His son Hiram Percy Maxim followed in his father's and uncle's footsteps and became a mechanical engineer and weapons designer as well, but he is perhaps best known for his early amateur radio experiments and for founding the American Radio Relay League. His invention of the "Maxim Silencer" for noise suppression came too late to save his father's hearing. Hiram Percy later wrote a biography of his father titled A Genius in the Family, containing about 60 anecdotes of Hiram Percy's experiences with his father throughout his early life (until about age 12). Most of these short stories are entertaining; they give a reader an insider's (and a child's) view of the man's personal and family life. So Goes My Love, a film loosely based on these memoirs and starring Don Ameche and Myrna Loy, was released in 1946.

Hiram Maxim married his secretary and mistress, Sarah, daughter of Charles Haynes of Boston, in 1881. It is not clear if he was legally divorced from his first wife at this time. The marriage was registered again in Westminster, London in 1890.

A woman called Helen Leighton brought a case against Maxim, claiming that he had married her in 1878 and that "he was knowingly committing bigamy" against his current wife, Jane Budden. She claimed further that Maxim had fathered a child named Romaine by her. The case was eventually dropped, being settled for under $1,000 (the original amount asked for was $25,000), and Maxim put behind him the near public humiliation the case caused. In October 1898, Helen Leighton again brought charges against Maxim for bigamy and abandonment in Poughkeepsie, New York. Later in life, he left 4,000 pounds sterling to a Romaine Dennison, perhaps the child Leighton claimed he had fathered.

== Books ==
- Artificial and Natural Flight. Whittaker. 1908.
- Artificial and Natural Flight (2nd ed. with supplement ed.). Whittaker. 1909.
- Li Hung Chang's Scrapbook
- A New System of Preventing Collisions at Sea. Schwarz Press. 2009. ISBN 978-1-4446-0553-2. Archived from the original on 24 July 2012.
- My Life. Methuen & Co., Ltd. 1915. ISBN 9781408609675.
- Monte Carlo facts and fallacies. Grant Richards. 1904.

== Patents ==
- U.S. patent 208,252 – Electric lamp
- U.S. patent 230,310 – Electric lamp
- U.S. patent 230,953 – Electric lamps
- U.S. patent 230,954 – Process for removing air from globes of electric lamps
- U.S. patent 230,309 – Electric lamp
- U.S. patent 234,835 – Electrical lamp
- U.S. patent 237,198 – Process of manufacturing carbon conductors
- U.S. patent 244,277 – Electric Lamp
- U.S. patent 247,083 – Process of Manufacturing Carbons
- U.S. patent 247,084 – Incandescent Electric Lamp
- U.S. patent 247,085 – Process of Manufacturing Carbon Conductors
- U.S. patent 247,380 – Electric Lamp
- U.S. patent 255,308 – Electrical meter
- U.S. patent 277,846 – Process of Manufacturing Carbons for Incandescent Lamps
- U.S. patent 283,629 – Electric Lamp
- U.S. patent 321,513 – Machine Gun
- U.S. patent 405,239 – Apparatus for the Manufacture of Filaments for Incandescent Lamps
- U.S. patent 405,170 – Manufacture of Filaments for Electric Lamps
- U.S. patent 430,212 – Manufacture of explosive
- U.S. patent 618,703 – Apparatus for Manufacturing Filaments for Electric Lamps
- U.S. patent 618,704 – Method of Manufacturing Filaments for Electric Lamps
- GB 189700207, Maxim, Hiram Stevens & Silverman, Louis, "Improvements in the Firing Mechanism of Automatic Guns", issued 30 October 1897
- GB 189607468, Maxim, Hiram Stevens, "Improvements in Automatic Guns", issued 27 February 1897, gas action for machine guns
- GB 189607045, Maxim, Hiram Stevens, "Improvements in Automatic Machine Guns", issued 13 March 1897, breech mechanism of machine gun

== See also ==
- William Cantelo, an early machine gun inventor who disappeared in the 1880s but whose family believed he had reemerged as Hiram Maxim.
