= George Garrett (inventor) =

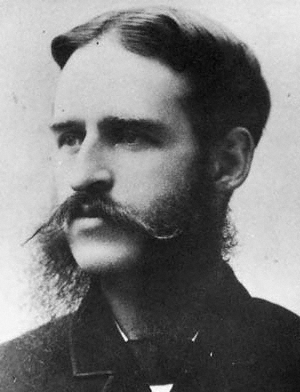
George Garrett

George William Littler Garrett (4 July 1852 – 26 February 1902) was a British clergyman and inventor who pioneered submarine design.

== Early life ==
He was brought up in Moss Side in Manchester, Lancashire, England, the son of an Irish-born Church of England curate. He attended Rossall School near Fleetwood and then Manchester Grammar School, then studied Chemistry and General Science at Owens College (also in Manchester) before attending Trinity College, Dublin. He was appointed assistant master at the Manchester Mechanics' Institute and subsequently obtained a BA degree.

In 1873, he passed the Cambridge Theological Examination and became a curate in his father's parish.

== Inventions ==
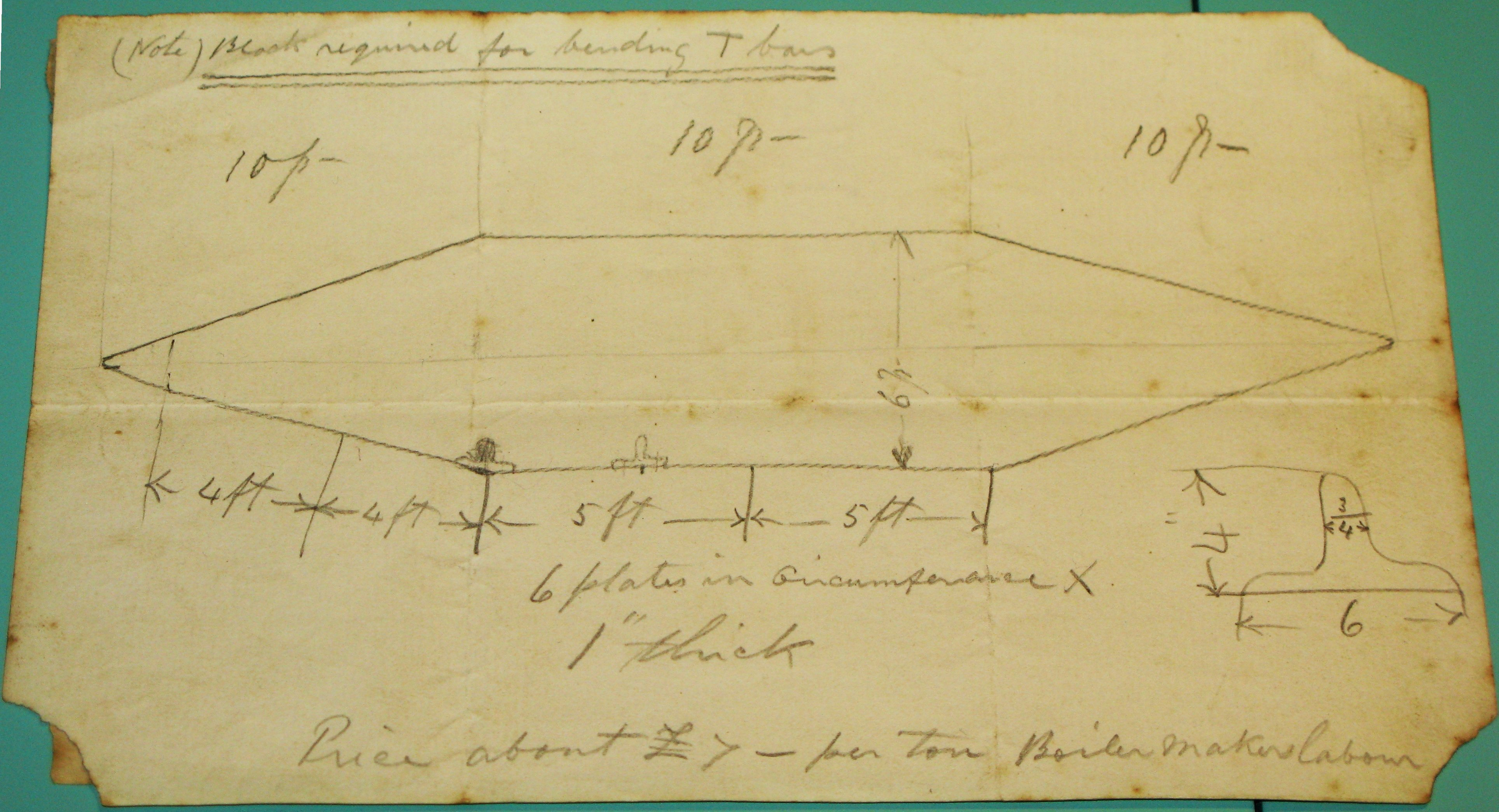
Sketch of the design of Resurgam II by George Garrett

He invented a diving suit in 1877, demonstrating it to the French government in the River Seine.

An interest in the possible military application of what at the time were known as submarine boats prompted him to form the Garrett Submarine Navigation and Pneumatophore Company Limited and raise £10,000 through it from Manchester businessmen. (A pneumatophore was a device for removing carbon dioxide from the air).

In 1878, he built a 14-foot (4.3 m) long hand-cranked submarine of about 4.5 tons, which he named the Resurgam. This was followed by the second (and more famous) Resurgam of 1879. It was 45 feet (14 m) long, displaced about 30 tons on the surface and 38 tons submerged and was powered by steam - the furnace and chimney being shut off before diving. The Resurgam was built by Cochran and Co in Birkenhead, Merseyside,

It was not very practical - the boiler full of superheated water made conditions inside the submarine very hot indeed, and in common with many early submarine inventors he had not overcome the problems of longitudinal stability.

Nevertheless, although the submarine was lost whilst under tow in 1880 near Rhyl on its way to trials in Portsmouth for the Royal Navy, it impressed the Swedish industrialist Thorsten Nordenfelt sufficiently to finance him.

Together, they built a submarine for Greece and two for Turkey - Garrett was commissioned as a Commander in the Imperial Ottoman Navy for carrying out trials in these submarines. All of them suffered from severe stability problems. A further submarine was built for Russia but ran aground off Jutland on the way there and the Russians refused to pay for it.

== Final years ==
After this, Nordenfelt and Garrett parted company. Garrett emigrated to the United States, where he lost his savings in a failed farm in Florida. He then joined the United States Army Corps of Engineers and was promoted to corporal. He became a U.S. citizen and died in New York City in 1902 aged 49.
